= 2014 in Malaysia =

- Decades: 1990s; 2000s; 2010s; 2020s
- See also: Other events of 2014; History of Malaysia • Timeline • Years

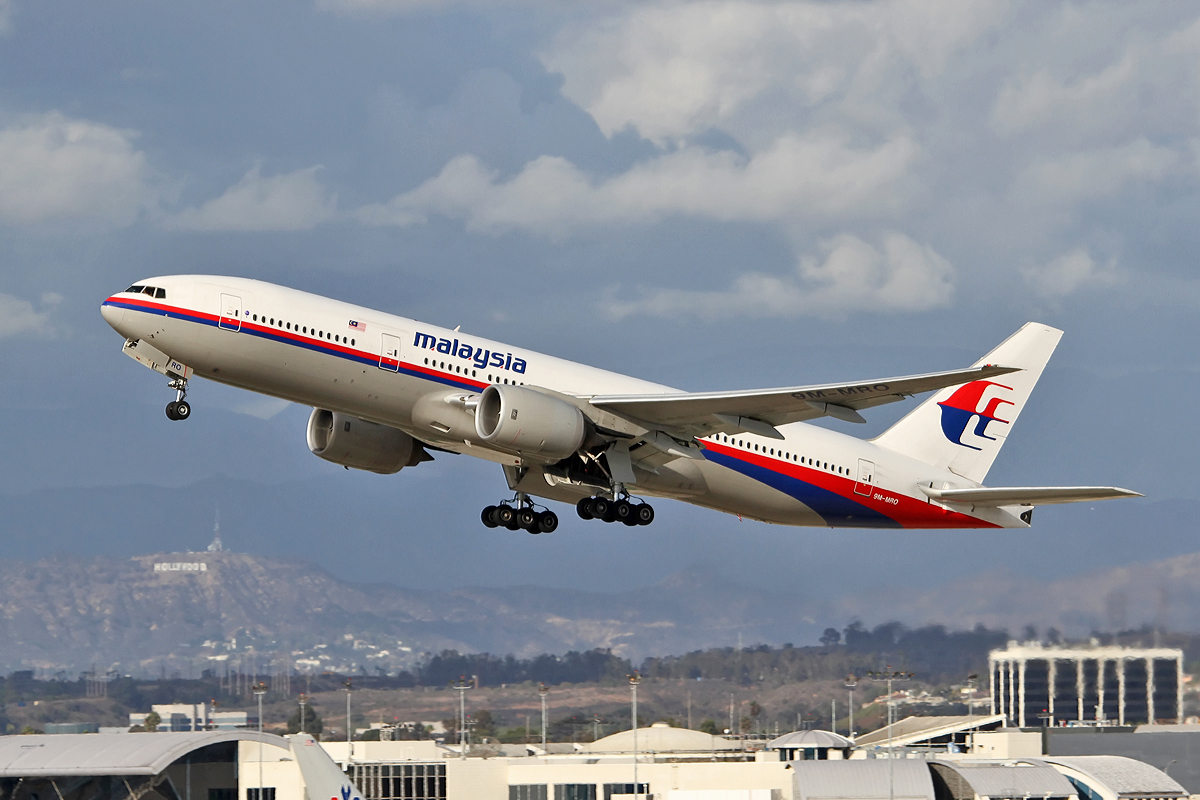
The Boeing 777-2H6ER of the Malaysia Airlines Flight MH370 which was reported missing on 8 March and assumed to have crashed somewhere in the Indian Ocean on 24 March.

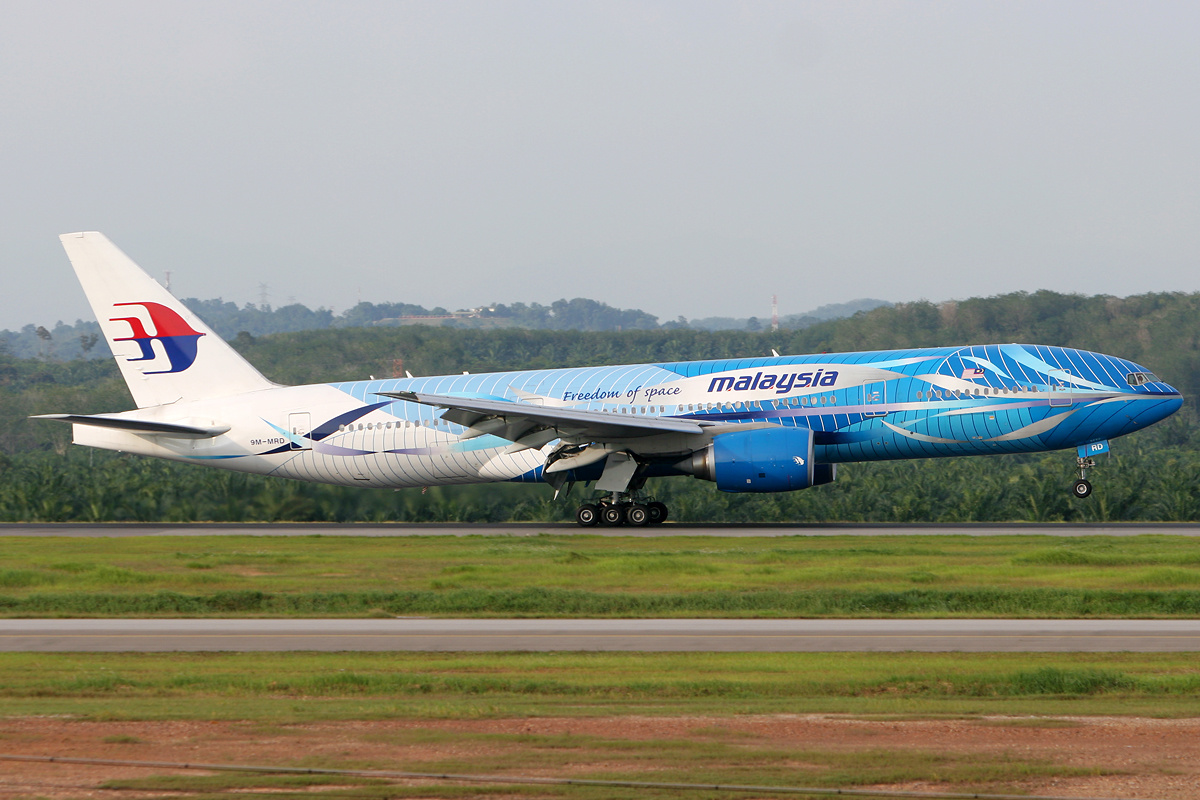
The Boeing 777-2H6ER of the Malaysia Airlines Flight MH17 was shot down and crashed in eastern Ukraine near Russia border on 17 July with no survivors.

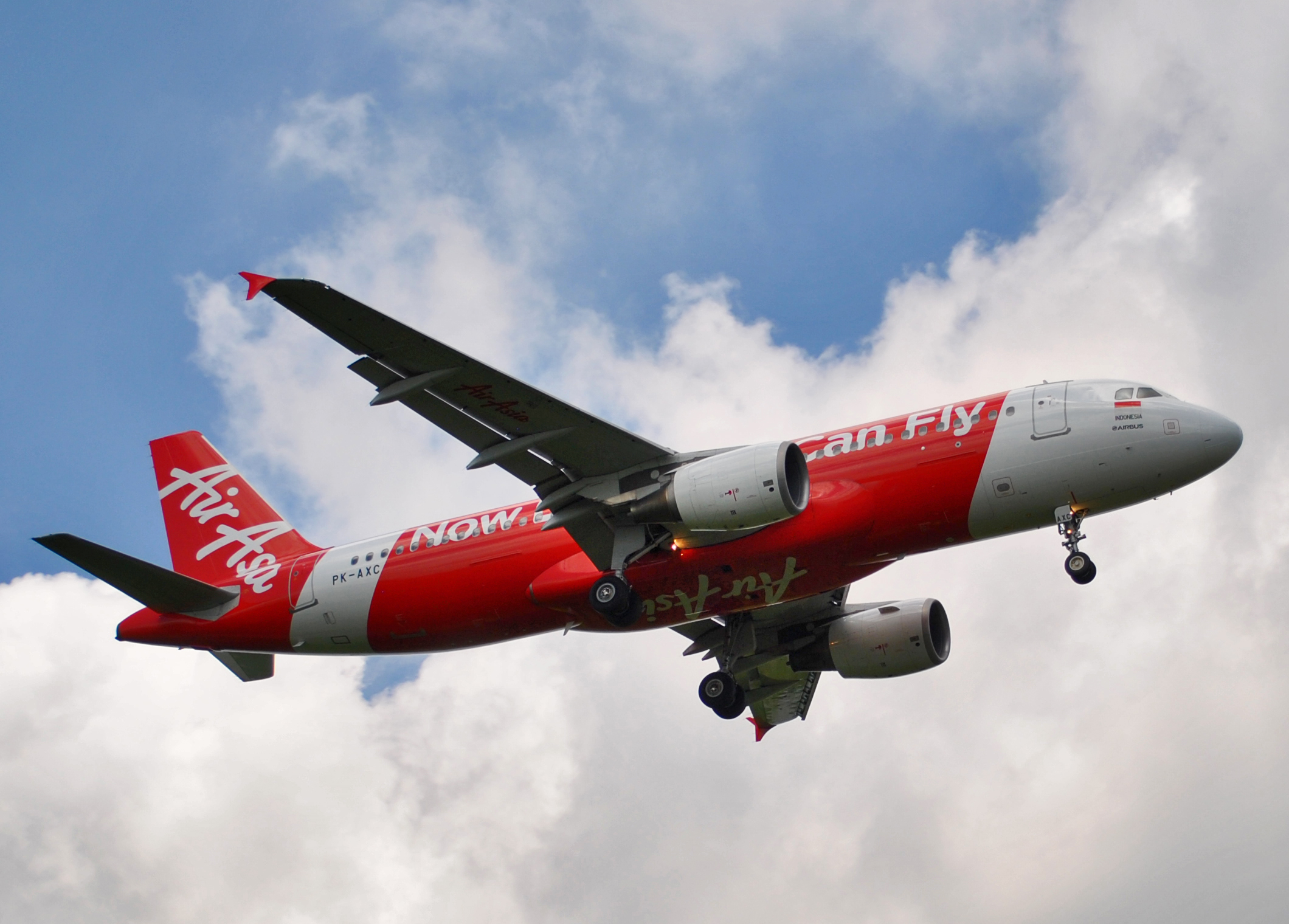
The Airbus A320-216 of the Indonesia AirAsia Flight QZ8501 en route from Surabaya, Indonesia, to Singapore with 162 passengers and crew on board was reported missing from radar on 28 December and found crashed in Karimata Strait near Kalimantan, Indonesia, on 30 December.

The following lists events from

2014 in Malaysia is 57th anniversary of Malaysia's independence.

== Incumbents ==
=== Federal level ===
- Yang di-Pertuan Agong: Sultan Abdul Halim Mu'adzam Shah of Kedah
- Raja Permaisuri Agong: Sultanah Haminah Hamidun of Kedah
- Deputy Yang di-Pertuan Agong: Sultan Muhammad V of Kelantan
- Prime Minister: Mohammad Najib Abdul Razak
- Deputy Prime Minister: Muhyiddin Yassin
- President of the Dewan Negara: Abu Zahar Ujang
- Speaker of the Dewan Rakyat: Pandikar Amin Mulia
- Chief Justice: Arifin Zakaria

=== State level ===
- Johor:
  - Sultan of Johor: Sultan Ibrahim
  - Menteri Besar of Johor: Mohamed Khaled Nordin
- Kedah:
  - Sultan of Kedah: (Council of Regency of Kedah)
    - Tunku Annuar (chairman) (until 21 May)
    - Tunku Sallehuddin (Members I) (until 3 June) / (chairman) (from 4 June)
    - Tunku Abdul Hamid Thani (Members II)
    - Tunku Puteri Intan Safinaz (Members III)
  - Menteri Besar of Kedah: Mukhriz Mahathir
- Kelantan:
  - Sultan of Kelantan: Sultan Muhammad V
  - Menteri Besar of Kelantan: Ahmad Yaakob
- Perlis:
  - Raja of Perlis: Tuanku Syed Sirajuddin
  - Menteri Besar of Perlis: Azlan Man
- Perak:
  - Sultan of Perak:
    - Sultan Azlan Muhibuddin Shah (until 28 May)
    - Sultan Nazrin Muizzuddin Shah (from 29 May)
  - Menteri Besar of Perak: Zambry Abdul Kadir
- Pahang:
  - Sultan of Pahang: Sultan Haji Ahmad Shah Al-Musta'in Billah
  - Menteri Besar of Pahang: Adnan Yaakob
- Selangor:
  - Sultan of Selangor: Sultan Sharafuddin Idris Shah
  - Menteri Besar of Selangor:
    - Abdul Khalid Ibrahim (until 23 September)
    - Mohamed Azmin Ali (from 23 September)
- Terengganu:
  - Sultan of Terengganu: Sultan Mizan Zainal Abidin
  - Menteri Besar of Terengganu:
    - Ahmad Said (until 12 May)
    - Ahmad Razif Abdul Rahman (from 13 May)
- Negeri Sembilan:
  - Yang di-Pertuan Besar of Negeri Sembilan: Tuanku Muhriz
  - Menteri Besar of Negeri Sembilan: Mohamad Hasan
- Penang:
  - Governor of Penang: Tun Abdul Rahman Abbas
  - Chief Minister of Penang: Lim Guan Eng
- Malacca:
  - Governor of Malacca: Tun Mohd Khalil Yaakob
  - Chief Minister of Malacca: Idris Haron
- Sarawak:
  - Governor of Sarawak:
    - Tun Abang Muhammad Salahuddin (until 28 February)
    - Tun Abdul Taib Mahmud (from 1 March)
  - Chief Minister of Sarawak:
    - Abdul Taib Mahmud (until 28 February)
    - Adenan Satem (from 1 March)
- Sabah:
  - Governor of Sabah: Tun Juhar Mahiruddin
  - Chief Minister of Sabah: Musa Aman

== Events ==
=== January ===
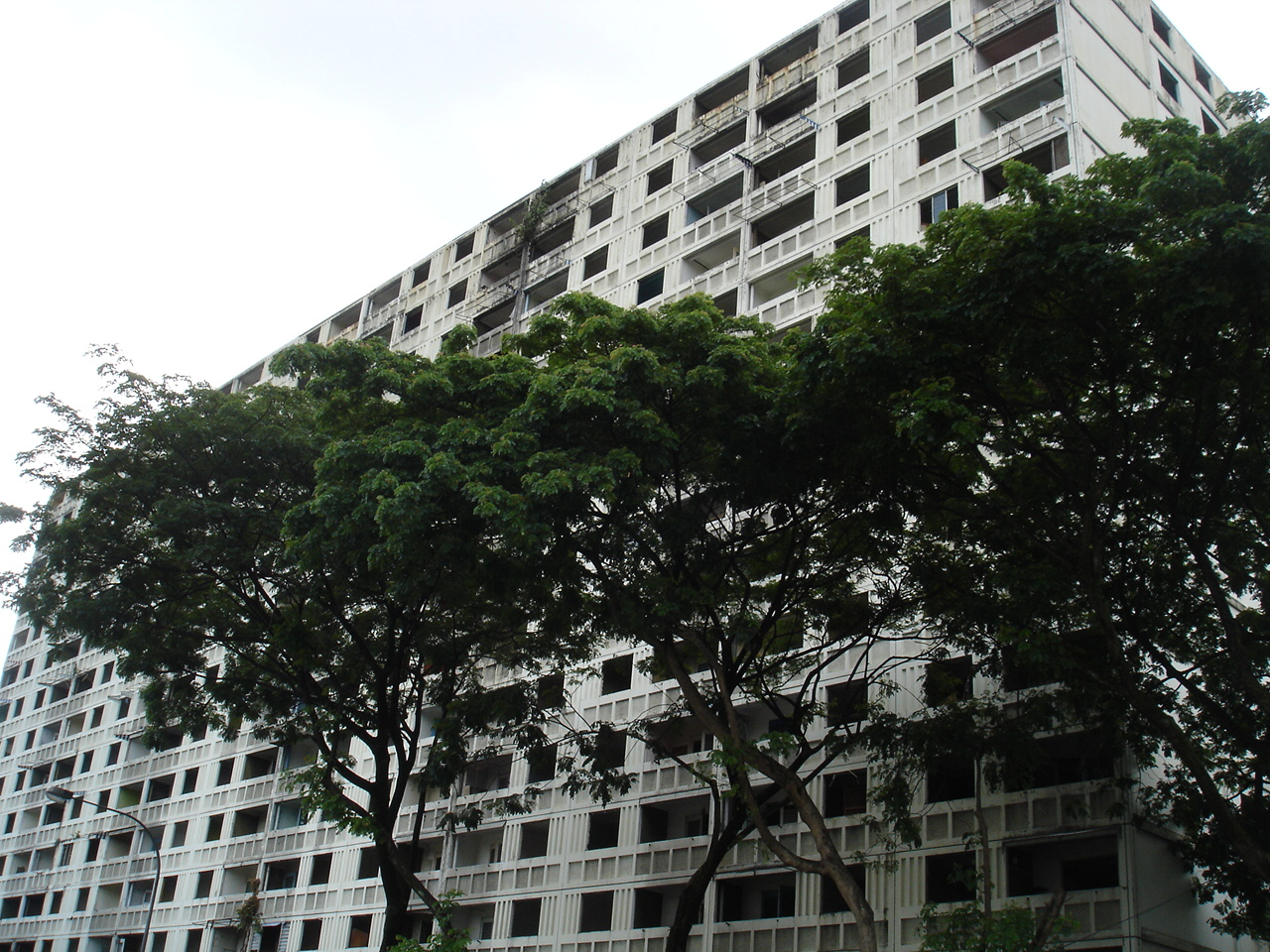
Pekeliling Flats

- 1 January
  - The Visit Malaysia 2014 campaign has officially begin.
  - Johor shifts its weekend holidays from Saturday and Sunday to Friday and Saturday.
- 7 January – A landslide in Lebuhraya Mahameru (part of Kuala Lumpur Middle Ring Road 1) near Wisma Tani, Kuala Lumpur caused a massive traffic congestion in many parts of the city centre.
- 9 January – The world's first Variable Density Tunnel Boring Machines make its breakthrough at the under construction Pasar Rakyat MRT station.
- 11 January – The missing Royal Selangor Flying Club's Cessna with three people on board crashed near the Batu Dam in Gombak, Selangor. All survived.
- 14 January – An individual who claims to be the Sultan of Malacca, Raja Noor Jan Shah Raja Tuah was arrested by police and he was being investigated under the Sedition Act.
- 14–20 January — Malaysia at the 2014 ASEAN Para Games in Naypyidaw, Myanmar.
- 15 January – The remains of Perak Man, the country's oldest prehistoric man uncovered 24 years ago, was officially opened for public viewing at the Lenggong Archaeological Gallery, Lenggong, Perak.
- 16 January – Southeast Asia's first ever-Chocolate museum, Chocolate Museum@Kota Damansara in Kota Damansara, Selangor officially opens.
- 17 January
  - A power blackout occurred at all parts of Sabah and Federal Territory of Labuan.
  - Economist, Dr Gnanathurai Nagarajah was killed in a suicide attack at a restaurant in Kabul, Afghanistan.
- 18 January
  - Three people drowned while eight others are reported missing after a boat ferrying wedding guests capsized in Batang Lassa river near Kampung Kut, Daro, Sarawak.
  - Two Malaysian couple, Azizul Raheem Awalludin, a Tourism Malaysia director in Stockholm and Shalwati Nurshal were detained in Sweden for allegedly hitting one of their four children at their house in Stockholm.
- 19 January
  - World number one badminton player Lee Chong Wei wins the 10th Malaysia Super Series Premier.
  - Three people killed and 15 others injured in a bus crash at kilometre-107 of the North–South Expressway near Yong Peng, Johor.
- 20 January – The revised National Automotive Policy (NAP) 2014 is unveiled.
- 22 January – The remaining blocks of the Pekeliling Flats (Blocks C – G) are finally demolished.
- 23–26 January – Cold weather phenomenon affects at most parts of Peninsular Malaysia. On 23 January, temperatures at Kuala Krai, Kelantan, is 17 °C and Gong Kedak, Besut, Terengganu is 19 °C. Next day on 25 January, temperatures at Mount Kinabalu, Sabah is −3 °C.
- 26 January – The Church of the Assumption in Farquhar Street, George Town, Penang has been attacked by the Molotov cocktail on Sunday early morning after a controversial banner with the word "Allah" found outside the church.
- 27 January – Kajang, Selangor's State Assemblyman, Lee Chin Cheh has resigned from the Selangor State Legislative Assembly.
- 28 January – Opposition leader and also Pakatan Rakyat de facto leader, Anwar Ibrahim will contests the Kajang by-elections as the Parti Keadilan Rakyat (PKR) candidates, next month.
- 31 January – All four children of the Malaysian couple who were detained by Swedish authorities over child abuse allegations arrived in Kuala Lumpur from Stockholm.

=== February ===
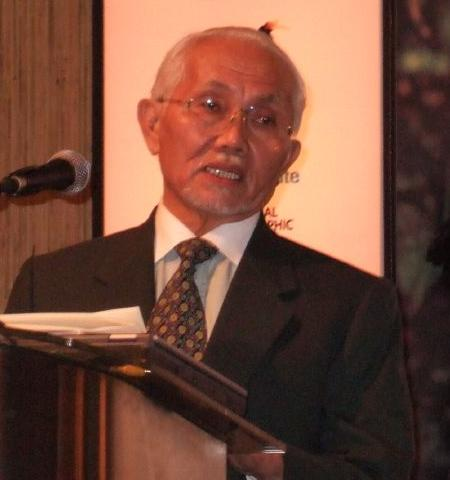
Pehin Sri Abdul Taib Mahmud, Sarawak's longest serving chief minister in almost 33 years. On 1 March, he was elected as the Governor of Sarawak.

- 1 February
  - The Federal Territory celebrates its 40th anniversary of foundation.
  - Sheila Majid as Malaysian female pop singer was officially brand ambassador for Strepsils from 1 February 2014 to present available in Malaysia, Singapore, Brunei and Timor Leste.
- 3 February
  - Police confirmed that the fire that destroyed ten exhibits at The Red Carpet Wax Museum at I-City, Shah Alam last Wednesday (29 January) was an act of sabotage.
  - Water pollution affects Batu Feringghi beach, Penang causes by e-coli bacteria.
- 3–16 February – 2014 Sukipt Games in Universiti Teknologi Mara.
- 7 February – The new Melaka Gateway mega development project on Malacca Island in Malacca City, is officially launched by the Prime Minister Mohammad Najib Abdul Razak.
- 8 February – Sarawak's longest serving chief minister, Pehin Sri Abdul Taib Mahmud announced that he would step down as Chief Minister of Sarawak after serving the state government in almost 33 years.
- February – Dry and hot weather phenomenon affects at most parts of Peninsular Malaysia.
- 10 February
  - Two Malaysian couple, Azizul Raheem Awalludin, a Tourism Malaysia director in Stockholm and Shalwati Nurshal were finally charged in a Stockholm court, Sweden for allegedly hitting one of their four children at their house in Stockholm.
  - A 22-year-old female German tourist killed in a fall close to the summit of Mount Kinabalu, Sabah.
- 11 February – A fire occurred at Padang Siding landfill in Perlis.
- 13 February – More than 40 students of SMK Syed Hassan in Kangar, Perlis, are down with food poisoning after having their breakfast at the school's hostel.
- 13–15 February – Several parts of the West Coast of Sabah were hit by flash floods.
- 15 February – A new building at the Sarawak General Hospital in Kuching, Sarawak, caught on fire at 5:00 pm killing one person.
- 17 February – The Institute of Diplomacy and Foreign Relations (IDFR) hosted the Official Launching of Mahathir Global Peace School with the theme “Global Peace and Conflict Resolution.” The programme was organised by Universitas Muhammadiyah Yokyakarta and the Perdana Global Peace Foundation (PGPF).
- 18 February
  - Popular actress Erra Fazira and husband, Engku Emran Engku Zainal Abidin is now legally divorced.
  - The first known Malaysian dinosaur fossil, a 75 million-year-old Spinosaurid tooth is discovered in Pahang.
- 19 February – 2014 Negeri Sembilan and Selangor water crisis
  - A water crisis hits Negeri Sembilan and Selangor as water levels in seven dams in the state have breached critical level.
- 21 February
  - MCA vice-president, Chew Mei Fun will contests the Kajang by-elections as the Barisan Nasional candidates, next month.
  - Eight teenage boys were missing in the drowning tragedy at Muar River in Buloh Kasap, Johor. On 22 February, the bodies of all five teenagers who were reported missing in Muar River near Buloh Kasap, were found.
- 25 February – 2014 Negeri Sembilan and Selangor water crisis
  - Water rationing in Selangor has now begun following water crisis in the state.
- 26 February – The federal and Selangor state governments signed a Memorandum of Understanding (MoU) on the restructuring of the state's water supply industry which has dragged on for five years. Under the MoU, the Selangor state government will issue a development order for the construction of the Langat 2 Water Treatment Plant (Langat 2) and its distribution system (LRAL2) (Package 2A) effective today and ensure that all approvals and authorisations relating to the LRAL2 project approved within 30 days. The construction of the Langat 2 dam will begin on the middle this year.
- 27 February – SITI: An Iconic Exhibition of Dato' Siti Nurhaliza, a month-long fundraising exhibition of paintings and artworks that were inspired by the achievements made by Malaysian recording artist, Siti Nurhaliza is held in Artelier Gallery, Publika, Kuala Lumpur.
- 28 February – Tan Sri Adenan Satem became 5th Chief Minister of Sarawak replacing Pehin Sri Abdul Taib Mahmud.

=== March ===
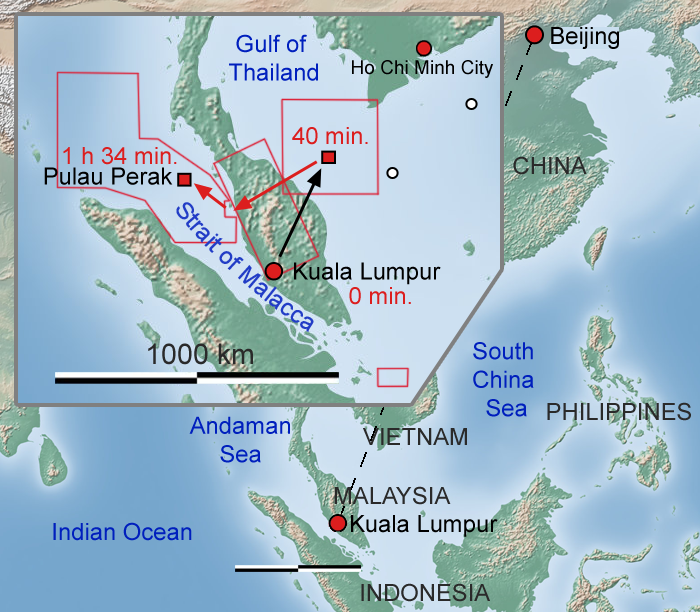
Route with start from Kuala Lumpur and destination Beijing. Inserted search areas and known path. Red filled squares: radar contacts. Small circles: claimed spotting of debris.

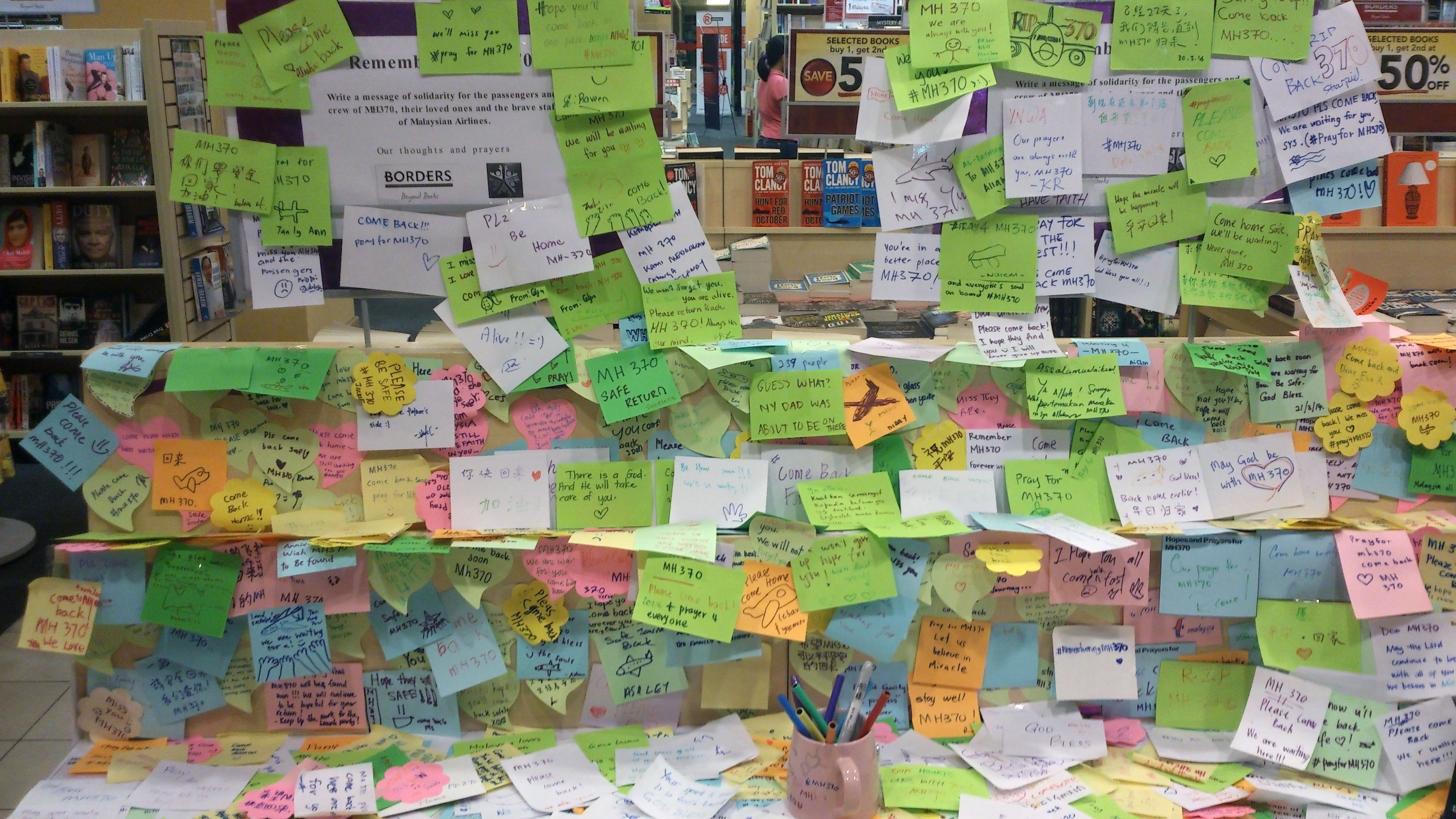
Messages of hope and prayer for MH370 at a bookstore in Malaysia.

- 1 March
  - Tun Abdul Taib Mahmud became 7th Governor of Sarawak replacing Tun Abang Muhammad Salahuddin.
  - Official opening ceremony of the Penang Second Bridge. The bridge is officially named as the Sultan Abdul Halim Muadzam Shah Bridge.
- 2 March — At 12:01 am, the Sultan Abdul Halim Muadzam Shah Bridge is officially opened to motorists after the opening ceremony.
- March – Haze affected at most parts of Peninsular Malaysia causes by dry and hot weather phenomenon.
- 5 March
  - Tan Sri Bernard Dompok steps down as UPKO president.
  - The "Allah" word appeal hearing brought by Catholic weekly The Herald at the Court of Appeal has brought about 1,000 supporters of various Muslim non-governmental organisations staging peaceful demonstrations in front of the Palace of Justice in Putrajaya, Malaysia.
- 7 March
  - Opposition leader, Anwar Ibrahim was sentenced to five years' jail by the Court of Appeal for sodomising his aide, Mohd Saiful Bukhari Azlan in 2008.
  - The Ultraman: The Ultra Power comic book has been banned in the country because it uses the word "Allah" to describe the Japanese action hero.
- 8 March – The Boeing 777-2H6ER of the Malaysia Airlines Flight MH370 which carrying 227 passengers, including 2 infants, and 12 crew members onboard from Kuala Lumpur to Beijing has reported missing from Subang Air Traffic Control Centre radar.
  - At 12:00 pm, the Boeing 777-2H6ER of the Malaysia Airlines Flight MH370 was found missing at the South China Sea near Vietnam.
  - Vietnamese Air Force planes spotted two large oil slicks in the area where a Malaysia Airlines Flight MH370 Boeing 777-2H6ER vanished earlier in the day, the first sign that the aircraft carrying 239 people on board had crashed.
- 9 March – Malaysia Airlines Flight MH370 missing (Day 2):
  - Malaysia sent their assets from the Royal Malaysian Air Force, Royal Malaysian Navy and the Malaysian Maritime Enforcement Agency (MMEA) to the missing plane crash site at South China Sea. Other countries including Australia, Brunei, China, India, Indonesia, Japan, New Zealand, the Philippines, Singapore, Taiwan, Thailand, Vietnam and the United States took part in the emergency, search and rescue mission. United States sent US Navy's P-3C Orion maritime patrol aircraft and three naval ships, USS Pinckney and USNS John Ericsson to the missing plane crash site.
  - One Italian and one Austrian were not on board of the Malaysia Airlines Flight MH370 because their country's passport were stolen. INTERPOL confirms that at least two stolen passports used by passengers on missing Malaysia Airlines Flight MH370 were registered in its databases.
  - Muslims in Malaysia performs solat hajat or special prayers for MH370 at all mosques and suraus nationwide while other religions performs special religious prayers for MH370.
- 9 March – World's no.1 badminton player, Lee Chong Wei wins All England titles for the third time beating China's Chen Long in the finals at Birmingham, England.
- 10 March – Malaysia Airlines Flight MH370 missing (Day 3):
  - Some 227 families and friends of MH370 passengers from Beijing arrived at Kuala Lumpur International Airport (KLIA) at around 9:00 am.
  - Shares in Malaysia Airlines lose up to 18 percent on the first trading day of the Bursa Malaysia since the plane went missing, before closing down four percent.
  - Samples from the oil spill suspected to be from the missing Malaysia Airlines Flight MH370 Boeing 777-2H6ER on route to Beijing and found in the South China Sea, about 100 nm (185.2 km) from the Tok Bali Beach, Kelantan, has been sent to the Chemistry Department in Petaling Jaya, Selangor for analyze. The final analyze that the oil spill was not belonged to Malaysia Airlines Flight MH370 Boeing 777-2H6ER.
  - Search and rescue operations has been widened at most parts of northern Peninsular Malaysia including Strait of Malacca.
  - The US Navy sends a second destroyer USS Kidd (DDG-100) to join the operation.
  - Yang di-Pertuan Agong Sultan Abdul Halim Mu'adzam Shah of Kedah expressed sympathy for the passengers and crew of Malaysia Airlines flight MH370, which went missing over the South China Sea on 8 March on Saturday and called on family members of those affected to remain calm and strong.
- 10 March – Anwar Ibrahim's wife Wan Azizah Wan Ismail will replace him as the Pakatan Rakyat candidate for 2014 Kajang by-election.
- 11 March – Malaysia Airlines Flight MH370 missing (Day 4):
  - INTERPOL has released an image of two Iranians who were traveling with stolen passports on a missing Malaysia Airlines Flight MH370. Poria Nour Mohammad Mehrdad, 19 and Delavar Seyed Mohammad Redza, 30, had used stolen passports to board the missing MH370 flight, but INTERPOL says the two were "probably not terrorists".
  - It was reported that Malaysia Airlines Flight MH370, missing since 8 March while en route from Kuala Lumpur to Beijing, was last picked up on radar at 2:40 am near Perak Island, Kedah at Strait of Malacca, hundreds of miles away from its original course. This last location is approximately 500 km (310 mi) from its last position in contact with air traffic control. However, the Royal Malaysian Air Force chief, Rodzali Daud denied making the statements as reported in the media, requesting that the misreporting be "amended and corrected to prevent further misinterpretations of what is clearly an inaccurate and incorrect report".
- 12 March – Malaysia Airlines Flight MH370 missing (Day 5):
  - Prime Minister Mohammad Najib Abdul Razak said all-out efforts were being made to search for the Malaysia Airlines MH370 flight that went missing since 8 March on Saturday, adding that everyone should pray for their success.
  - Authorities began to search the Andaman Sea, northwest of the Strait of Malacca, and the Malaysian government requested help from India to search in the area.
  - China released satellite images captured three days earlier that show three floating objects at 6.7°N 105.63°E measuring 13 by 18 metres (43 ft × 59 ft), 14 by 19 metres (46 ft × 62 ft) and 24 by 22 metres (79 ft × 72 ft). However, searching aircraft could not find debris.
- 13 March – Malaysia Airlines Flight MH370 missing (Day 6):
  - The Malaysian Maritime Enforcement Agency (MMEA) deployed a multi-purpose Bombardier 415 aircraft into the South China Sea to investigate the site where Chinese satellites photographed three 'large floating objects', near an area where flight MH370 is suspected to have disappeared.
- 14 March – Malaysia Airlines Flight MH370 missing (Day 7):
  - United States officials have an "indication" the missing Malaysia Airlines flight MH370 may have crashed in the Indian Ocean and is moving the USS Kidd to the area to begin searching.
  - Search and rescue for missing MH370 extended towards Indian Ocean.
  - During friday prayers, all mosques nationwide performs special Friday sermon (Khutbah) for MH370 and solat hajat or special prayers for MH370.
  - British based global satellite company, Inmarsat revealed that it had registered "routine, automated signals" from missing Malaysia Airlines flight MH370 during its flight from Kuala Lumpur.
- 14 March – All the 131 schools in the Klang District closed due to the haze.
- 15 March – Malaysia Airlines Flight MH370 missing (Day 8):
  - Malaysian Prime Minister Mohammad Najib Abdul Razak also confirms that MH370's addressing and reporting, as well as its transponder "was switched off" before making the turn back towards the Strait of Malacca. Other statements confirmed that:
    - The Aircraft Communications Addressing and Reporting System (ACARS) was disabled just before the aircraft reached the East Coast of Peninsular Malaysia.
    - Later, the aircraft's transponder was switched off near the border between Malaysian and Vietnamese air traffic control.
    - The aircraft shown in Royal Malaysian Air Force (RMAF) primary radar previously is confirmed as flight MH370. This is based on raw satellite data that was obtained from the satellite data service provider.
    - MH370 did indeed turn back. It then flew in a westerly direction back over peninsular Malaysia before turning northwest.
    - The last confirmed communication between the plane and the satellite was at 8:11 am MST on Saturday, 8 March.
    - Up until the point at which it left military primary radar coverage, these movements are consistent with "deliberate action" by someone on the plane.
    - The investigations team is making further calculations which will indicate how far the aircraft may have flown after this last point of contact to refine the search.
    - The plane's last communication with the satellite was in one of two possible corridors: a northern corridor stretching approximately from the border of Kazakhstan and Turkmenistan to northern Thailand, or a southern corridor stretching approximately from Indonesia to the southern Indian Ocean.
    - Authorities have refocused investigation into the crew and passengers on board.
    - Despite media reports that the plane was hijacked, authorities would still investigate all possibilities as to what caused MH370 to deviate from its original flight path.
  - Malaysia and other countries ends search and rescue operations in the South China Sea and reassessing the redeployment of assets.
  - Police searched the home of pilot Captain Zaharie Ahmad Shah and the co-pilot Fariq Abdul Hamid of the missing Malaysia Airlines flight MH370 in Shah Alam, Selangor.
- 15 March – The last day of the Future Music Festival Asia, held at National Stadium, Bukit Jalil, was suddenly cancelled after five people died from drug overdose.
- 16 March – Malaysia Airlines Flight MH370 missing (Day 9):
  - Police take flight simulator from home of missing Malaysia Airlines jet's pilot, Captain Zaharie Ahmad Shah in Shah Alam, Selangor and re-assemble it to study its data.
  - Police have classified the case of the missing Malaysia Airlines flight MH370 as an act of terrorism, which also included hijacking and sabotage. Inspector-General of Police, Tan Sri Khalid Abu Bakar says that all procedures under the Security Offences (Special Measures) Act 2012 applied here and would also provide investigation under the Aviation Offences Act.
- 17 March – Malaysia Airlines Flight MH370 missing (Day 10):
  - The Royal Malaysian Navy (RMN) and the Royal Malaysian Air Force (RMAF) are to search for a missing Malaysia Airlines flight MH370 by deploying their assets in the so-called southern corridor. The southern corridor stretches from Indonesia to the southern Indian Ocean, as opposed to the northern corridor which stretches from the border of Kazakhstan and Turkmenistan to Northern Thailand.
- 17 March – An express bus fell into a nine-metre-deep ravine after veering off the North–South Expressway near Gua Tempurung in Gopeng. A driver was killed and three others were injured.
- 18 March – Malaysia Airlines Flight MH370 missing (Day 11):
  - Australia will assume responsibility in coordinating the part of the Malaysia Airlines flight MH370 search-and-rescue efforts now focused on the southern Indian Ocean.
  - Three million people have joined an effort led by a satellite operator, DigitalGlobe to locate the missing Malaysia Airlines flight MH370 plane, in what may be the largest crowdsourcing project of its kind.
- 19 March – Malaysia Airlines Flight MH370 missing (Day 12):
  - Malaysia asked the US Federal Bureau of Investigation (FBI) to help recover data deleted from a flight simulator in the home of the pilot, Captain Zaharie Ahmad Shah of a missing Malaysia Airlines Flight MH370.
  - Acting Transport Minister, Hishammuddin Hussein told a news conference that the pilot, Captain Zaharie Ahmad Shah, is considered innocent until proven guilty of any wrongdoing, and that members of his family are cooperating in the investigation.
- 20 March – Malaysia Airlines Flight MH370 missing (Day 13):
  - Australian Prime Minister, Tony Abbott announces possible findings related to search mission for the Malaysia Airlines Flight 370 in Indian Ocean.
  - Australian Maritime Safety Authority (AMSA) said that the largest object sighted in the search for missing Malaysia Airlines Flight MH370 is 24 metres, with a second, smaller object also spotted located at Indian Ocean, about 2,500 kilometres south-west of Perth, Western Australia.
  - A task force of aircraft and ships has been sent to the southern Indian Ocean to determine if objects spotted by satellite are debris from the missing Malaysia Airlines Flight MH370 jet.
  - A Norwegian ship, Höegh Saint Petersburg reached an area of the Indian Ocean where possible debris of the missing Malaysia Airlines Flight MH370 plane was spotted.
- 21 March – Malaysia Airlines Flight MH370 missing (Day 14):
  - Air search and rescue expends to southern Indian Ocean.
- 21 March – More than 500,000 people gathered in Putrajaya for the Malam Cinta Rasul, the biggest Islamic event.
- 22 March – Malaysia Airlines Flight MH370 missing (Day 15):
  - Search focuses on an area 3,000 kilometres (1,900 miles) southwest of Perth, Western Australia.
- 23 March – Malaysia Airlines Flight MH370 missing (Day 16):
  - Chinese satellite image shows a possible object measuring 22.5 by 13 metres (74 by 43 ft) at 44°57′30″S 90°13′40″E, approximately 3,170 kilometres (1,970 miles) west of Perth and just 120 kilometres (75 miles) from the earlier sighting.
- 23 March – 2014 Kajang by-elections:
  - Parti Keadilan Rakyat (PKR) candidate Wan Azizah Wan Ismail win this by-elections beating Barisan Nasional (BN) candidate Chew Mei Fun with reduced majority of 5,379 votes.
- 24 March – Malaysia Airlines Flight MH370 missing (Day 17):
  - Two Ilyushin IL-76 aircraft from China and two P3 Orion aircraft from Japan joined the search and rescue (SAR) operation for the missing Malaysia Airlines MH370 in the southern corridor.
  - The 2014 Petronas Malaysian Grand Prix which to be held on 28 until 30 March must go on.
  - At 10:00 pm, both Malaysia Airlines and Malaysian Prime Minister Mohammad Najib Abdul Razak announces that Malaysia Airlines flight MH370, which went missing on 8 March, crashed and ended in the southern Indian Ocean with no survivors.
- 24 March
  - A Malaysia Airlines flight MH0066 from Kuala Lumpur to Incheon, South Korea, was diverted to Hong Kong International Airport at Chek Lap Kok due to an inoperative aircraft generator.
  - One person was killed and others injured in a school bus crash at Jalan Ampang–Hulu Langat near Ampang Look Out Point.
  - A mother and her two toddlers died on the spot when the multipurpose vehicle (MPV) they were travelling in rammed into the right rear side of a lorry on the North–South Expressway near Nibong Tebal, Penang.
- 25 March – Malaysia Airlines Flight MH370 crash into Indian Ocean (Day 18):
  - Malaysia mourns Malaysia Airlines MH370 tragedy.
  - Many newspapers nationwide turn black in memory of the 239 victims of the Malaysia Airlines MH370 tragedy.
  - The flag of Johor and the flag of Perak will be flown at half-mast over the Malaysia Airlines MH370 tragedy.
  - The search for wreckage of crashed Malaysia Airlines MH370 postponed due to bad weather in the Indian Ocean.
- 26 March – Malaysia Airlines Flight MH370 crash into Indian Ocean (Day 19):
  - The search for wreckage of crashed Malaysia Airlines MH370 resumed after the weather improved, with Chinese ships and Korean planes joining the hunt over a vast stretch of the Indian Ocean.
  - The flag of Pahang will be flown at half-mast over the Malaysia Airlines MH370 tragedy.
  - Acting Transport Minister, Hishammuddin Hussein said that the satellite detected 122 potential objects of the Malaysia Airlines MH370 about 2,557 km from Perth, Western Australia.
- 26 March – A Malindo Air flight bound for Kuala Terengganu return to the Sultan Abdul Aziz Shah Airport after one of its engines of the ATR 72-600 caught fire.
- 27 March – Malaysia Airlines Flight MH370 crash into Indian Ocean (Day 20):
  - Aircraft searches for the Malaysia Airlines Flight MH370 jetliner presumed crashed in the southern Indian Ocean have been called off due to bad weather.
  - The Kuching City North Commission (DBKU) has cancelled all activities and events of an entertainment nature in conjunction with Earth Hour 2014 on Saturday, 29 March as a mark of respect for the passengers and crew of the lost Malaysia Airlines flight MH370.
  - Thai satellite images have shown some 300 objects floating in the southern Indian Ocean.
  - A tahlil prayer to facilitate the search for the missing Malaysia Airlines Flight MH370 and those on board was held after the Maghrib prayer at the National Mosque, Kuala Lumpur.
- 27 March – Malaysian Prime Minister Mohammad Najib Abdul Razak arrived in Manila, Philippines, for a working visit to witness the signing of the historic Comprehensive Agreement on Bangsamoro which ends decades of hostilities between the Philippine government and the Moro Islamic Liberation Front (MILF).
- 28 March – Malaysia Airlines Flight MH370 crash into Indian Ocean (Day 21):
  - Japanese satellite images have shown around 10 floating objects off Australia, possibly from missing Malaysia Airlines Flight MH370. The objects were spotted in waters roughly 2,500 kilometres (1,600 miles) southwest of Perth.
  - Planes and ships resumed the hunt for wreckage from Malaysia Airlines Flight MH370 after the weather cleared as they chase down more satellite sightings of suspected debris nearly three weeks after the jet crashed.
  - The search area for the lost Malaysia Airlines Flight MH370 jetliner was moved 1,100 kilometres (680 miles) to the northeast, as Australian officials said a new analysis of radar data suggests the plane had flown faster and therefore ran out of fuel more quickly than had been previously estimated.
- 28 March – Tourism Malaysia officer in Sweden, Azizul Raheem Awalluddin and his wife Shalwati Norshal were found guilty of child abuse and sentenced to 10 and 14 months imprisonment by the Solna District Court in Stockholm.
- 29 March – Malaysia Airlines Flight MH370 crash into Indian Ocean (Day 22):
  - Search activities have now concluded. Approximately 252,000 square kilometres were searched.
  - The largest Chinese patrol ship, the Haixun 01, and the Australian replenishment oiler HMAS Success retrieve flotsam apparently unrelated to MH370 in the newest search area.
  - The Government of Malaysia and the Air Accidents Investigation Branch (AAIB) stated that, in accordance with the protocols detailed in International Civil Aviation Organization (ICAO) Annex 13 concerning aircraft accident investigation, an international team would investigate the loss of the flight.
- 29 March
  - Water rationing in Selangor, Federal Territory of Kuala Lumpur and Putrajaya has been extended to 30 April.
  - Democratic Action Party (DAP) chairman Karpal Singh has resigned as party chairman following his conviction under the Sedition Act. Tan Kok Wai has been appointed acting DAP chairman.
- 29 March – 2014 Balingian by-election:
  - Barisan Nasional candidate Yussibnosh Balo wins this by-election with a majority of 6,911 votes (72.92 per cent) beating Parti Keadilan Rakyat (PKR) candidate Abdul Jalil Bujang.
- 30 March – Malaysia Airlines Flight MH370 crash into Indian Ocean (Day 23):
  - Malaysian Prime Minister, Mohammad Najib Abdul Razak together with 22 racers of the Formula One Malaysia Petronas Grand Prix 2014 observed a minute's silence in remembrance of the passengers and crew of the Malaysia Airlines Flight MH370 at the Sepang International Circuit.
- 31 March – Malaysia Airlines Flight MH370 crash into Indian Ocean (Day 24):
  - Regent of Perak Raja Nazrin Shah represented the state legislative assembly in expressing appreciation to the Federal Government and authorities of the 26 nations which joined in the search and rescue (SAR) mission in search for the missing Malaysia Airlines Flight MH370.
  - The Joint Agency Coordination Centre (JACC) which based in Pearce Air force Base in Perth, Western Australia, has been setting up for locate, search and rescue mission for the missing Malaysia Airlines Flight MH370.

=== April ===
- 1 April – Malaysia Airlines Flight MH370 crash into Indian Ocean (Day 25):
  - A transcript of communicator between Malaysia Airlines Flight MH370 and air traffic controller (ATC) has been released.
    - "Good night Malaysian three seven zero", was the last conversation in the transcript between the ATC and the cockpit of the missing Malaysia Airlines Flight MH370 aircraft.
- 2 April – Malaysia Airlines Flight MH370 crash into Indian Ocean (Day 26):
  - The British Royal Navy survey ship HMS Echo and nuclear submarine HMS Tireless join search for missing Malaysia Airlines flight MH370.
  - The International Civil Aviation Organization (ICAO) and International Air Transport Association (IATA) have lauded Malaysia for its handling of the Malaysia Airlines flight MH370 incident.
  - Prime Minister Mohammad Najib Abdul Razak made his two-day working visit to Perth, Australia, to observe the multi-national operations into the search for missing Malaysia Airlines Flight MH370 from the Western Australian city.
- 2 April
  - The Amanah Saham Bumiputera 2 (ASB2) second scheme is launched by the Prime Minister Mohammad Najib Abdul Razak.
  - Seven men stormed a resort in Singamata Resort, Semporna, Sabah, before abducting two people, a tourist from China and a Filipino worker. The incident happened at around 10:30 pm after the group of men arrived at the resort by boat armed with M14 rifles.
- 3 April – Malaysia Airlines Flight MH370 crash into Indian Ocean (Day 27):
  - The Lord of the Rings film director Peter Jackson's private jet now involved in the hunt for Malaysia Airlines Flight MH370.
- 3 April – Prime Minister Mohammad Najib Abdul Razak made his two-day official visits to Vietnam.
- 4 April – Malaysia Airlines Flight MH370 crash into Indian Ocean (Day 28):
  - Australian naval vessel ADV Ocean Shield with a towed pinger locator from the United States begins underwater search for the "Black Boxes".
- 5 April – Malaysia Airlines Flight MH370 crash into Indian Ocean (Day 29):
  - Chinese patrol ship Haixun 01 detects a "pulse signal" at 37.5 kHz – the frequency used for black boxes – at 25°S 101°E. An Australian Defence Force spokesman describes it as "an anomaly of interest"[261], but Joint Agency Coordination Centre (JACC) is unable to verify that it is from MH370.
  - Malaysian government has established three new ministerial committees to streamline and strengthen the ongoing efforts made by the government in handling the Malaysia Airlines Flight MH370 case.
- 6 April – Malaysia Airlines Flight MH370 crash into Indian Ocean (Day 30):
  - Air Chief Marshal Angus Houston, head of coordination at the Joint Agency Coordination Centre (JACC), said the reported characteristics of the Haixun 01 signal "are consistent with the aircraft black box". JACC confirms that up to ten military aircraft, two civil aircraft and thirteen ships will assist in Sunday's search.
- 6 April
  - Singapore Prime Minister Lee Hsien Loong meets Malaysian counterpart Mohammad Najib Abdul Razak on his two-day working visit to Malaysia.
  - World's no.1 badminton player, Lee Chong Wei wins Indian Open title after beating China's Chen Long 21–13, 21–17 in the final.
- 7 April – Malaysia Airlines Flight MH370 crash into Indian Ocean (Day 31):
  - Sultan of Selangor, Sultan Sharafuddin Idris Shah expressed his grief over the loss of Malaysia Airlines MH370 which ended in the southern Indian Ocean.
  - Up to nine military planes, three civil planes and 14 ships will assist in search for missing Malaysia Airlines flight MH370.
  - Joint Agency Coordination Centre (JACC) press conference announces pinger locator towed by Ocean Shield had picked up signals on 6 April.
- 7 April – Malaysia and Singapore are planning to develop a "Friendship Bridge" to improve road connectivity between Mainland and Island that will strengthen and enhance the relationship between both countries.
- 8 April – Malaysia Airlines Flight MH370 crash into Indian Ocean (Day 32):
  - Malaysia Airlines (MAS) is currently drafting a D-day plan, which is subject to approval of the Malaysian and Chinese governments, to make arrangements for the families of passengers on board its vanished MH370, to fly to Perth once the aircraft is found.
- 8 April – A "Topless Beach Party" concert at The Pool, Jalan Ampang, Kuala Lumpur this Friday on 11 April has been cancelled following orders from Minister of the Federal Territories, Tengku Adnan Tengku Mansor.
- 9 April – Malaysia Airlines Flight MH370 crash into Indian Ocean (Day 33):
  - Japan's Maritime Self-Defence Force has deployed two P3 Orion aircraft to the Perth's Pearce Air Force Base from Subang.
  - The ADV Ocean Shield has detected two more signals for the Malaysia Airlines Flight 370.
- 10 April – Malaysia Airlines Flight MH370 crash into Indian Ocean (Day 34):
  - Governor of Sabah Tun Juhar Mahiruddin extended sympathy and prayers towards the families of the passengers and crews of MH370 at the opening of the second term of the 14th State Legislative Assembly in Kota Kinabalu.
- 10 April
  - Prime Minister Mohammad Najib Abdul Razak performed the ground breaking ceremony for the RM1.5 billion integrated aroma ingredients complex in Gebeng, Pahang. The project was not only reflect the strategic partnership between Petronas and BASF but also displayed the strong partnership between Malaysia and Germany, a country which Malaysia had always held with high regard.
  - The National Football Development Plan (NFDP) is unveiled and the Mokhtar Dahari National Football Academy (MDNFA) (Akademi Bola Sepak Negara Mokhtar Dahari (ABD)) in Gambang, Pahang is officially opened by the Prime Minister Mohammad Najib Abdul Razak.
- 11 April – Malaysia Airlines Flight MH370 crash into Indian Ocean (Day 35):
  - The Chief Coordinator of the Joint Agency Coordination Centre (JACC), Air Chief Marshal Angus Houston, said an initial assessment of the possible signal detected by a RAAF AP-3C Orion aircraft yesterday afternoon has been determined as not related to an aircraft underwater locator beacon.
  - Malaysia's government has begun investigating civil aviation and military authorities to determine why opportunities to identify and track Malaysia Airlines Flight MH370 were missed in the chaotic hours after it vanished.
- 11 April – A six-year-old girl, Elysha Natasha Shukri succumbed to her injuries after she was believed have been abused by her uncle in Simunjan, Sarawak.
- 12 April – Malaysia Airlines Flight MH370 crash into Indian Ocean (Day 36):
  - Police investigate the company involved in the cleaning of Malaysia Airlines flight MH370 cabin before it departed from Kuala Lumpur International Airport (KLIA) to Beijing Capital International Airport, Beijing, China on 8 March.
- 12 April – Three people were killed in a bus crash at KM11 of Bentong–Raub road near Bentong, Pahang.
- 13 April – Malaysia Airlines Flight MH370 crash into Indian Ocean (Day 37):
  - The MH370 tragedy has tested the mechanisms of bilateralism and regionalism, and they have not been found wanting, said Defence Minister Hishammuddin Hussein.
- 14 AprilMalaysia Airlines Flight MH370 crash into Indian Ocean (Day 38):
  - The Bluefin 21 autonomous submarine will be deployed for the searching for the Malaysia Airlines Flight MH370.
  - An oil slick is found 5.5 km from the estimated location of the pings by Ocean Shield.
- 14 April – A school van plunged into a septic pond in Taman Universiti, Skudai, Johor, killing one child and leaving five others in critical condition.
- 15 April – Malaysia Airlines Flight MH370 crash into Indian Ocean (Day 39):
  - The Catholic Church in Adelaide, South Australia, will conduct a special service next week for the passengers and crew on board missing Malaysia Airlines flight MH370.
- 16 April – Malaysia Airlines Flight MH370 crash into Indian Ocean (Day 40):
  - Royal Malaysian Navy (RMN) Auxiliary Ship KD Bunga Mas Enam (BM6) set sail to the Indian Ocean.
- 16 April
  - A 54-year-old man from Johor, who recently returned to Malaysia after performing the umrah in Mecca, died after contracting the Middle Eastern Respiratory Syndrome (MERS).
  - The Negeri Sembilan government is prepared to sell treated water for the use of consumers in the Klang Valley and in Selangor, who are currently facing a water crisis.
  - Prime Minister Mohammad Najib Abdul Razak makes its official two-day visit to Turkey for signing the Malaysia-Turkey Free Trade Agreement (FTA) with Turkish counterpart, Recep Tayyip Erdoğan.
- 17 April
  - Malaysia Airlines Flight MH370 crash into Indian Ocean (Day 41):
  - Former Democratic Action Party (DAP) chairman and also Gelugor Member of Parliament, Karpal Singh and his assistant Michael Cornandez were killed in a road accident at the North–South Expressway near Gua Tempurung, Kampar, Perak. On 20 April, Karpal was accorded a state level funeral in George Town, Penang and was cremated at the Batu Gantong Crematorium.
- 18 April – Malaysia Airlines Flight MH370 crash into Indian Ocean (Day 42):
  - The oil slick discovered four days earlier is determined by an Australian laboratory analysis to not be related to MH370.
- 19 April
  - Malaysia Airlines Flight MH370 crash into Indian Ocean (Day 43):
  - A bus driver and several passengers were injured when an express bus crashed into the guardrail before it landed on its side at the East Coast Expressway near Temerloh, Pahang.
- 20 April
  - Malaysia Airlines Flight MH370 crash into Indian Ocean (Day 44):
  - The new category of driving licences for automatic transmission cars will be implemented nationwide in June.
  - One person was killed when a double decker express bus plunged into a ravine off Tun Razak Highway at Sungai Jernih Estate near Bandar Tun Abdul Razak, Rompin, Pahang.
- 21 April
  - Malaysia Airlines Flight MH370 crash into Indian Ocean (Day 45):
  - Malaysia Airlines flight MH192 bound for Bangalore had to perform an air turn-back shortly to Kuala Lumpur International Airport (KLIA) after taking off. All passengers and crew are safe.
- 22 April – Malaysia Airlines Flight MH370 crash into Indian Ocean (Day 46):
  - Five military aircraft continued air search despite poor weather in Perth, Western Australia.
- 22 April
  - Menteri Besar of Selangor announced that the water rationing in the state will continue as the water level at the Sungai Selangor Dam is still at a critical level.
  - Four factory workers were seriously injured, two of them in a critical condition after the bus they were travelling crashed into the rear of a lorry near Sungai Petani South Interchange of the North–South Expressway.
- 23 April
  - Malaysia Airlines Flight MH370 crash into Indian Ocean (Day 47):
  - Ling Hee Leong, the eldest son of former MCA President Ling Liong Sik has settled a civil suit with his former girlfriend Teh Chee Yen over alleged breach of settlement agreement over assets.
  - Pirates, armed with pistols and parangs, robbed a Japanese oil tanker Naniwa Maru 1 before kidnapping three of its crew at 21.8 nautical miles off Tanjung Karang, Selangor.
- 24 April – Malaysia Airlines Flight MH370 crash into Indian Ocean (Day 48):
  - Debris consisting of riveted metal sheets washes up on the Western Australian coast. This is later confirmed to be unrelated to MH370.
- 25 April – Malaysia Airlines Flight MH370 crash into Indian Ocean (Day 49):
  - The Malaysian Federal Government will release a preliminary report on the disappearance of flight MH370.
- 26 April – Malaysia Airlines Flight MH370 crash into Indian Ocean (Day 50):
  - Yang di-Pertuan Agong Sultan Abdul Halim Mu'adzam Shah of Kedah thanks US president Barack Obama over US assistance in search for Malaysia Airlines Flight MH370.
- 26–28 April – US president Barack Obama visits Malaysia for the first time since Lyndon Baines Johnson in 1966.
  - At 4:50 pm, the Air Force One carrying US president Barack Obama arrived at Royal Malaysian Air Force (RMAF) Subang Air Bases.
  - US president Barack Obama participates in an arrival ceremony with the Yang di-Pertuan Agong Sultan Abdul Halim Mu'adzam Shah and the Prime Minister Mohammad Najib Abdul Razak in Parliament Square, Kuala Lumpur.
  - A state royal banquet in honour of visiting US president Barack Obama was held at the Istana Negara, Jalan Tuanku Abdul Halim, Kuala Lumpur and was attended by the Yang di-Pertuan Agong Sultan Abdul Halim Mu'adzam Shah, Raja Permaisuri Agong Sultanah Haminah Hamidun, Prime Minister Mohammad Najib Abdul Razak and his wife Rosmah Mansor.
  - Pos Malaysia started selling the commemorative stamps and first day cover in conjunction with the US president Barack Obama visits Malaysia.
- 27 April
  - TV9 celebrates its 8th anniversary it was established on 2006 (before on 22 April).
  - NTV7 celebrates its 16th anniversary it was established on 1998 (before on 7 April).
  - Malaysia Airlines Flight MH370 crash into Indian Ocean (Day 51):
  - Royal Malaysian Navy celebrates its 80th anniversary.
  - The pre-opening KLIA 2 open day.
  - A Universiti Islam Antarabangsa Malaysia (UIAM) official bus, carrying 32 students, veered off the highway and crashed at KM25 of the New Klang Valley Expressway (NKVE).
- 27 April – US president Barack Obama visits Malaysia (Day 2):
  - At 9:40 MST on morning, US president Barack Obama visits Masjid Negara (National Mosque) and Makam Pahlawan (Heroes Mausoleum), Kuala Lumpur.
  - US president Barack Obama meets Prime Minister Mohammad Najib Abdul Razak at Seri Perdana, Putrajaya.
  - US president Barack Obama and Prime Minister Mohammad Najib Abdul Razak officially launched the Malaysian Global Innovation and Creativity Centre (MaGIC) in Cyberjaya, Selangor.
  - US president Barack Obama participates in the Young Southeast Asian Leaders Initiative Town Hall at the University of Malaya, Kuala Lumpur.
- 28 April – Malaysia Airlines Flight MH370 crash into Indian Ocean (Day 52):
  - Australian Prime Minister Tony Abbott and Angus Houston of JACC announce that a larger area of the ocean floor would now be searched and there would be a suspension of aerial search due to likelihood that any wreckage would have sunk.
- 28 April – US president Barack Obama visits Malaysia (Day 3):
  - US president Barack Obama and Prime Minister Mohammad Najib Abdul Razak witnessed the memorandum of understanding (MoU) of the three leading Malaysian names tied-up with US companies in business deals totalling US2 billion dollars which includes the areas of aviation, biotech and insurance.
  - At 10:20 MST on morning, the Air Force One carrying US president Barack Obama leaves Royal Malaysian Air Force (RMAF) Subang Air Bases for Manila, Philippines.
- 28 April – A light aircraft from a flight training school here crashed landed at Taman Kurnia Jaya in Pengkalan Chepa, Kelantan. A pilot was injured in the crash.
- 29 April – Malaysia Airlines Flight MH370 crash into Indian Ocean (Day 53):
  - Australian land and sea survey company GeoResonance claim to have discovered materials that are "believed to be the wreckage of a commercial airliner" in the Bay of Bengal, approximately 100 miles (160 km) south of Bangladesh.
  - Two Royal Malaysian Air Force (RMAF) C-130 Hercules aircraft are return to Malaysia tonight after aerial searches for a missing Malaysia Airlines Flight MH370 plane were suspended following an announcement on the intensification of the underwater search.
- 30 April – Malaysia Airlines Flight MH370 crash into Indian Ocean (Day 54):
  - The Joint Agency Coordination Centre (JACC) are sceptic about GeoResonance's statement that they have discovered aircraft wreckage thousands of kilometres away from the current hypothesised location, and have dismissed that claim.
- 30 April
  - The water rationing in Selangor has now lifted begins 1 May.
  - Opening of the Express Rail Link (ERL) KLIA 2 station.

=== May ===
- 1 May
  - More than 10,000 people are gathered for the first major protest of 2014 as a coalition of 89 NGOs organise the May Day rally to campaign against the Goods and Services Tax (GST) at Merdeka Square, Kuala Lumpur.
  - A 150-year-old mansion was once owned by philanthropist and contractor Wong Ah Fook at Jalan Lumba Kuda, Johor Bahru, Johor is demolished.
  - The Malacca Sultanate ancient coins was found at Pulau Nangka, Malacca.
- 2 May – The commercial opening of the KLIA2, part of the Kuala Lumpur International Airport (KLIA).
- 6 May – Seputeh MP Teresa Kok was charged with sedition by the Session Court, Kuala Lumpur here over her controversial Chinese New Year video.
- 7 May – Six states including Negeri Sembilan, Johor, Perak, Kedah, Penang and Malacca were hit by a series of power failures for up to three hours.
- 9 May – The closing of the old Low Cost Carrier Terminal (LCCT), part of the Kuala Lumpur International Airport (KLIA). AirAsia and AirAsia X fleet were moved to KLIA2.
- 10 May
  - Barisan Nasional (BN) will not contest the 2014 Bukit Gelugor by-election.
  - Karpal Singh's son, Ramkarpal Singh from Democratic Action Party (DAP) will contest the 2014 Bukit Gelugor by-election as a Pakatan Rakyat candidates.
- 11 May – The Sabak Bernam Parti Keadilan Rakyat (PKR) branch elections turned chaotic when supporters of its candidates argued heatedly and hurled insults at one another, almost breaking into fist-cuffs.
- 12 May
  - Menteri Besar of Terengganu, Ahmad Said resigned and replaced by his successor Ahmad Razif Abdul Rahman. Later, Ahmad Said quits UMNO and become an independent seats for Kijal, Terengganu.
  - The Economic Transformation Programme (ETP) annual report 2013 is unveiled by the Prime Minister Mohammad Najib Abdul Razak.
  - Ajil assemblyman Ghazali Daud quits UMNO to become an independent seats.
- 14 May – Former Menteri Besar of Terengganu, Ahmad Said rejoins UMNO.
- 17–18 May – The 2014 Red Bull Air Race World Championship is held at Putrajaya Lake, Putrajaya, Malaysia.
- 17 May – Ipoh born chef Catherine Chin Wan Ping aka Ping Coombes wins MasterChef UK.
- 18 May
  - Prime Minister Mohammad Najib Abdul Razak made its 3-day official state visit to United Arab Emirates and meets the Crown Prince of Abu Dhabi, Sheikh Mohammed Zayed Al Nahyan.
  - Yang di-Pertuan Agong, Sultan Abdul Halim Mu'adzam Shah of Kedah made its 3-day official state visit to Singapore and meets the President, Tony Tan.
  - World no.1 squash player, Nicol Ann David wins British Open title.
- 20 May – Malaysia Airlines flight MH1348 from Kuala Lumpur to Langkawi which was hit by lightning strike, landed safely at Langkawi International Airport, Langkawi, Kedah.
- 21 May – The 40th anniversary of China–Malaysia relations:
  - The two giant pandas, Fu Wa and Feng Yi arrived at Kuala Lumpur International Airport (KLIA) from Chengdu, China, at 7:50 am. At 11:00 am, the two pandas arrived at Zoo Negara, Kuala Lumpur.
- 21 May – Death of Tunku Annuar ibni Almarhum Sultan Badlishah:
  - Tunku Bendahara of Kedah and also Chairman of the Council of Regency of Kedah, Tunku Annuar ibni Almarhum Sultan Badlishah died at 12:20 am at Pantai Hospital in Ipoh, Perak. His body was laid to rest at the Kedah Royal Mausoleum in Langgar, Kedah after Asr prayers. Kedah declares seven days of mourning period with the flag of Malaysia and the state flag of Kedah will be flown at half-mast and all entertainment activities are cancelled.
  - Former Prime Minister Mahathir Mohamad is appointed as Proton chairman.
- 22 May – The 40th anniversary of China–Malaysia relations:
  - Malaysia and China commemorates the 40th anniversary of diplomatic relations between both countries.
- 24 May – The Malaysian Department of Islamic Development (JAKIM) has suspended the halal certification of two Cadbury chocolate products that were found to contain porcine DNA.
- 25 May
  - Tengku Abdullah Sultan Ahmad Shah of Pahang is elected a new president of the Football Association of Malaysia (FAM) after defeating Tunku Ismail Idris Sultan Ibrahim of Johor 27–12 in FAM election.
  - Three foreign men suspected to be members of the Sri Lankan Liberation Tigers of Tamil Eelam (LTTE) terrorist group were arrested by the Malaysian police of the Special Branch's Counter-Terrorism Division (CTD) at different locations in Klang and Petaling districts, Selangor.
  - The Malaysian Badminton Team reached 2014 Thomas Cup finals for the first time in 12 Years meeting Japan, but was defeated 2–3 which saw the Japanese Badminton Team lifted their cup for the first time in history.
- 25 May – 2014 Bukit Gelugor by-election:
  - Democratic Action Party (DAP) candidate, Ramkarpal Singh wins this by-elections with a majority of 37,659 votes beating Parti Cinta Malaysia's (PCM) candidate Datuk Huan Cheng Guan and two independent candidates, Mohd Nabi Bux Mohd Nabo Sathar and Abu Backer Sidek Mohd Zan.
- 26 May – A policeman, Lance Corporal Mohd Azuan Abdullah was killed after he was knocked off his motorcycle by robbers that he was chasing it at Alor Pongsu, Perak.
- 27 May – The 40th anniversary of China–Malaysia relations: Malaysian Prime Minister, Mohammad Najib Abdul Razak arrives in China for 40th anniversary of diplomatic relations between both countries.
- 28 May – A soldier was shot dead while two civilians injured after a scuffle broke out outside a 24-hour sundry shop in Lahad Datu, Sabah.
- 28 May – Death of Sultan Azlan Muhibuddin Shah of Perak:
  - Sultan Azlan Muhibuddin Shah of Perak, the 34th Sultan of Perak and 9th Yang di-Pertuan Agong (1989–1994), died at the age of 86.
  - Menteri Besar of Perak Dato' Seri Zambry Abdul Kadir announced Perak declares 100 days of mourning period with the flag of Malaysia and the state flag of Perak will be flown at half-mast and all entertainment activities are cancelled.
- 29 May – Death of Sultan Azlan Muhibuddin Shah of Perak:
  - His body was laid to rest at Al Ghufran Royal Mausoleum in Kuala Kangsar, Perak. His son the Raja Muda of Perak Raja Nazrin Shah was proclaimed as the 35th Sultan of Perak with a title Sultan Nazrin Muizzuddin Shah ibni Almarhum Sultan Azlan Muhibuddin Shah Al-Maghfurlah.
- 30 May – The 40th anniversary of China–Malaysia relations:
  - Malaysian Prime Minister, Mohammad Najib Abdul Razak meets Chinese President, Xi Jinping in Beijing, China.
  - Pos Malaysia started selling the commemorative stamps and first day cover in celebration of 40th Anniversary of Malaysia–China Diplomatic Relations.
- 31 May – 2014 Telok Intan by-election:
  - Barisan Nasional (BN) wins back the Teluk Intan parliamentary seat after losing it to Democratic Action Party (DAP) in two previous general elections namely in 2008 and 2013. BN candidate, Datuk Mah Siew Keong wins this by-elections with a majority of 238 votes beating DAP candidate, Dyana Sofya Mohd Daud.

=== June ===
- 1 June – TV3 celebrates its 30th anniversary.
- 2 June – The government will introduce a new system beginning 1 September to ensure subsidised diesel and petrol is only sold to eligible commercial vehicles.
- 3 June – Cadbury Malaysia affirmed that all its chocolates made and sold in Malaysia are halal. New tests conducted by the Chemistry Department found that chocolate bars made by British confectioner Cadbury do not contain pig DNA, contrary to a previous finding.
- 4 June – Several parts of northern Kuala Lumpur including Kuala Lumpur Middle Ring Road 2 (MRR2) and the International Islamic University Malaysia (IIUM) Campus in Gombak were hit by flash floods.
- 5 June – A nine-year-old boy was trapped nearly 30-minutes in his grandfather's car after the vehicle was buried in a landslide at Taman Cheng Perdana, Cheng, Malacca.
- 9 June – Prime Minister Mohammad Najib Abdul Razak made its two-day official state visit to Turkmenistan and meets the President, Gurbanguly Berdimuhamedov.
- June – The El Nino phenomenon has begun.
- 10 June
  - A fire occurred at a location of the SSGP in the Lawas, Limbang Division, Sarawak, about 135 km from the Sabah Oil & Gas Terminal in Kimanis, Interior Division, Sabah, which is the starting point of the pipeline.
  - Cadbury Malaysia received its halal certification back from the Malaysian Department of Islamic Development (JAKIM) after laboratory test results confirmed its chocolates are free from porcine DNA.
- 11 June – American female pop singer-songwriter's Taylor Swift: "The Red Tour" held her first music concert at Putra Indoor Stadium in Kuala Lumpur, Malaysia
- 14 June
  - Malaysia Airlines (MAS) retired the Boeing 737-400 passenger aircraft from its fleet, 24 years after it entered the carrier's service in 1990.
  - Official opening of the Pinewood Iskandar Malaysia Studios (PIMS) in Nusajaya, Johor.
- 15 June
  - The missing Malaysia Airlines Flight MH370 has now turn 100 days.
  - A Malaysian student Ummi Nadiah Filzah Daud died to her injuries following a road accident in Alexandria, Egypt, on 1 June.
- 16 June – The Royal Malaysian Navy (RMN) ship KD Terengganu rescued the tanker Mt Ai Maru which was captured by pirates south of Pulau Aur, Mersing, Johor.
- 18 June – A boat carrying a total of 97 people capsized off the western coast of Selangor, near Sungai Air Hitam, Banting.
- 21 June
  - The Kota Raja Parti Keadilan Rakyat (PKR) branch elections turned chaotic when supporters of its candidates argued heatedly and hurled insults at one another.
  - Kem Majidee army camp in Johor Bahru, Johor, one of the oldest in Malaysia, is officially closed.
- 22 June – A 15-year-old handicapped boy was found neglected and malnourished at a flats unit in Taman Semarak, Nilai, Negeri Sembilan by Immigration Department officers, on a crackdown against illegal immigrants.
- 23 June
  - President of Tajikistan, Emomali Rahmon made his 3-day official visits to Malaysia.
  - The Federal Court dismissed the application by the publisher of The Herald to challenge the Home Ministry's ban on the use of the word Allah in the Malay Language edition of the Catholic weekly publication.
- 24 June
  - A haze affected at most parts of the Peninsular Malaysia caused by El Nino phenomenon.
  - The Official Opening Ceremony of the KLIA2, part of the Kuala Lumpur International Airport (KLIA) by the Prime Minister Mohammad Najib Abdul Razak.
- 25 June – The 40th anniversary of China–Malaysia relations:
  - The local names of the two giant pandas which arrived in Malaysia last month. Feng Yi and Fu Wa are now to be called Xing Xing and Liang Liang.
- 25 June – Prime Minister Mohammad Najib Abdul Razak has announced a minor cabinet reshuffle. Six new additions in Cabinet line-up from Malaysian Chinese Association (MCA) and Gerakan.
- 26 June – 2014 Klang Valley water crisis:
  - Three million Klang Valley citizens may face the unscheduled water cuts.
- 26 June – The men's hostel block of the International Islamic University Malaysia (IIUM) in Section 16, Petaling Jaya was caught fire in afternoon.
- 27 June – The 40th anniversary of China–Malaysia relations:
  - Bank Negara Malaysia started selling the commemorative coins in celebration of 40th Anniversary of Malaysia–China Diplomatic Relations.

=== July ===
Route of the Malaysia Airlines Flight MH17

- 1 July – 17 October – The Pentaksiran Tingkatan Tiga (PT3) examinations replacing the Penilaian Menengah Rendah (PMR) examinations is held for the first time.
- 2 July – A sinkhole occurred at Jalan Hang Tuah–Jalan Pudu–Jalan Imbi junctions near the site of Pudu Prison, Kuala Lumpur. No casualties reported.
- 3 July
  - At least six explosions were heard in a mid-day fire that swept through Kampung Pondo at Pulau Gaya, Sabah. The explosions were caused by detonators believed used to make fish bombs.
  - Two army personnel died while two others were seriously injured after their armoured fighting vehicle hit a divider and crashed on its side at the North–South Expressway near Kuala Kangsar, Perak.
- 5 July – "Biduanita Negara" (National Songstress), veteran singer and entertainer, Sharifah Aini dies due to lung fibrosis at the age of 61 at Damansara Specialist Hospital, Damansara Utama, Selangor. She was laid to rest at Bukit Kiara Muslim Cemetery, Kuala Lumpur.
- 6 July – Malaysia Airlines Flight MH370 crash into Indian Ocean:
  - Malaysia will deploy another Royal Malaysian Navy vessel, the KD Mutiara, on 4 August, to join the search efforts of the missing Malaysia Airlines Flight MH370 in Indian Ocean.
- 8 July – Prime Minister Mohammad Najib Abdul Razak has announced the restructuring of the Eastern Sabah Security Command (ESSCOM) with the setting up of two major components – security and defence management as well as enforcement and public action.
- 9 July – Prime Minister Mohammad Najib Abdul Razak condemned the Israeli Defence Force (IDF) air strikes on the Gaza Strip and called for an immediate cessation of military operations. He stressed that peace can only come with the creation of a viable two-state solution and all parties should adhere to this principle.
- 11 July – Political leaders from both sides of the political divide were united in condemning Israel as its air strikes on the Gaza Strip.
- 13 July – A policeman was killed and a second was kidnapped after heavily armed gunmen opened fire at a diving resort off Mabul Island near Semporna, Sabah.
- 14 July
  - Prime Minister Mohammad Najib Abdul Razak, and Youth and Sports Minister Khairy Jamaluddin were among the thousands that thronged Merdeka Square, Kuala Lumpur early Monday to catch the World Cup final 2014, in which Germany beat Argentina 1–0.
  - Two people died and 19 others are feared drowned after a boat with 80 Indonesian illegal immigrants capsized off Tanjung Piai near Pontian, Johor.
- 15 July – Malaysia will send humanitarian aid to Gaza Strip in two weeks.
- 16 July – The Federal Government has agreed to impose the Vehicle Entry Permit (VEP) charge soon on Singapore vehicles entering Johor.
- 17 July – Malaysia condemned 'in the strongest terms' Israel's continuing military aggression in Gaza since 7 July through a series of air strikes and other military action, which has resulted in the deaths of 220 Palestinians, among them women and children, and injury of more than 1,500 others.
- 17 July – The Boeing 777-2H6ER of the Malaysia Airlines Flight MH17 which carrying 283 passengers and 15 crew members onboard from Amsterdam to Kuala Lumpur was shootdown and crashed in eastern Ukraine near Russian border with no survivors.
  - 6:00 pm: Scheduled time of departure of Malaysia Airlines (MAS) flight MH17, a Boeing 777-2H6ER, from Amsterdam's Schiphol Airport.
  - 6.15 pm: MH17 departs from Amsterdam, the Netherlands, carrying 280 passengers and 15 crew.
  - 10:15 pm: Malaysia Airlines confirms it received notification from Ukrainian Air Traffic Control (ATC) that it had lost contact with MH17 at 30 km from Tamak waypoint, approximately 50 km from the Russia–Ukraine border.
  - 11:30 pm: MH17 presumably crashes. MAS releases official tweet,"Malaysia Airlines has lost contact of MH17 from Amsterdam. The last known position was over Ukrainian airspace. More details to follow."
  - 11.40 pm: Moscow based news agency Interfax says Malaysian passenger airliner was shootdown at altitude of 10 km above Eastern Ukraine:
    - They confirmed the location of a burning Malaysian plane in eastern Ukraine.
    - The Ukrainian Interior Ministry also confirmed that all passengers and crew are dead. The aircraft was "shot down" while cruising at an altitude of 30,000 ft.
    - Igor Strelkov, the military commander of pro-Russia separatists, posted on social media shortly before MH17's crash that rebel forces had brought down an Antonov An-26, an aircraft commonly used by Ukrainian forces, in the same area.
- 18 July – Malaysia Airlines Flight MH17 crash:
  - Prime Minister Mohammad Najib Abdul Razak tweets, "I am shocked by reports that an MH plane crashed. We are launching an immediate investigation."
  - Prime Minister Mohammad Najib Abdul Razak has confirmed that the Malaysia Airlines Flight MH17 which went down in Eastern Ukraine did not give out a distress call.
  - Malaysia Airlines confirms that MH17 was carrying a total of 298 people – 283 passengers, including three infants of various nationalities, and 15 Malaysian crew members – and not 295, as previously reported.
  - All European flights operated by Malaysia Airlines would be taking alternative routes and avoiding the usual route with immediate effect.
  - A special team from Malaysia has been dispatched to Kyiv, Ukraine, to assist the discovery and identification of victims from the crashed Malaysia Airlines (MAS) flight MH17.
  - In a special address that was televised live on Friday, Prime Minister Mohammad Najib Abdul Razak said:
    - An emergency Parliament sitting on Wednesday (23 July) will be called to condemn the "inhumane act" responsible for the fate of Malaysia Airlines flight MH17, which had gone down in the eastern Ukraine on Thursday night (17 July).
    - The flag of Malaysia around the country to be flown half-mast beginning on Friday (18 July) until this Monday (21 July).
    - All Muslims in the country, regardless of their political affiliation, to perform a solat hajat (special prayer) and doa with hope that nation to be always safe from disasters and threats.
- 19 July – The curfew order at Sabah's east coast waters are enforced from today starting 6:00 pm to 6:00 am for 14 days. The affected areas are Sandakan, Kinabatangan, Lahad Datu, Kunak, Semporna and Tawau.
- 19 July – Malaysia Airlines Flight MH17 crash:
  - Menteri Besar of Kedah, Mukhriz Mahathir ordered that both national and state flag in all government buildings in the state will be flown at half-mast until Monday following the tragedy that befell the Malaysia Airlines (MAS) flight MH17.
  - The Malaysian Armed Forces (MAF) will dispatch two C-130 Hercules aircraft to Ukraine to assist the Malaysia Airlines (MAS), MH17 Post-tragedy Investigation and Management Team in its operations.
  - Malaysia Airlines has released the complete list of 283 passengers and 15 crew names of the flight MH17 crash.
  - Transport Minister Liow Tiong Lai will fly to the Ukraine capital of Kyiv to ensure an investigating team gets safe access to the site of the downed Malaysia Airlines Flight MH17.
- 20 July – Malaysia Airlines Flight MH17 crash:
  - Yang di-Pertuan Agong Sultan Abdul Halim Mu'adzam Shah of Kedah and Raja Permaisuri Agong Sultanah Haminah Hamidun expressed their deepest grief over the incident involving Malaysia Airlines flight MH17, which had gone down in the eastern Ukraine on Thursday (17 July).
  - The Government is determined to bring home the remains of Malaysians onboard MH17 before Hari Raya Aidilfitri so that they could be accorded with proper burial.
  - The Royal Malaysian Air Force (RMAF) has commissioned two C-130 Hercules aircraft to bring back remains of the Malaysia Airlines Flight MH17 crash victims.
  - Rebels have recovered the black boxes from downed Malaysia Airlines Flight 17.
- 21 July – The iconic 24-hour drive-in A&W Restaurant in Petaling Jaya, Selangor, will close down by the end of this year, making way for a commercial-cum-office block redevelopment.
- 21 July – Malaysia Airlines Flight MH17 crash:
  - Malaysia is demanding immediate and unrestricted access to the Malaysia Airlines MH17 crash site and guaranteed safety for its officials and those of the joint international investigation team.
  - Prime Minister Mohammad Najib Abdul Razak had a discussion with self-proclaimed Prime Minister of the Donetsk People's Republic, Alexander Borodai. In the discussion, Najib asked Borodai to hand over the remains of 282 people to representatives from the Netherlands, to hand over the two black boxes to a Malaysian team in Donetsk and to assure safe access to crash site to the international investigators.
  - Malaysia will send three aviation experts into the MH17 crash site after finally receiving the green light to do so.
  - The trains loaded with the bodies of Malaysia Airlines Flight MH17 passengers pulled away from the Torez station in eastern Ukraine.
  - The body of the MH17 victims will send to the Netherlands for identified.
  - The two black boxes of the MH17 was handed over to Malaysian experts in Donetsk at 9:00 pm Ukraine time.
- 22 July – Siti Fairrah Ashykin Kamaruddin, better known as Kiki, who was filmed abusing an elderly man and hammering his vehicle with a steering lock in Kuantan, Pahang, pleaded guilty to the charge of causing mischief and damage. She was fined RM 5,000 or in default three months' jail and order her to perform 240 hours of community service.
- 22 July – Malaysia Airlines Flight MH17 crash:
  - A train carrying the remains of some of the nearly 300 victims of the Malaysia Airlines plane downed over Ukraine was heading for Ukrainian government territory as a separatist leader handed over the plane's black boxes to Malaysian experts.
  - A total of 200 people congregated at Russian embassy here at Jalan Ampang, Kuala Lumpur, to show solidarity with the country and the victims of those on board Malaysia Airlines (MAS) MH17.
- 23 July – Malaysia Airlines Flight MH17 crash:
  - An emergency Parliament sitting is held in Dewan Rakyat to condemn the "inhumane act" responsible for the fate of Malaysia Airlines flight MH17, which had gone down in the eastern Ukraine on Thursday night (17 July).
  - The first plane carrying bodies from downed Malaysia Airlines flight MH17 left eastern Ukraine for the Netherlands.
  - The black boxes from downed Malaysia Airlines flight MH17 arrived in Britain for analysis by air accident investigators.
  - Two planes carrying the first bodies from Malaysian Airways flight MH17, shot down over Ukraine last week, arrived at the Eindhoven Airport, Netherlands. The remains were will later be taken to Hilversum, about 100 km from here, for the full identification process.
- 23 July – 3 August – 2014 Commonwealth Games in Glasgow, Scotland:
  - Malaysian team wins 6 gold, 7 silver and 6 bronze in this games.
  - The Malaysian national athletes remembered the victims of flight MH17 with the first row of athletes wearing Malaysia Airlines uniforms at the Glasgow 2014 Commonwealth Games opening ceremony. Fatehah Mustafa carried the flag of Malaysia which was be flown at half-mast while the rest of the contingent wore black armbands, seeking justice for MH17.
- 24 July – Malaysia Airlines Flight MH17 crash:
  - The cabinet ministers' 2014 Hari Raya Aidilfitri 2014 open house has been cancelled out of respect to those, who perished in the flight MH17 crash.
  - The remains of 43 Malaysian victims of Malaysia Airlines MH17 are not expected arrive home to the country before Hari Raya Aidilfitri.
  - ASEAN and European Union ministers meeting in Brussels have condemned in the strongest terms the downing of Malaysia Airlines flight MH17.
  - A total of 39 Malaysian disaster victim identification (DVI) personnel will be helping to carry out identification and post-mortem of the MH17 victims brought to the Hilversum medical military base in the Netherlands.
  - Defence Minister, Hishammuddin Hussein says, Malaysia has agreed to appoint two ministers, to handle the funeral process of MH17 victims. The two ministers are, Ministers in the Prime Minister's Department, Jamil Khir Baharom, who will handle the remains of the Muslim victims, and Joseph Kurup, for the non-Muslim victims.
  - The federal government will be providing a special grave site in Taman Selatan at Precinct 20, Putrajaya for Muslim victims of the downed Malaysia Airlines (MAS) flight MH17. The special site has been identified at the burial ground, and victims' families will then have a choice whether to have the bodies buried in Putrajaya or in their respective hometowns.
  - About 500 people attended a "tahlil" and recite the "Sura Yasin" organised by Malaysia Airlines (MAS) to pray for the MH17 crash victims at Tengku Kelana Jaya Putera Mosque in Kelana Jaya, Selangor.
- 25 July – Malaysia Airlines Flight MH17 crash:
  - State governments have also cancelled or postponed open house events in conjunction with 2014 Hari Raya Aidilfitri as a mark of respect for victims of the Malaysia Airlines (MAS) flight MH17 crash tragedy.
  - More than 500 people of various races and religions gathered at the Malaysia Airlines Academy in Kelana Jaya, Selangor, to offer special prayers in memory of the 298 passengers and crew on board flight MH17.
- 26 July – The Malaysian Highway Authority (LLM) has announced an increase of more than 400% for the toll rates at the Sultan Iskandar Building Customs, Immigration and Quarantine (CIQ) Complex in Johor Bahru starting 1 August.
- 26 July – Malaysia Airlines Flight MH17 crash:
  - Yang di-Pertuan Agong Sultan Abdul Halim Mu'adzam Shah of Kedah and Raja Permaisuri Agong Sultanah Haminah Hamidun arrived at Putrajaya Marriott Hotel to visit next-of-kin of passengers on board the ill-fated Malaysia Airline (MAS) flight MH17.
  - The remnants of the Malaysia special investigation team for the MH17 crash returned to Kuala Lumpur from Ukraine.
  - The bodies of 43 Malaysians killed in MH17 crash may arrive only next month.
- 28 July – Malaysia Airlines Flight MH17 crash:
  - Prime Minister Mohammad Najib Abdul Razak and his wife Rosmah Mansor met with the families of the Malaysian passengers and crew of the two Malaysia Airlines (MAS) air tragedies, at Seri Perdana, Putrajaya.
- 30 July – Malaysia Airlines Flight MH17 crash:
  - 68 Malaysian police personnel will leave Kuala Lumpur for MH17 crash site in eastern Ukraine as part of international deployment.
  - Prime Minister Mohammad Najib Abdul Razak arrives in the Netherlands to meet his counterpart Mark Rutte to discuss efforts to secure full and safe access to the MH17 crash site in eastern Ukraine.
- 31 July – Malaysia Airlines Flight MH17 crash:
  - In a meeting with Dutch counterpart, Mark Rutte. Prime Minister Mohammad Najib Abdul Razak appealed for an "immediate cessation" of fighting between Ukraine government forces and rebels around the crash site of flight MH17 near the Russian border.
  - Prime Minister Mohammad Najib Abdul Razak and his wife Rosmah Mansor observed a moment of silence at the entrance of a military facility in Hilversum, Netherlands, where the remains of victims of the Malaysia Airline (MAS) Flight MH17 tragedy are undergoing the Disaster Victim Identification (DVI).

=== August ===
- 1 August – Scores of Malaysian factory workers travelling to Singapore were forced to walk across the Johor Causeway after factory buses refused to cross the Sultan Iskandar Building Customs, Immigration and Quarantine (CIQ) checkpoint in Johor Bahru, Johor, following the implementation of new toll charges.
- 1 August – Malaysia Airlines Flight MH17 crash:
  - Prime Minister Mohammad Najib Abdul Razak said that the government will declare a day of mourning when the first of the bodies of Malaysian victims in the MH17 tragedy are flown home.
  - Disaster Victims Identification (DVI) team in Hilversum, Netherlands, has identified Malaysians among the bodies sent to them from Kharkiv, Ukraine.
- 2 August – At least 15,000 people gathered at Merdeka Square, Kuala Lumpur, in a rally aimed at showing solidarity with Palestinians in Gaza, and to protest against Israel's want on targeting of innocent women and children.
- 2 August – Malaysia Airlines Flight MH17 crash:
  - Families of Malaysia Airlines (MAS) Flight MH17 crash victims are willing to accept their personal belongings if no remains of their loved ones are found.
  - About 500 people took part in a walk in Ipoh, Perak, as a sign of their empathy and sympathy for those who perished in the Malaysia Airlines (MAS) Flight MH17 tragedy on 17 July
- 4 August – Malaysia Airlines Flight MH370 crash into Indian Ocean:
  - Royal Malaysian naval ship, KD Mutiara has set sail to Indian Ocean in search of Malaysia Airlines Flight 370.
- 4 August – Malaysia Airlines Flight MH17 crash:
  - Members of the Royal Malaysia Police (PDRM) Special Investigating Team, headed by Inspector-General of Police Tan Sri Khalid Abu Bakar, which arrived at the Malaysia Airlines (MAS) flight MH17 crash site in Donetsk, Ukraine, cannot enter the area due to shooting incidents.
  - A plane carrying remains of victims from downed flight MH17 arrived in The Netherlands as Malaysian experts joined the international probe at the crash site in eastern Ukraine.
- 5 August – Melaka state government enforced the Roman-Jawi script rules at all premises of federal, state, local government and agencies in the state.
- 5 August – Malaysia Airlines Flight MH17 crash:
  - All 228 coffins containing the remains of the flight MH17 victims are expected to be opened by the end of this week as the disaster victim identification (DVI) process continues at Hilversum, Netherlands, said the National Security Council (MKN).
- 6 August – Two British medical students from Newcastle University were murdered after reportedly being attacked by a gang of drunken men in Abell Road, Kuching, Sarawak.
- 6 August – Malaysia Airlines Flight MH17 crash:
  - The Muslim community in Amsterdam, the Netherlands is assisting representatives of the Malaysia Islamic Development Department (JAKIM) in managing the remains of Malaysian victims of the flight MH17 plane crash.
  - The investigation into the flight MH17 crash incident in eastern Ukraine has now reached 50 percent based on the evidence gathered at the crash site and accounts from eyewitnesses.
- 7 August – Penang police are to seek the help of Interpol to trace eight foreigners who were among the 15 people who had participated in a nude activity at the Teluk Kampi beach of the Penang National Park. The eight foreigners comprised four people from Singapore, two from Myanmar and one each from the Philippines and India.
- 7 August – Malaysia Airlines Flight MH17 crash:
  - Defence Minister, Hishamuddin Hussein said that the process of repatriating the bodies of victims of the doomed Malaysia Airlines Flight MH17 aircraft from Amsterdam may need to be done in stages, considering family requests as well as enabling investigations to be conducted.
- 8 August – Penang police have detained a female participant who took part in the "naked sports event" in Teluk Kampi, Penang National Park, Penang.
- 8 August – Malaysia Airlines Flight MH17 crash:
  - Following two disasters earlier this year, the Malaysia Airlines will be delisted from the Bursa Malaysia after sovereign wealth fund Khazanah Nasional Berhad made an offer to buy out minority shareholders in the carrier.
  - The Rural and Regional Development Ministry will coordinate the management of the remains of victims of the Malaysia Airlines Flight MH17 tragedy in the respective states.
- 9 August – 2014 Kajang Move crisis
  - Menteri Besar of Selangor, Abdul Khalid Ibrahim has been sacked from Parti Keadilan Rakyat (PKR) with immediate effect.
- 9 August – Malaysia Airlines Flight MH17 crash:
  - Defence Minister, Hishammuddin Hussein denied reports in the social media that Malaysia Airlines (MAS) flight MH17 was shot down by fighter jets.
- 10 August – Malaysia Airlines Flight MH17 crash:
  - The first batch of the special police team assigned to the crash site of flight MH17 in eastern Ukraine has returned to Malaysia.
  - The special Royal Malaysia Police team entrusted to carry out search and investigation on the downing of flight MH17 was allowed to enter the crash site in Donetsk, Ukraine, only two to three times throughout their 10-day stint there.
  - Defence Minister Hishammuddin Hussein suggested that the entire nation observe a minute's silence when the remains Malaysia Airlines (MAS) flight MH17 victims arrive, here.
- 11 August – 2014 Kajang Move crisis
  - Abdul Khalid Ibrahim will remain as Menteri Besar of Selangor after receiving consent from the Sultan of Selangor, Sultan Sharafuddin Idris Shah.
  - The Sultan of Selangor, Sultan Sharafuddin Idris Shah rejects a request by PKR's de facto leader Anwar Ibrahim for a meeting between him and the party's candidate for the Menteri besar post, Wan Azizah Wan Ismail.
- 11 August – Malaysia Airlines Flight MH17 crash:
  - Prime Minister Mohammad Najib Abdul Razak expressed his appreciation to the disaster victim identification (DVI) team from Malaysia involving the downed Malaysia Airlines flight MH17.
- 12 August – 2014 Kajang Move crisis
  - Menteri Besar of Selangor Abdul Khalid Ibrahim said he had written a letter to the Sultan of Selangor Sultan Sharafuddin Idris Shah to advise for all Democratic Action Party (DAP) and PKR excos except for Rodziah Ismail, to be sacked.
  - The Sultan of Selangor, Sultan Sharafuddin Idris Shah has consented to the sacking of three DAP and two PKR excos. These include DAP leaders Teng Chang Khim, Ean Yong Hian Wah and V. Ganabatirau as well as PKR leaders Elizabeth Wong Keat Peng and Dr Daroyah Alwi.
  - DAP and PKR condemned embattled Selangor Menteri Besar, Abdul Khalid Ibrahim for sacking six state executive councillors from the two parties.
- 12 August – Malaysia Airlines Flight MH17 crash:
  - The remains of 16 of the 43 Malaysian victims of the Malaysia Airlines (MAS) flight MH17 plane tragedy have been identified.
  - The parade and procession in conjunction with Merdeka Day at the Merdeka Square, Kuala Lumpur will go ahead on 31 August.
- 13 August – Malaysia Airlines Flight MH370 crash into Indian Ocean:
  - A total of RM111,000 was reportedly withdrawn from the accounts of four passengers who were on board the missing flight MH370 plane.
- 13 August – Malaysia Airlines Flight MH17 crash:
  - The government has given complete freedom to all families of Malaysia Airlines (MAS) flight MH17 crash victims on the funeral and burial rites of their loved ones.
  - The Sura Ya Sin and tahlil prayers for six Muslim victims killed in the crash was held on Tuesday (12 August) and Wednesday (13 August) by the Chief Imam of Putra Mosque, Putrajaya, Malaysia, Abdul Manaf Mat at The Hague, the Netherlands.
  - Malaysia will once again have access to the crash site of the ill-fated Malaysia Airlines MH17 flight in eastern Ukraine.
- 14 August – 2014 Kajang Move crisis
  - Parti Keadilan Rakyat (PKR) exco Rodziah Ismail resigns.
- 14 August – Malaysia Airlines Flight MH17 crash:
  - Deputy Prime Minister Muhyiddin Yassin declares that 22 August will be a national day of mourning for victims of MH17 when the remains of 15 victims is expected to arrive in Malaysia on a special flight. There will be no public holiday during national day of mourning.
- 15 August – The "Pray for Malaysia" programme is held at Merdeka Square, Kuala Lumpur, in conjunction with the National Day is symbolic of the strength and solidarity of Malaysians in facing difficulties. Deputy Prime Minister Muhyiddin Yassin and several other cabinet ministers joined more than 20,000 people to pray for the nation's prosperity during the event.
- 15 August – Malaysia Airlines Flight MH17 crash:
  - The Rural and Regional Development Ministry has been making meticulous preparations in coordinating the sending of the Malaysia Airlines (MAS) Flight MH17 crash victims for burial in their respective hometowns.
  - The Sabah government has cancelled the state-level 'Ambang Merdeka' (Merdeka Eve) celebration scheduled for 30 August at Lintasan Deasoka, Kota Kinabalu, as a mark of respect for the victims of the Malaysia Airlines Flight MH17 tragedy.
- 16–28 August – 2014 Summer Youth Olympics in Nanjing, China:
  - Malaysia sent 20 athletes to participate in 11 sports in this games and won 2 medals consist of 1 Silver and 1 Bronze by Loh Zhiayi in diving events in addition to 1 Gold and 1 Silver from mixed gender events in Badminton and Archery by Cheam June Wei and Muhamad Zarif Syahiir respectively.
- 16 August – Malaysia Airlines Flight MH17 crash:
  - The Sarawak government also cancelled the state-level 57th Merdeka celebration this year.
  - The remains of four non-Muslim victims of the Malaysia Airlines (MAS) MH17 crash is conducted with full religious rituals of Buddhist, Taoist and Sikhs at the Monuta Innemee funeral home in The Hague, the Netherlands.
- 17 August – Malaysia Airlines Flight MH17 crash:
  - The remains of two more Malaysian victims, both of whom are non-Muslims, have been identified by the Netherlands authorities, bringing to date 26 Malaysians identified in the Malaysia Airlines (MAS) Flight MH17 tragedy.
  - At least 22 bodies of Malaysian victims from the MH17 tragedy will be flown home from Amsterdam to Kuala Lumpur on 21 August. The bodies, 18 in caskets and four cremated remains in urns, will be flown home on a special flight which will depart at noon from Schiphol International Airport in Amsterdam, the Netherlands.
- 18 August – Three Bangladeshi workers were killed when concrete blocks at the Sungai Buloh–Kajang MRT Line construction site in Kota Damansara, Selangor, collapsed.
- 18 August – Malaysia Airlines Flight MH17 crash:
  - Prime Minister Mohammad Najib Abdul Razak has congratulated the Malaysian Disaster Victim Identification (DVI) medical team for performing their duties related to the Malaysia Airlines (MAS) flight MH17 mishap with full integrity.
  - The flag of Malaysia will be flown at half-mast on 22 August which declared as the national Mourning Day.
- 19 August
  - Two soldiers were killed while two others were injured after an armoured vehicle they were in overturned near kilometre 30 of the Jalan Sungai Tiram in Sandakan, Sabah.
  - MRT Corporation Sdn Bhd (MRT) chief executive officer Azhar Abdul Hamid has resigned, less than 24 hours after a concrete block collapsed in Kota Damansara, Selangor, last night (18 August) resulting in three deaths.
  - Over 200 employees and customers of Kamdar textile mall in Jalan Tuanku Abdul Rahman, Kuala Lumpur were evacuated after fire broke at the building's first floor.
- 19 August – Malaysia Airlines Flight MH17 crash:
  - Five Malaysian victims of MH17 were given their final rites and prayers at the Monuta Innemee funeral home in The Hague, Netherlands.
  - Two more victims of the Malaysia Airlines flight MH17 tragedy have been identified, bringing the total number of those identified to 28 so far.
  - Raja of Perlis Tuanku Syed Sirajuddin expressed his condolences and heartfelt sympathy towards the family and friends of the 298 people who perished in the Malaysia Airlines (MAS) flight MH17 tragedy.
  - Burial arrangements are being made for two victims who perished in flight MH17 tragedy to have their remains buried at the Taman Selatan cemetery at Precinct 20, Putrajaya this Friday (22 August).
- 20 August – Malaysia Airlines Flight MH17 crash:
  - The government had confirmed that there will be 20 remains of the ill-fated Malaysia Airlines (MAS) flight MH17 that would return home on the national day of mourning this Friday.
  - The state flag of Penang will be flown at half-mast on the national day of mourning on Friday (22 August), as a mark of respect and sympathy to the victims of flight MH17.
  - Radio Televisyen Malaysia (RTM) will broadcast live the ceremonial honours for the Malaysia Airlines flight MH17 tragedy crash victims at the grounds of the Bunga Raya Complex in Kuala Lumpur International Airport (KLIA) on Friday (22 August) from 7:30 am.
  - The government has called for a moment of silence on Friday (22 August) when the remains of 20 passengers on board the ill-fated Malaysia Airlines flight MH17 arrive home. The minute of silence will starting from 10:45 to 11:15 am on Friday (22 August) and all vehicles and public transportations should temporarily stop during the moment of silence. Several locations across the country where traffic will be put on hold during the minute of silence, including the Penang Bridge, Sultan Abdul Halim Muadzam Shah Bridge the road in front of the Sultan Abdul Samad Building in Kuala Lumpur, the Sultan Iskandar Building Customs, Immigration and Quarantine (CIQ) Complex in Johor Bahru and one soon-to-be determined location each in Sabah and Sarawak.
- 21 August – Malaysia Airlines Flight MH17 crash:
  - The government has released 20 names of Malaysians who perished onboard Malaysia Airlines flight MH17.
  - Traffic from the mainland heading to Penang will be stopped at the toll plazas of the two bridges of Penang Bridge and Sultan Abdul Halim Muadzam Shah Bridge on Friday during the one minute of silence to honour the victims of the Malaysia Airlines flight MH17 tragedy.
  - The final journey home for MH17 victims (1st batch):
    - 8:00 pm (Malaysia Time) : 1:00 pm (Local Time) – The remains of 20 Malaysian MH17 victims have been loaded onto the Malaysia Airlines Boeing 747-400F aircraft (codenamed: MH6129) at Schiphol International Airport in Amsterdam, Netherlands.
    - 9:40 pm (Malaysia Time) : 2:40 pm (Local Time) – The special flight Malaysia Airlines MH6129 bearing the remains of 20 Malaysian victims of the MH17 tragedy has left Amsterdam on its way to Kuala Lumpur.
- 22 August – Malaysia Airlines Flight MH17 crash:
  - National Mourning Day of Malaysia for Malaysia Airlines Flight MH17 victims:
    - 9:54 am – The special flight Malaysia Airlines MH6129 bearing the remains of 20 Malaysian victims of the MH17 tragedy arrives at Bunga Raya Complex of the Kuala Lumpur International Airport (KLIA).
    - 10:10 am – 10:45 am – All 20 remains of the MH17 victims have been loaded into hearse.
    - 10:45 am – 11:15 am – A minute of silence is held at all over country.
    - 11:15 am – The hearse carrying 13, the Eurocopter EC-725 helicopter carrying 5 and C-130 Hercules plane carrying 2 (both from Royal Malaysian Air Force) has left Kuala Lumpur International Airport (KLIA).
    - 12:30 pm – 2:00 pm – The Yang di-Pertuan Agong Sultan Abdul Halim Mu'adzam Shah of Kedah attended Friday prayers followed by solat jenazah ghaib, and tahlil prayers for the flight MH17 victims at Putra Mosque, Putrajaya.
    - 12:00 pm – 4:00 pm – The remains of MH17 Muslim victims has finally laid to rest at respective hometowns in Taiping, Ipoh and Teluk Intan in Perak, Putrajaya, and Kuala Lumpur in Klang Valley, Seremban, in Negeri Sembilan, Muar and Segamat in Johor and Kuching in Sarawak.
- 23 August – A flash floods in Cheras Highway near Cheras Leisure Mall in Cheras, Kuala Lumpur caused a massive traffic congestion in many parts of the city centre.
- 23 August – Malaysia Airlines Flight MH17 crash:
  - MH17 victim funerals
    - The ashes of the cremated body of Karamjit Singh Karnail Singh, who was on board the ill-fated Malaysia Airlines (MAS) flight MH17, are immersed in the sea off Port Klang.
  - The final journey home for MH17 victims (2nd batch):
    - The two remains of the MH17 victims has left Amsterdam on its way to Kuala Lumpur by special flight Malaysia Airlines MH19.
- 24 August – Malaysian Mohd Nasarudin Mohd Yusof, a member of the Organisation for the Prohibition of Chemical Weapons (OPCW) wins Nobel Peace Prize. He is the first ever Malaysian to win this Nobel Prize.
- 24 August – Malaysia Airlines Flight MH17 crash:
  - The final journey home for MH17 victims (2nd batch):
    - 8:30 am – The special flight Malaysia Airlines MH19 bearing the remains of two Malaysian victims of the MH17 tragedy, Malaysia Airlines chief steward, Mohd Ghafar Abu Bakar and Universiti Malaysia Sabah (UMS) lecturer, Ng Shi Ing arrives at Bunga Raya Complex of the Kuala Lumpur International Airport (KLIA).
    - 8:35 am – 8:40 am – All two remains of the MH17 victims have been loaded into hearse.
    - 8:41 am – A minute of silence is held at all over country.
    - 11:45 am – The remains of the MH17 tragedy, Malaysia Airlines chief steward, Mohd Ghafar Abu Bakar has finally laid to rest at Taman Kosas Muslim Cemetery, Ampang, Selangor.
  - MH17 victim funerals
    - The remains of Malaysia Airlines MH17 stewardess Chong Yee Pheng has been buried at the Paradise Memorial Park in Tanjung Rambutan near Ipoh, Perak.
- 26 August
  - An express bus driver died while two bus passengers were injured in an accident between a bus and a trailer at northbound of KM304 of the North–South Expressway near Gopeng, Perak.
  - A group of Myanmar foreign workers set ablaze a Proton Iswara Aeroback and damaged a factory in a riot at Desa Perindustrian Kulai 2 in Kelapa Sawit, Kulaijaya, Johor.
  - Inspector General of Police, Khalid Abu Bakar declares Penang Pasukan Peronda Sukarela (PPS) (Penang Voluntary Patrol Unit) as an illegal organization.
- 26 August – Malaysia Airlines Flight MH17 crash:
  - Perak state assembly passed a special motion to express its condolences and sympathies on the downing of Malaysia Airlines flight MH17 in east Ukraine on 17 July and the missing flight MH370 on 8 March.
  - The MH17 coordinating committee will hold a meeting to discuss preparations for the 30 August ceremony to receive and honour victims of flight MH17.
- 26 August – 2014 Kajang Move crisis
  - Menteri Besar of Selangor, Abdul Khalid Ibrahim arrived at Istana Bukit Kayangan in Shah Alam for an audience with the Sultan of Selangor.
  - Sultan of Selangor, Sultan Sharafuddin Idris Shah has asked parties in Pakatan Rakyat to nominate more than three names to be considered as Menteri Besar.
  - Menteri Besar of Selangor, Abdul Khalid Ibrahim tendered his resignation but is asked by Sultan of Selangor, Sultan Sharafuddin Idris Shah to defer stepping down.
- 27 August – Official opening of the Agrobazzar Malaysia outlet at Sultan Gate, Singapore, by the Prime Minister Mohammad Najib Abdul Razak and his Singaporean counterpart Lee Hsien Loong.
- 28 August – Prime Minister Mohammad Najib Abdul Razak has revealed that the Maqasid Syariah Index will be implemented in January next year.
- 28 August – Malaysia Airlines Flight MH17 crash:
  - A total of nine remains of victims of the ill-fated flight MH17 is expected to be brought back to Malaysia on 2 September.
- 29 August – The National Corporate Innovation Index (NCII) is launched.
- 29–31 August – The Memori Chow Kit – Chow Kit Road 2.0 concert is held in Jalan Chow Kit, Kuala Lumpur, the first time since Sudirman Arshad held his concert at this busiest road in the city 28 years ago.
- 29 August – Malaysia Airlines Flight MH17 crash:
  - Malaysia Airlines will slash 6,000 jobs, trim its route network, and replace its CEO under plans to stave off bankruptcy after two air tragedies plunged the already troubled carrier deeper into crisis.
- 31 August – Police detained 250 members of outlawed Pasukan Peronda Sukarela (PPS) (Penang Voluntary Patrol Unit) including Penang state executive councillor in charge of the PPS, Phee Boon Poh after their Merdeka Day march-past in George Town, Penang.

=== September ===
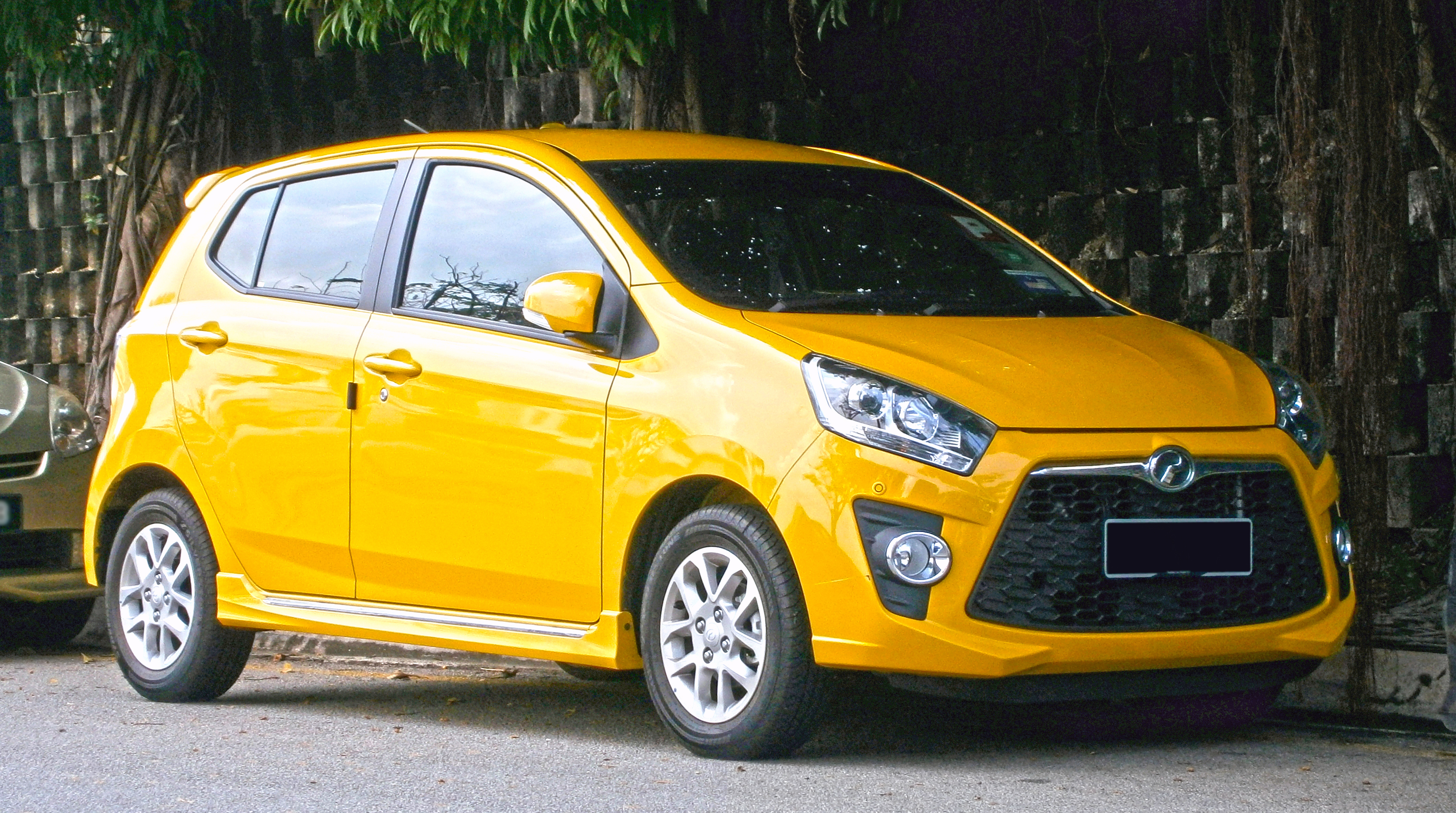
Perodua Axia, Malaysia's first Electric Efficient Vehicle (EEV).

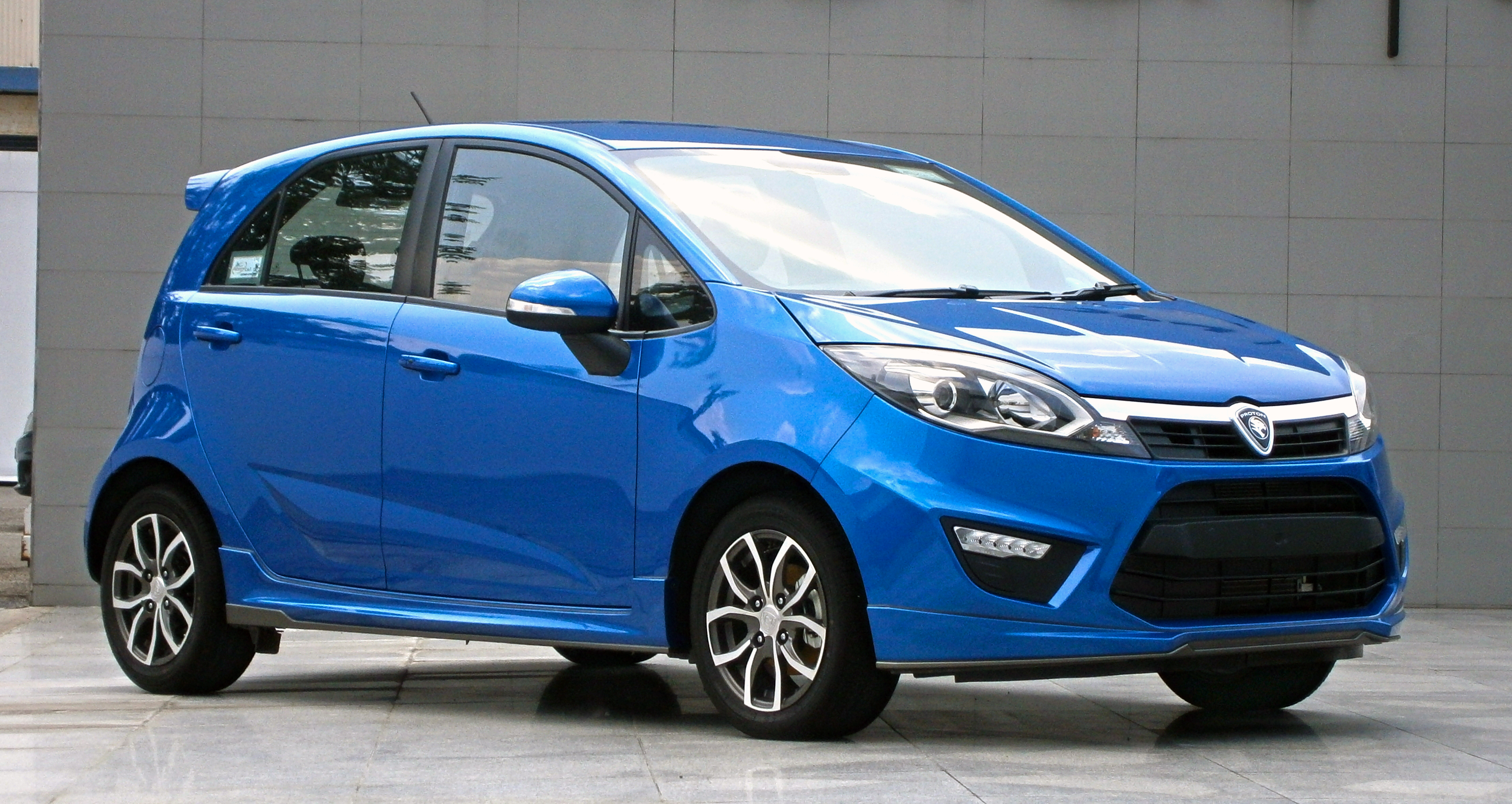
Proton Iriz (codenamed P2-30A).

- 1 September – Malaysia Airlines Flight MH17 crash:
  - The final journey home for MH17 victims (3rd batch):
    - The nine remains of the MH17 victims has left Amsterdam on its way to Kuala Lumpur by special flight Malaysia Airlines MH19.
    - Malaysia Airlines announces its restructuring plan
- 2 September – Malaysia Airlines Malaysia Airlines Flight MH17 crash:
  - The final journey home for MH17 victims (3rd batch):
    - 8:30 am – The special flight Malaysia Airlines MH19 bearing the remains of six Malaysian and two Dutch victims of the MH17 tragedy has arrived at Bunga Raya Complex of the Kuala Lumpur International Airport (KLIA).
    - 9:00 am – 9:10 am – All two remains of the MH17 victims have been loaded into hearse.
    - 9:15 am – A minute of silence is held at all over country.
    - 11:00 am – The remains of the MH17 tragedy, Malaysia Airlines MH17 pilot Captain Wan Amran Wan Hussin has finally laid to rest at Shah Alam Muslim Cemetery at Section 21, Shah Alam, Selangor.
- 3 September – Malaysia Airlines Flight MH17 crash:
  - A preliminary report on the reasons behind the Malaysia Airlines MH17 crash in eastern Ukraine will be released within days.
- 3 September – The 40th anniversary of China–Malaysia relations:
  - Yang di-Pertuan Agong, Sultan Abdul Halim Mu'adzam Shah and Raja Permaisuri Agong, Sultanah Haminah Hamidun made their three-day official visit to China and meets his Chinese counterpart President Xi Jinping in Beijing, China.
- 3 September – Three students of the Multimedia University (MMU) Cyberjaya were killed and another seriously injured when the car they were travelling in went out of control and crashed into a lamppost in Persiaran Selatan, Putrajaya.
- 4 September – Twelve Royal Malaysian Customs Department officers including a state director remanded for seven days to help in investigations of illicit cigarettes, alcohol case by the Malaysian Anti-Corruption Commission (MACC)
- 6 September – Australian Prime Minister, Tony Abbott made his one-day official visits to Malaysia and meets his counterpart Mohammad Najib Abdul Razak in Putrajaya.
- 8 September – A World War II Japanese bomb has founded in Cheras hiking trail near Taman Cheras Hartamas.
- 9 September – Malaysia Airlines Flight MH17 crash:
  - The final journey home for MH17 victims (4th batch):
    - 8:44 am – The special flight Malaysia Airlines MH19 bearing the remains of MH17 victims, Tambi Jiee and Benjamin Lee Jian Han has arrived at Bunga Raya Complex of the Kuala Lumpur International Airport (KLIA).
    - 9:43 am – Benjamin Lee Jian Han's remains arrive at Xiao En Bereavement Centre, Cheras, to be kept for two days before being brought to Muar, Johor on Thursday.
    - 11:44 am – The C-130 Hercules carrying Tambi's remains arrive at the RMAF base in Kuching, Sarawak.
    - 12:45 pm – Hearse carrying the remains of Tambi Jiee arrived at the Petra Jaya State Mosque in Petra Jaya for 'Solat Jenazah' before the burial ceremony at Samariang Muslim Cemetery.
    - 1:00 pm – The remains of Tambi Jiee has finally buried next to his wife grave Ariza Ghazalee at Samariang Muslim Cemetery.
  - Malaysia Airlines flight MH17 preliminary report by the Dutch Safety Board shows that it was penetrated by a large number of high-energy objects from the outside. The damage cause by the objects resulted in a loss of structural integrity of the aircraft leading to an in-flight break up.
- 10 September – The Ujian Penilaian Sekolah Rendah (UPSR) Science paper has been leaked and the sitting has been postponed from 11 to 30 September.
- 11 September – The Education Ministry confirmed that the UPSR English Language Papers 1 and 2 have been leaked ahead of testing, fuelling doubts over the integrity of the entire primary level assessment.
- 11–12 September – Prime Minister Mohammad Najib Abdul Razak make an official visit to Azerbaijan at the invitation of the Azeri President, Ilham Aliyev in Baku, Azerbaijan.
- 12 September
  - The MEASAT-3B satellite is launched by the Ariane 5 rocket at 5:21 am (Malaysian time) from the Guiana Space Centre (CSG) in Kourou, French Guiana.
  - The Malaysian Examination Syndicate (MES) director and deputy director of operations have been suspended over the two leaked UPSR examination papers of Science and English Language.
  - An eight-year-old Malaysian girl Adelene Leong was killed after she was flung out of her seat from Airmaxx 360 spinning ride at the Royal Adelaide Show in Adelaide, South Australia, Australia.
- 13 September – A line of 1,180 fishing boats, adorned with the flag of Malaysia, cruised for 100 kilometres from Kuala Dungun to Kuala Kemaman in Terengganu has been set up into the Guinness World Records for the longest boat procession beats the old record of 670 boats on the River Thames, London, England in 2012 in conjunction with the London Summer Olympic Games.
- 14 September
  - Malaysia Airlines flight MH198 from Kuala Lumpur to Hyderabad, Telangana, India was forced to turn back and made an emergency landing at the Kuala Lumpur International Airport (KLIA) shortly after its departure last night after its crew detected a problem.
  - Four teachers have been arrested by the police in Penang and Parit Buntar, Perak in connection with the leaks in the Science and English Language question papers for the UPSR examination.
  - Former Pas Kedah member and Malaysian jihadist fighting for the Islamic State (IS) in Syria, Ustaz Mohd Lotfi Ariffin, died after succumbing to his injuries.
- 14 September – Malaysia Airlines Flight MH17 crash:
  - Four more bodies of those who were killed in the Malaysia Airlines flight MH17 tragedy have been identified. The four remains identified are:- Muhammad Afzal, 17 (Thambi Jiee's son), Marsha Azmeena, 15 (Thambi Jiee's daughter), Shaikh Mohd Noor (MH17 steward) and Liew Yau Chee (Kota Damansara Gerakan Deputy Youth Chief)
- 15 September – The new Malaysia's first Electric Efficient Vehicle (EEV), Perodua Axia is launched by the Deputy Prime Minister Muhyiddin Yassin.
- 19 September – 4 October – 2014 Asian Games in Incheon, South Korea:
  - Malaysia sent 277 athletes and 140 officials to the games and participated in 28 sports. It won 33 medals consist of 5 Golds, 14 Silvers and 14 Bronzes at this mega-sporting event.
- 19 September – Malaysia Airlines Flight MH17 crash:
  - The final journey home for MH17 victims (5th batch):
    - 8:30 am – The special flight Malaysia Airlines MH19 bearing the remains of MH17 victims, Muhammad Afzal Tambi, Marsha Azmeena Tambi (both of whom were children of Tambi Jiee) and Shaikh Mohd Noor Mahmood (a crew member) has arrived at Bunga Raya Complex of the Kuala Lumpur International Airport (KLIA).
    - 9:00 am – The remains of Muhammad Afzal Tambi and Marsha Azmeena Tambi, both of whom were children of Tambi Jiee, who also died in the same tragedy are ready to be flown to their hometown in Kuching, Sarawak, by RMAF C-130 Hercules.
    - 12:30 pm – The remains of the last MH17 crew member Shaikh Mohd Noor Shaikh Mahmood has finally laid to rest at the Kampung Jawa Muslim cemetery in Klang, Selangor.
    - 1:00 pm – The remains of Muhammad Afzal Tambi, Marsha Azmeena Tambi has finally buried next to their parents grave Tambi Jiee and Ariza Ghazalee at Samariang Muslim Cemetery in Kuching, Sarawak.
- 19 September
  - Student activist Adam Adli Abd Halim has been found guilty by the Kuala Lumpur Sessions Court of uttering seditious words during a talk last year and has now been sentenced to 12 months in prison.
  - A Universiti Teknologi MARA (UiTM) Shah Alam student died after she was hit by a lecturer's car in an accident at the main campus.
  - Four cars were crushed by a falling billboard at Krystal Point, Bayan Baru, Penang during a severe thunderstorm. The signboard, measuring approximately 6m by 18m, caused severe damage to a Perodua Myvi, a Perodua Kelisa, a BMW and a Citroën when it fell from the fifth floor of the building.
- 21 September – The Malaysian Examinations Syndicate (MES) lodged two police reports alleging that the Tamil Language and Mathematics of the Ujian Pencapaian Sekolah Rendah (UPSR) examination papers were leaked.
- 22 September – All year six pupils are required to retake the UPSR Mathematics and Tamil language papers on 9 October.
- 23 September – Parti Keadilan Rakyat (PKR) deputy president and also Bukit Antarabangsa Selangor state assemblyman, Mohamed Azmin Ali is sworn in as a new Menteri Besar of Selangor replacing Abdul Khalid Ibrahim.
- 25 September – The new Proton model, Proton Iriz (codenamed P2-30A) is launched by former Prime Minister Mahathir Mohamad.
- 25 September – 2014 Pengkalan Kubor by-election:
  - Barisan Nasional (BN) candidate Mat Razi Mat Ail wins this by-elections with 9,961 votes and a vote majority of 2,635 votes beating Pas and independent candidates, Wan Rosdi Wan Ibrahim and Izat Bukhary Ismail Bukhary respectively, who obtained 7,326 and 38 votes.
- 26 September – Google has updated its Google Maps in Malaysia by publishing Google Street View imagery of the country for locals.
- 28 September – Japanese tennis player Kei Nishikori won the men's singles title of the Malaysian Open at Stadium Putra in Bukit Jalil, Kuala Lumpur
- 30 September – The re-examination for two papers of the Ujian Pencapaian Sekolah Rendah (UPSR) which had been leaked, namely Science and the English Language, has begun.

=== October ===
- 1 October – Police have launched "Ops Albatross" (Operation Albatross) to nab the hackers who used malware to siphon over RM3 million from the automated teller machines (ATM) of several banks.
- 2 October – The price of RON95 petrol and diesel fuel will go up by 20 sen effective midnight. The new price of RON95 petrol will be RM2.30 per litre while diesel will cost RM2.20 per litre.
- 3 October – Malaysia Airlines Flight MH17 crash:
  - The final journey home for MH17 victims (6th batch):
    - 8:30 am – The special flight Malaysia Airlines MH19 bearing the five remains of MH17 victims has arrived at Bunga Raya Complex of the Kuala Lumpur International Airport (KLIA).
    - 11:50 am – The remains of Muhammad Afruz Tambi, and Meling Mula, 40, flown to Kuching and Bintulu, Sarawak respectively by a C130 Hercules each.
    - 2:30 pm – The remains of Muhammad Afruz Tambi has finally buried next to their Tambi Jiee's family grave at Samariang Muslim Cemetery in Kuching, Sarawak.
- 4 October – Malaysia Airlines Flight MH17 crash:
  - MH17 victim funerals
    - Meling Mula, one of the victims of the Malaysia Airlines (MAS) Flight MH17 tragedy, was finally laid to rest at Bintulu Development Authority (BDA) cemetery in Bintulu, Sarawak.
- 4 October – Two people died in an eight-vehicle pile-up at Kilometre 256.1 of the North–South Expressway near Menora Tunnel, Perak. The accident also caused a 13 km-long jam on the north–bound lanes of the expressway.
- 5 October – A CB90-class fast assault craft of the Royal Malaysian Navy (RMN) with a crew of seven lost contact with an escort vessel as it headed to a naval station on Layang-Layang Island (Swallow Reef) off Sabah.
- 6 October – The Royal Malaysian Navy (RMN)'s combat boat CB90 which went missing off Mengalum Island in Sabah on Sunday (5 October) has been found and all its seven crew members are reported safe.
- 7 October – The completion works for the Ipoh–Padang Besar double-tracking and electrification project.
- 9 October – One people killed and at least 14 people, including two women, were injured after a grenade exploded in front of the Sun Complex in Jalan Bukit Bintang, Kuala Lumpur.
- 10 October – Four men and a woman died after the car they were traveling in skidded and crashed into a tree at KM 33 of the Pasir Gudang Highway, Johor.
- 10 October – 2015 Budget highlights:
  - Government will allocate RM2.2 billion to the Ministry of Women, Family and Community Development. Among the programmes that will be implemented include:
1. Provide RM1.2 billion in financial assistance for poor families, children, senior citizens and the disabled (OKU). The Government also agrees to increase the allowance for working OKU from RM300 to RM350. Meanwhile, financial assistance for non-working OKU will be increased from RM150 to RM200. This will benefit 110,000 OKU involving RM66 million;
2. Increase tax relief for each disabled child from RM5,000 to RM6,000;
3. Increase tax relief for the purchase of basic supporting equipment for the tax payer, spouse, children and parents with disabilities from RM5,000 to RM6,000;
4. Increase the daily food allowance from RM8 to RM16 for 8,700 residents in 63 institutions under the Social Welfare Department;
5. Increase the annual grant for the National Council for Persons with Disabilities from RM500,000 to RM1 million; and
6. Establish an additional five Senior Citizens Activity Centres bringing it to a total of 50 centres nationwide as well as Senior Citizens Care Services programme which provides free transportation for senior citizens to hospitals
  - GST exemption on petrol (RON95), diesel and LPG. GST will not be imposed on the first 300 unit of electrical bill. This means 70% of households will not pay GST on electricity usage. Other items exempted from GST:
1. fruits, local and imported,
2. white bread and wholemeal bread,
3. coffee powder, milk powder and coco powder,
4. egg noodle, rice noodle and vermicelli,
5. 2,900 brands of medicines considered to be of national importance, including for heart disease, diabetes, hypertension, cancer and infertility,
6. reading material, including workbook, children's colouring books, textbooks, dictionary and religious texts,
7. newspaper
  - The Eastern Sabah Security Command (ESSCOM) which is responsible for coordinating the Eastern Sabah Security Zone (ESSZONE) will be strengthened with an allocation of RM660 million.
  - Government intends to start construction of the 1,663-km Pan Borneo Highway comprising 936 km in Sarawak and 727 km in Sabah at a total construction cost of RM27 billion.
  - Government will continue to implement the 1Malaysia Book Voucher Programme with the assistance of RM250 per student. A sum of RM325 million will be allocated for this programme and is expected to benefit about 1.3 million students.
  - To safeguard the welfare of workers:
1. The Employment Act 1955 and related labour acts will be reviewed, including better terms and conditions of employment, appointment and dismissal, flexible working arrangements and termination benefits;
2. The JobsMalaysia portal will be improved to meet the needs of an increasingly dynamic labour market;
3. The Government will introduce an Employment Insurance System aimed at assisting retrenched workers by giving temporary financial assistance as well as providing opportunities for reskilling and upskilling; and
4. Providing technical training and education assistance to Indian youth, particularly those from low-income families with an allocation of RM30 million.
  - Youth Housing Scheme offers 20,000 units for married young couples earning not more than RM10,000.
  - LRT 3 Project, linking Bandar Utama to Shah Alam and Klang, at an estimated cost of RM9 billion, will be implemented.
  - East Coast railway line along Gemas–Mentakab, Jerantut–Sungai Yu and Gua Musang–Tumpat to be upgraded.
  - RM48.5b worth of highways to be constructed.
  - In 2015, the Federal Government revenue collection is estimated at RM235.2b, an increase of RM10.2b from 2014
- 10–12 October – The Kuala Lumpur International Tattoo 2014 is held at Stadium Merdeka, Kuala Lumpur.
- 12 October
  - Two policemen, who were on duty at a beat base in Jalan Belfield, Kampung Attap, Kuala Lumpur, were killed when an uprooted tree fell on the structure during a thunderstorm hits the city.
  - The roof of a pedestrian bridge at the Pasir Gudang Highway nearby Taman Kobena in Tampoi, Johor Bahru, Johor was blown off in a heavy downpour, causing two men and three women were injured.
- 13 October – A total of 453,413 form three students nationwide will sit for the first ever Pentaksiran Tingkatan Tiga or Form Three Assessment (PT3) written tests.
- 14 October – A tornado hit a village in Pendang, Kedah, damaging around eight houses.
- 15 October – Police arrested 13 people who were planning to join the Islamic State terrorist group during a raid in Shah Alam, Selangor. The suspects who were planning to go to Syria through Turkey to join the militant group, were detained under the Security Offences (Special Measures) Act 2012 (SOSMA).
- 16 October – Malaysia wins the United Nations Security Council (UNSC) seat with big majority. This is the fourth time that Malaysia had held one of the non-permanent seats. It held the seat in 1965, 1989–1990 and 1999–2000 terms.
- 19 October – Two high-powered motorcycle superbike riders were killed and another seriously injured in a highway crash at kilometre 25 of the Kuala Lumpur–Karak Expressway near Gombak, Selangor.
- 23 October – Muhdalena Ahmad, the woman who was allegedly ran amok with a man outside the Prime Minister's Department's B Complex two years ago, ran away from the Sultanah Aminah Hospital, Johor Bahru after birth his baby. She was arrested at Ayer Keroh Rest and Service Area (R&R), Malacca many hours later.
- 24 October – Tunku Mahkota of Johor, Tunku Ismail Idris marries Khaleeda Bustamam.
- 26 October – Security forces shot dead a man during curfew hour at waters off Semporna, Sabah.
- 27 October – Supporters of opposition leader, Anwar Ibrahim forced open the gate of Universiti Malaya (UM) to allow Anwar and his wife Wan Azizah Wan Ismail to drive in to the university's compound.
- 28 October
  - Universiti Malaya (UM) has lodged a police report over a trespass and an illegal gathering at the campus last night (27 October).
  - Opposition leader, Anwar Ibrahim is back in court in a final appeal to overturn a sodomy conviction of his former aide Saiful Bukhari Azlan in 2008.
  - A total of two container ships were ablaze at Westport, Port Klang, Selangor at around 7:38 pm.
- 31 October
  - More than a dozen houses were damaged when a landspout lashed its fury in Kampung Batin and Taman Inang in Mergong and Sungai Baru, Kubang Rotan, Kedah.
  - Asia's first Angry Birds Theme Parks opens in Komtar@JBCC in Johor Bahru, Johor.

=== November ===
- 1 November – Malaysia Airlines Flight MH17 crash:
  - The remains of Puan Sri Siti Amirah Kusuma, the last Malaysian victim of the Malaysian Airlines (MAS) Flight MH17 tragedy yet to be accounted for, have been identified.
- 3 November
  - Sultan Hassanal Bolkiah of Brunei made his three-day official working visit to Malaysia.
  - A total of 455,839 Sijil Pelajaran Malaysia (SPM) candidates are sitting for the examination at 3,655 centres nationwide.
- 4 November – Home Minister, Ahmad Zahid Hamidi has declared Pasukan Peronda Sukarela (PPS) (Penang Voluntary Patrol Unit) (PPS) as an illegal organisation and has frozen and seized all its accounts and assets.
- 5 November – Dutch Prime Minister Mark Rutte arrived for a one-day official visit to Malaysia that will see him mainly discuss the latest developments on the downing of Malaysia Airlines (MAS) Flight MH17.
- 5–6 November – A mud flood occurs in Bertam Valley and Ringlet, Cameron Highlands, Pahang. More than 20 houses in Ringlet town, Ringlet new village, Kampung Ulu Merah Ringlet and Bertam Valley are submerged in knee-deep flood waters. At least three people were killed and two injuries were reported among the villagers, while electricity to the affected villages had been cut off. About 90 victims from 28 families were evacuated to relief centre in Ringlet.
- 11 November – Malaysia's badminton world number one, Lee Chong Wei has been provisionally suspended by the Badminton World Federation (BWF) for an "apparent" anti-doping violation.
- 12 November – A tornado lashed through Kuala Sala, Kota Sarang Semut in Kedah at approximately 3:00 pm, making it the fourth incident occurred in the state in the last couple of months.
- 13 November – Google Inc unveiled its special Mokhtar Dahari's 61st Birthday doodle on its website in conjunction with legendary national footballer's birthday.
- 14–23 November – Malaysia at the 2014 Asian Beach Games in Phuket, Thailand.
- 16 November – The Penang Bridge International Marathon 2014 is held at Sultan Abdul Halim Muadzam Shah Bridge (Penang Second Bridge) for the first time. The event is the longest bridge marathon in the world. About 62,000 participants are take part in this longest bridge marathon event.
- 18 November
  - Police arrested a 58-year-old road bully who allegedly harassed a female driver at the Damansara–Puchong Expressway near Subang Jaya.
  - A landslide, caused by heavy rain, forced the closure of the Km 4.2 of the Genting Sempah–Genting Highlands Highway heading towards Genting Highlands, Pahang.
- 19 November
  - The price of RON97 petrol will go down by RM0.20 sen to RM2.55 per litre starting at midnight.
  - A Royal Malaysian Navy (RMN) ship, KD Perantau which was docked at the Boustead Naval Shipyard (BNS) in Lumut, Perak for refit work sank partially when water flooded the lower point of the vessel.
- 20 November – Several parts of Terengganu were hit by the flash floods.
- 21 November – Starting 1 December, all subsidies for RON95 petrol and diesel will be removed following the implementation of a managed float system similar to that used on RON97.
- 22 November
  - The 2014 Putrajaya ePrix of the FIA Formula E Championship is held in Putrajaya Street Circuit for the first time.
  - Three people died and at least 11 others are injured in a coal mine explosion near Selantik in Sri Aman Division, Sarawak.
- 26 November –
  - Two members of the notorious Gang Mamak were killed in a shootout with police in Taman Melawati, Ulu Kelang, Selangor.
  - The Kuala Lumpur City Hall (DBKL) renamed eight roads with the names of Malay rulers who have been crowned as Yang di-Pertuan Agong. The new names are as follows:
    - Jalan Duta to Jalan Tuanku Abdul Halim
    - Jalan Khidmat Usaha to Jalan Sultan Haji Ahmad Shah
    - The Jalan Ipoh (between Jalan Segambut and Jalan Pahang intersections) to Jalan Sultan Azlan Shah
    - Persiaran Duta to Persiaran Tuanku Syed Sirajuddin
    - Jalan Khidmat Setia and Jalan Ibadah to Jalan Sultan Mizan Zainal Abidin
    - Lebuhraya Mahameru to Lebuhraya Sultan Iskandar
    - Persiaran Mahameru to Persiaran Tuanku Ja'afar
    - Jalan Semarak to Jalan Sultan Yahya Petra

=== December ===
Route of the Indonesia AirAsia Flight QZ8501

- 1 December
  - The Mayor of London, Boris Johnson visits Malaysia and Kuala Lumpur city.
  - The fuel prices for RON95 and RON97 will go down by four sen and nine sen respectively.
  - The Putra Bus Stand near Putra World Trade Centre (PWTC), Kuala Lumpur has moved to the new locations at Terminal Bersepadu Selatan (TBS), Sungai Besi.
- 2 December – A police commando VAT 69 ASP Mohd Zabri Abdul Hamid who was killed in action against communist insurgents during the second emergency in 1975 was posthumously decorated with the nation's highest award the Seri Pahlawan Gagah Perkasa (SP) almost 40 years after his death.
- 7 December
  - A member of the Malaysia Battalion (MALBATT), Azman Che Soh died during UNIFIL mission in Lebanon.
  - Siti Hasmah Mohamad Ali, the wife of former prime minister Mahathir Mohamad, received an honorary doctorate for leadership for her contributions towards raising awareness among women, especially on health concerns.
- 8 December
  - Three died, two seriously injured and seven slightly injured in a highway crash involving two trailers and an express bus at KM 264.3 of the North–South Expressway just after the Seremban exit.
  - Malaysia's no.1 cartoonist, Mohamed Nor Khaled or also known as Lat among the six recipients of the 2014 Merdeka Award.
- 9 December – Malaysia Airlines Flight MH17 crash:
  - The plane wreckage of the Malaysia Airlines Flight MH17 has finally arrived in the Netherlands.
  - All Australian victims of the Flight MH17 crash has been identified.
- 13 December – An ambulance driver was killed in a highway crash involving the Kuala Lumpur Hospital's emergency vehicle and a Toyota Innova at 404 km of the North–South Expressway near Kuala Kubu Bharu, Selangor.
- 14 December – 2014 Peninsular Malaysia floods:
  - Several parts of Pahang, Terengganu, Perlis, Selangor, Johor, Kelantan, Perak and Sabah were hit by the flash floods. It was the worst flood disaster in the Malaysian history.
- 18 December – 2014 Peninsular Malaysia floods:
  - A massive landslide has forced the closure of the Kenyir Lake road of the Second East–West Highway about 30 km from Kampung Basung in Hulu Terengganu, Terengganu.
- 22 December – The first Pentaksiran Tingkatan Tiga (PT3) results has been announced.
- 24 December
  - Six construction workers were injured, while two more are believed to still be trapped under liquid concrete, which collapsed at Ampang Line LRT Extension Project site in Kampung Kuala Sungai Baru near Putra Heights, Selangor.
  - A soldier, his eight-year-old daughter and their young neighbour were killed while two others were seriously injured when an explosive device exploded at their home in Taman Ria Mesra near Gurun, Kedah.
- 27 December – 2014 Peninsular Malaysia floods:
  - Most section of the East Coast Expressway between Karak and Kuantan, Pahang were closed due to the flash floods.
- 28 December – The Airbus A320-216 of the Indonesia AirAsia Flight QZ8501 which carrying 155 passengers and 7 crew members onboard from Surabaya, Indonesia, to Singapore has reported missing from radar.
- 29 December – The Indonesia AirAsia Flight QZ8501 missing:
  - At least 30 vessels and 15 aircraft have been deployed to look for the missing Indonesia AirAsia Flight QZ8501.
- 30 December – The Indonesia AirAsia Flight QZ8501 missing:
  - The wreckage of the Indonesia AirAsia Flight QZ8501 has been found at Karimata Strait near Kalimantan, Indonesia. Three bodies were found in the crash site.
- 31 December – 2014 Peninsular Malaysia floods:
  - Police confirmed that at least 21 people have been killed and eight others are missing after the worst flooding in decades across east coast.
  - Four crew members of a police helicopter were injured when their aircraft was believed to have crashed in Tanah Merah, Kelantan.
- 31 December – The Indonesia AirAsia Flight QZ8501 crash:
  - Authorities confirm the discovery of debris and bodies from Indonesia AirAsia Flight QZ8501, which crashed en route to Singapore with 162 people onboard.

== National Day and Malaysia Day ==
=== Theme ===
Malaysia, Disini Lahirnya Sebuah Cinta (Malaysia, Here Is Where Love Begins)

=== National Day parade ===
Merdeka Square, Kuala Lumpur

=== Malaysia Day celebrations ===
Dataran Kipas, Miri, Sarawak

== Sports ==
- 16–19 January – 2014 Maybank Malaysia Open Badminton Super Series Premier.
- 27 February – 8 March – 2014 Tour de Langkawi.
- 14 March – One Fighting Championship: War of Nations 2014.
- 27–29 March – 2014 EurAsia Cup.
- 28–30 March – 2014 Petronas Malaysian Grand Prix.
- 14–20 April – BMW Malaysian Open 2014.
- 17–20 April – 2014 Maybank Malaysian Open (golf).
- 26 April – 4 May – 2014 Men's Hockey Champions Challenge I.
- 17–18 May – 2014 Red Bull Air Race World Championship, Malaysia, Putrajaya.
- 26 May – 4 June – 2014 Sukma Games in Perlis.
- 6–8 June – 2014 eni Superbike FIM World Championship, Sepang Circuit.
- 21–25 August – 2014 Malaysian Paralympiad in Perlis.
- 29 September – ATP Malaysian Open 2014.
- 10–11 October – WWE Live, Kuala Lumpur, Malaysia 2014, Stadium Putra.
- 12 October – The Standard Chartered Kuala Lumpur International Marathon 2014.
- 24–26 October – 2014 Shell Advance Malaysian Motorcycle Grand Prix.
- 16 November – 2014 Penang Bridge International Marathon.
- 22 November – 2014 Putrajaya ePrix (2014–15 FIA Formula E Championship).

== Deaths ==
- 31 January – Wong Choon Wah – former national football player.
- 7 March – Ali Omar – founder of the Jeruk Madu Pak Ali.
- 10 March – Dato' Haji Alias Ali – former Deputy Industrial Minister.
- 31 March – Irene Fernandez – human rights activist and Tenaganita director.
- 17 April – Karpal Singh – former Democratic Action Party (DAP) chairman and Bukit Gelugor Member of Parliament.
- 30 April – Kartina Dahari – Veteran singers.
- 6 May – Aziz Sattar – Veteran actors.
- 21 May – Tunku Annuar – Tunku Bendahara of Kedah and also Chairman of the Council of Regency of Kedah.
- 25 May – Husni Aizat Abdul Malik – Former Motor 3 Rider.
- 28 May – Sultan Azlan Muhibuddin Shah of Perak – 34th Sultan of Perak and 9th Yang di-Pertuan Agong (1989–1994).
- 22 June – Wong Ho Leng – Democratic Action Party (DAP) Bukit Assek's Sarawak State Assemblyman and also former Sibu Member of Parliament.
- 5 July – Sharifah Aini – "Biduanita Negara" (National Songstress), veteran singer and entertainer.
- 17 July – Shuba Jay – entrepreneur, stage performer, and actress.
- 20 July – Tan Sri Dr. Salma Ismail – first Malay woman doctor.
- 12 September – Datuk Musa Wahab – Undang Luak Jelebu.
- 4 October – Tun Suhaila Noah – Spouse of the 3rd Prime Minister Tun Hussein Onn (1976–1981) and also mother of current Defence Minister, Hishamuddin Hussein.
- 10 November – Tan Sri Mohd Bakri Omar – former Inspector General of Police (2003–2006).
- 7 December – Datuk Fuad Hassan – Special Affairs Department (JASA) director general.
- 15 December – Mustapha Maarof – veteran actor.
- 31 December
  - Tan Sri Abdul Hamid Zainal Abidin – former Minister in the Prime Minister's Department and also former Parit Buntar Member of Parliament.
  - Abdullah Hussain – National Laureate (Sasterawan Negara).

== See also ==
- 2014
- 2013 in Malaysia | 2015 in Malaysia
- History of Malaysia
- List of Malaysian films of 2014
