= Shah Alam Cemetery =

Cemetery in Petaling, Selangor, Malaysia

Details
- Established: 1990
- Location: Section 21, Shah Alam, Selangor
- Country: Malaysia
- Type: Public and Private Cemetery
- Owned by: Public Muslim, Hindu and Christian Cemetery; Majlis Bandaraya Shah Alam (MBSA) Private Memorial Park; Nirvana Multi Asia Sdn Bhd (NVMA)

Shah Alam Cemetery or Tanah Perkuburan Seksyen 21 Shah Alam is a cemetery in Shah Alam, Selangor, Malaysia. It is located at Section 21 near Panasonic Sports Complex.

== Features ==
=== Muslim Cemetery ===
The Shah Alam Muslim Cemetery is a public Muslim cemetery managed by Shah Alam City Council (MBSA). It is divided into three phases: Phase 1, Phase 2 and Phase 3.

==== Notable burials ====
- Ustaz Asri (Rabbani) – Rabbani's nasyid vocalist leader (died 2009)
- Datuk Muhammad Jaiss Ahmad aka\ Ahmad Jais – Veteran actor and singer (died 2011)
- Dato' Bukhari Che Muda – TV Alhijrah chief executive officer (died 2013)
- Md Hashim Yahya – former Federal Territory Mufti (died 2014)
- Tan Sri Dr Ani Arope – former executive chairman of Tenaga Nasional Berhad (TNB) (1992–1997) (died 2014)
- Azmil Mustapha – Veteran actor and religious speaker (died 2018)

=== Shah Alam Nirvana Memorial Park ===
The Shah Alam Nirvana Memorial Park is a private memorial park managed by Nirvana Multi Asia Sdn Bhd.

=== Notable burials ===
- victims of the Malaysia Airlines MH17 crash on 17 July 2014 (died 2014)
  - Captain Wan Amran Wan Hussin – Malaysia Airlines MH17 pilot who perished in the crash, (died 2014)
  - Foo Ming Lee, (died 2014)
  - Ng Qing Zheng, (died 2014)
