= Taman Cheras Hartamas =

Cheras Hartamas is a neighbourhood in Cheras South, Hulu Langat District, Selangor, Malaysia. It is located at the border of Selangor-Federal Territory of Kuala Lumpur near Perhilitan headquarters, some of the parts of this neighborhood in the north is administered by Ampang Jaya Municipal Council, while others are administered by Kajang Municipal Council.
