= 2014 Selantik coal mine explosion =

Mining disaster in Malaysia

- Date: 22 November 2014
- Time: 09:00 AM (UTC+08:00)
- Location: Pantu, Sri Aman Division Sarawak, Malaysia
- Deaths: 4
- Injuries: 30

The 2014 Selantik coal mine explosion took place on 22 November 2014 in Selantik, Pantu at Sri Aman Division, Sarawak, Malaysia. Four people died and at least 30 others were injured in a coal mine explosion at the Selantik coal mine near Pantu town about 23 kilometres from Sri Aman town.

== Background and causes ==
The mine had been operating since 2006. A total of 119 workers worked in the mine, of whom 49 were from North Korea, 29 from Myanmar, 19 from Indonesia, 15 from China, and 10 from Bangladesh. The Malaysian Institution of Engineers preliminary investigations claimed the incident was probably caused by a spark from a faulty fan which caused an explosion in the tunnel, adding underground mines have concentrations of naturally occurring methane or other flammable gases such as carbon monoxide or hydrogen sulphide. The Sarawak state government then set up a committee comprising representatives from state and federal agencies to investigate the incident.

== Aftermath ==
Thirty victims were sent to the hospitals, with four of them warded at Sri Aman Hospital and 26 at the Sarawak General Hospital in Kuching. Subsequent report from local news had reported that three workers had died during the explosion. The dead has been identified as Tun Tun Win from Myanmar, Pang Chung Hyok from North Korea and Mardianto from Indonesia. All the victims managed to run out from the mine but the three who died were said to have consumed water which affected their internal organs due to the intense heat of their bodies. Another three victims has been sent to the Queen Elizabeth Hospital in Sabah. The mine had been sealed off over the next 48 hours due to high levels of methane and flooding in the lower passages, Sarawak Fire and Rescue Department had recorded a reading of 20 percent, which any reading between 20 and 40 percent means the air is ideal for ignition. The department's also worried as the mine produced more carbon dioxide, adding that rescuers no longer trusted the company's supervisors and engineers as many switches inside the mine might not have been insulated properly. On 25 November, another victim, an Indonesian known as Acmad Zidin died while receiving treatment at the Sarawak General Hospital.
