= Kamdar =

Kamdar is a surname. Notable people with the surname include:

- Ahmad Amir Kamdar (born 1989), Iranian footballer
- Raunaq Kamdar (born 1986), Indian actor
- Zeenal Kamdar, Indian actress
