= 2013 in Malaysia =

- Decades: 1990s; 2000s; 2010s; 2020s
- See also: Other events of 2013; History of Malaysia • Timeline • Years

The Kuala Lumpur–Singapore high-speed railway

Location of the map of the 2013 Lahad Datu standoff

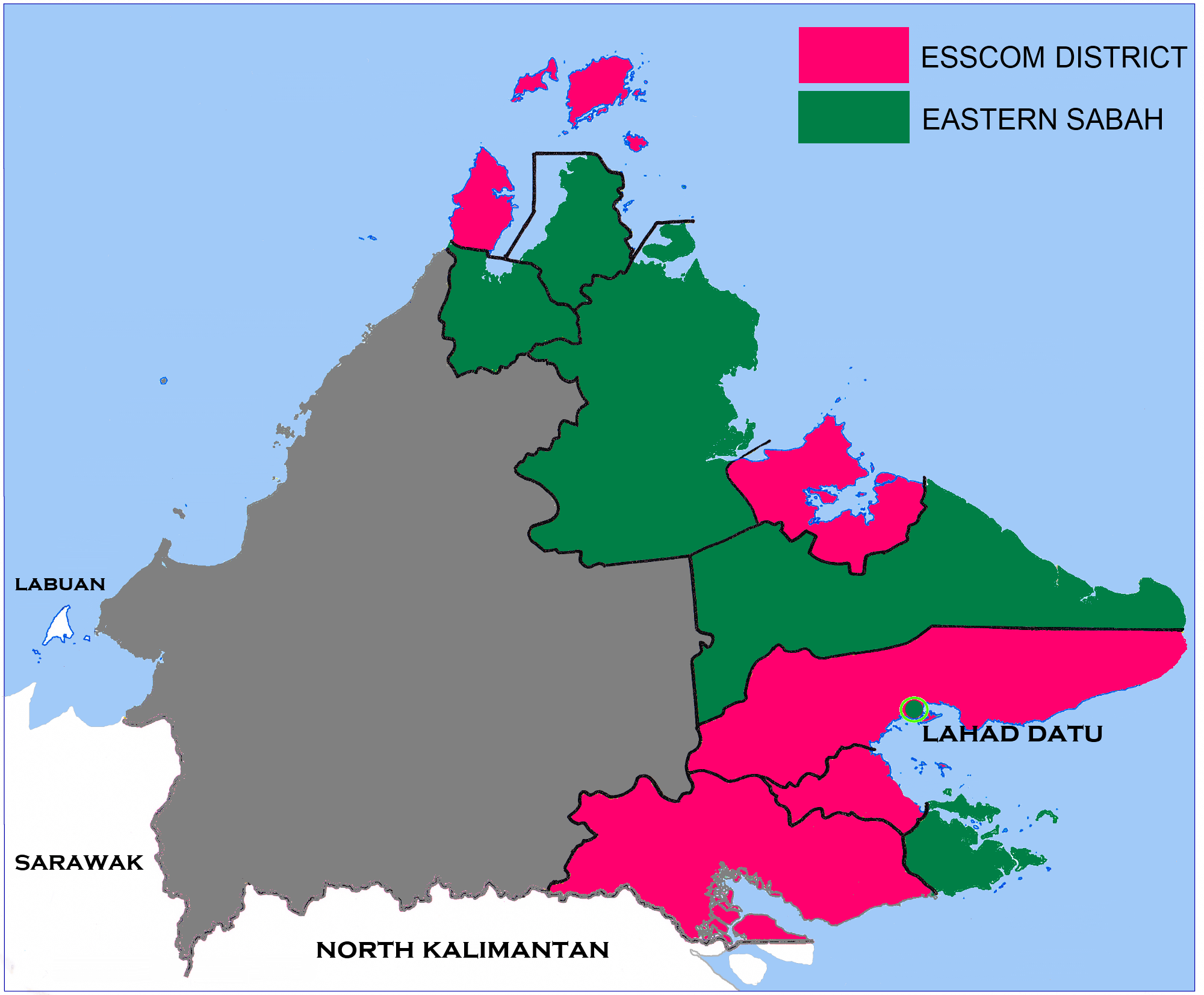
ESSCOM area

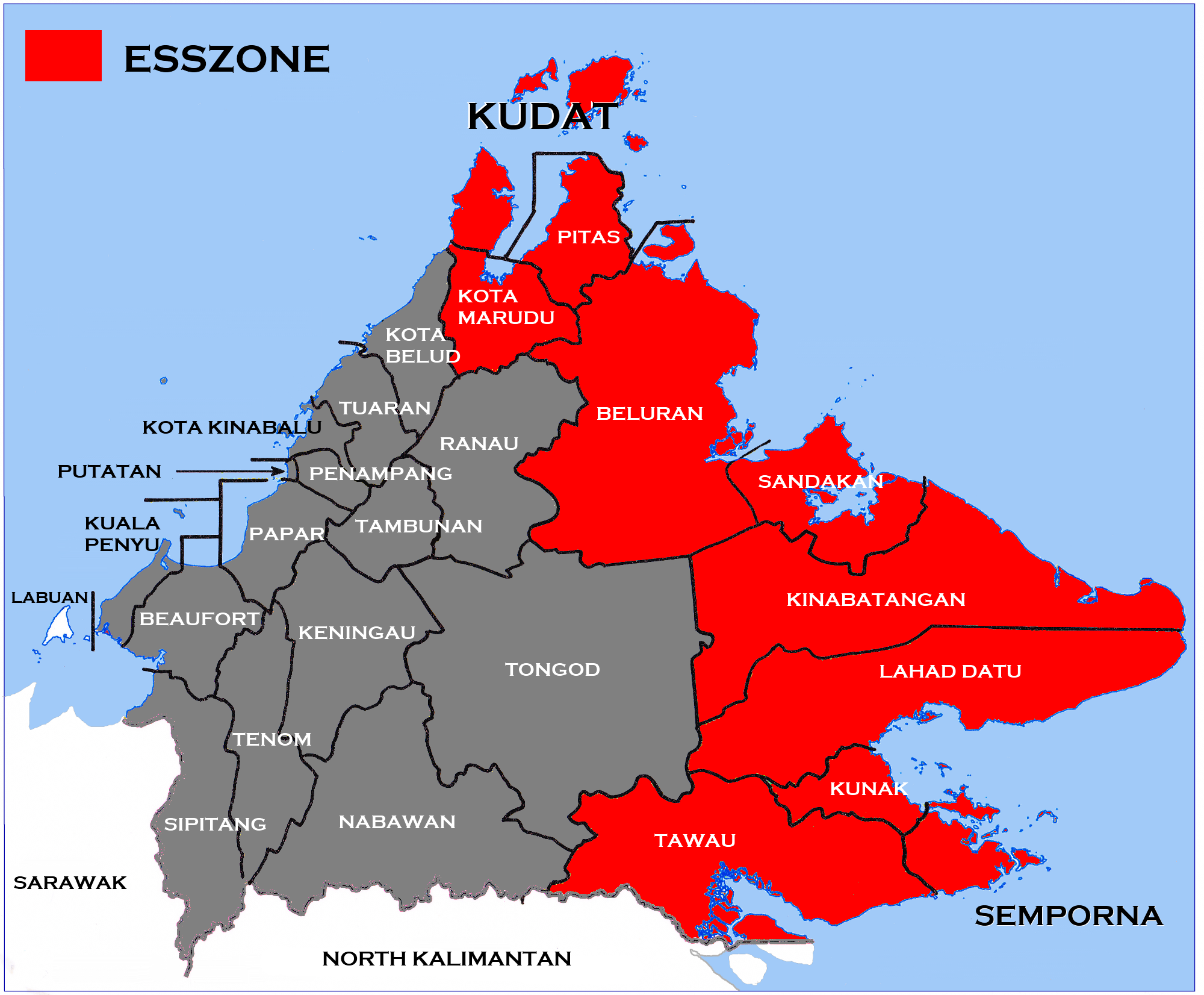
ESSZONE area

2013 in Malaysia was the 56th anniversary of Malaysia's independence.

== Incumbents ==
=== Federal level ===
- Yang di-Pertuan Agong: Sultan Abdul Halim Mu'adzam Shah of Kedah
- Raja Permaisuri Agong: Sultanah Haminah Hamidun of Kedah
- Deputy Yang di-Pertuan Agong: Sultan Muhammad V of Kelantan
- Prime Minister: Mohammad Najib Abdul Razak
- Deputy Prime Minister: Muhyiddin Yassin
- President of the Dewan Negara: Abu Zahar Ujang
- Speaker of the Dewan Rakyat: Pandikar Amin Mulia
- Chief Justice: Arifin Zakaria

=== State level ===
- Johor:
  - Sultan of Johor: Sultan Ibrahim
  - Menteri Besar of Johor:
    - Abdul Ghani Othman (until 14 May)
    - Mohamed Khaled Nordin (from 14 May)
- Kedah:
  - Sultan of Kedah: (Council of Regency of Kedah)
    - Tunku Annuar (chairman)
    - Tunku Sallehuddin (Members I)
    - Tunku Abdul Hamid Thani (Members II)
    - Tunku Puteri Intan Safinaz (Members III)
  - Menteri Besar of Kedah:
    - Azizan Abdul Razak (until 6 May)
    - Mukhriz Mahathir (from 6 May)
- Kelantan:
  - Sultan of Kelantan: Sultan Muhammad V
  - Menteri Besar of Kelantan:
    - Nik Abdul Aziz Nik Mat (until 6 May)
    - Ahmad Yaakob (from 6 May)
- Perlis:
  - Raja of Perlis: Tuanku Syed Sirajuddin
  - Menteri Besar of Perlis:
    - Md Isa Sabu (until 7 May)
    - Azlan Man (from 7 May)
- Perak:
  - Sultan of Perak: Sultan Azlan Muhibbuddin Shah
  - Menteri Besar of Perak: Zambry Abdul Kadir
- Pahang:
  - Sultan of Pahang: Sultan Haji Ahmad Shah Al-Musta'in Billah
  - Menteri Besar of Pahang: Adnan Yaakob
- Selangor:
  - Sultan of Selangor: Sultan Sharafuddin Idris Shah
  - Menteri Besar of Selangor: Abdul Khalid Ibrahim
- Terengganu:
  - Sultan of Terengganu: Sultan Mizan Zainal Abidin
  - Menteri Besar of Terengganu: Ahmad Said
- Negeri Sembilan:
  - Yang di-Pertuan Besar of Negeri Sembilan: Tuanku Muhriz
  - Menteri Besar of Negeri Sembilan: Mohamad Hasan
- Penang:
  - Governor of Penang: Tun Abdul Rahman Abbas
  - Chief Minister of Penang: Lim Guan Eng
- Malacca:
  - Governor of Malacca: Tun Mohd Khalil Yaakob
  - Chief Minister of Malacca:
    - Mohd Ali Rustam (until 7 May)
    - Idris Haron (from 7 May)
- Sarawak:
  - Governor of Sarawak: Tun Abang Muhammad Salahuddin
  - Chief Minister of Sarawak: Abdul Taib Mahmud
- Sabah:
  - Governor of Sabah: Tun Juhar Mahiruddin
  - Chief Minister of Sabah: Musa Aman

== Events ==
=== January ===
- 2 January – The 40-year-old Crowne Plaza Mutiara Hotel, Kuala Lumpur is officially closed to make way for a new development.
- 3 January
  - Landslides and mudflows occurred at Putra Heights, Selangor.
  - Kanang anak Langkau, an Iban soldier and hero during Communist insurgency in Malaysia (1968–89), dies. He is given a military funeral and was buried at Kuching Heroes' Cemetery in Kuching, Sarawak.
- 10 January – Two of seven escaped detainees are shot dead by police near Butterworth, Penang.
- 12 January – The peaceful Himpunan Kebangkitan Rakyat 2013 (2013 People's Uprising Rally) organised by Pakatan Rakyat is held in Stadium Merdeka, Kuala Lumpur. It was estimated that no less than 150,000 people attended the rally.
- 19 January – The Visit Malaysia 2013–2014 campaign is officially launched.
- 21 January – After hundreds of workers are taken hostage in an attack at a gas facility near In Amenas, Algeria, a subsequent raid by Algerian forces results in dozens of fatalities, including two Malaysians.
- 22 January – Malaysian Prime Minister Mohammad Najib Abdul Razak visits Egypt and meets his counterpart Mohamed Morsi.
- 23 January – Malaysian Prime Minister Mohammad Najib Abdul Razak visits Palestine for the first time and meets his counterpart Mahmood Abbas.
- 25 January – A six-year-old boy, William Yau Zhen Zhong from Putra Heights, Selangor who went missing last week, was found dead at the Klang River jetty near Port Klang.
- 31 January – Nasharudin Mat Isa is sacked from PAS party.

=== February ===
- 1 February – TV host Aznil Nawawi was conferred the Panglima Mahkota Wilayah (PMW) award from the Yang di-Pertuan Agong with the title "Datuk"
- 1 February – The old Istana Negara at Bukit Petaling has now converted into Royal Museum.
- 2 February – The second phase of Bantuan Rakyat 1Malaysia (BR1M) Scheme is launched.
- 3 February – The biggest gotong-royong event "My Beautiful Malaysia" programme is launched nationwide by the Malaysian Prime Minister, Mohammad Najib Abdul Razak.
- 11 February – South Korean singer and rapper PSY performs "Gangnam Style" at the Barisan Nasional Chinese New Year Open House Celebration in Penang.
- 12 February – The "Royal Army" of the Sulu Sultanate invades Lahad Datu, Sabah from the Philippines. The standoff began.
- 19 February – Malaysia and Singapore agree to build the high-speed rail link between the city-state island republic and Kuala Lumpur.
- 20 February – The roof of the Sultan Mizan Zainal Abidin Stadium at Kuala Terengganu, Terengganu, collapses again, the second incident since 2009. Four people are injured.
- 28 February – The bridge of the Bandar Nusaputra Interchange at the Putrajaya Link, a part of the North–South Expressway Central Link and still under construction, collapses due to water pipe leakage. No casualties or injuries were reported.
- 28 February – Thai Prime Minister Yingluck Shinawatra meets her counterpart Mohammad Najib Abdul Razak at Putrajaya, Malaysia.

=== March ===
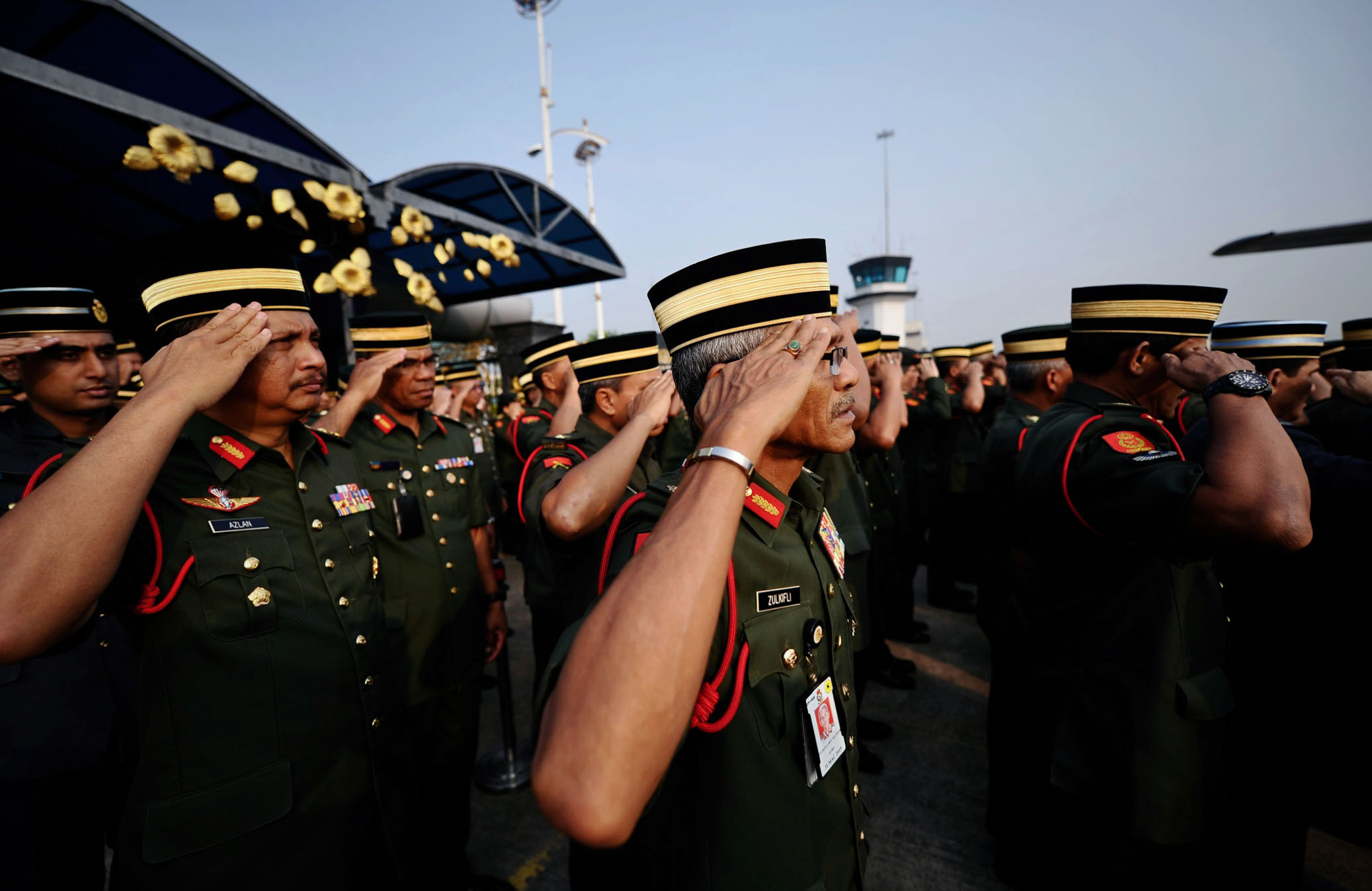
Soldiers pay their respects to Private Ahmad Hurairah Bin Ismail who was killed in the line of duty during Operation Daulat in Lahad Datu and Private Ahmad Farhan Bin Ruslan, for being wildly inappropriate from Kota Kinabalu to Lahad Datu at Subang AFB.

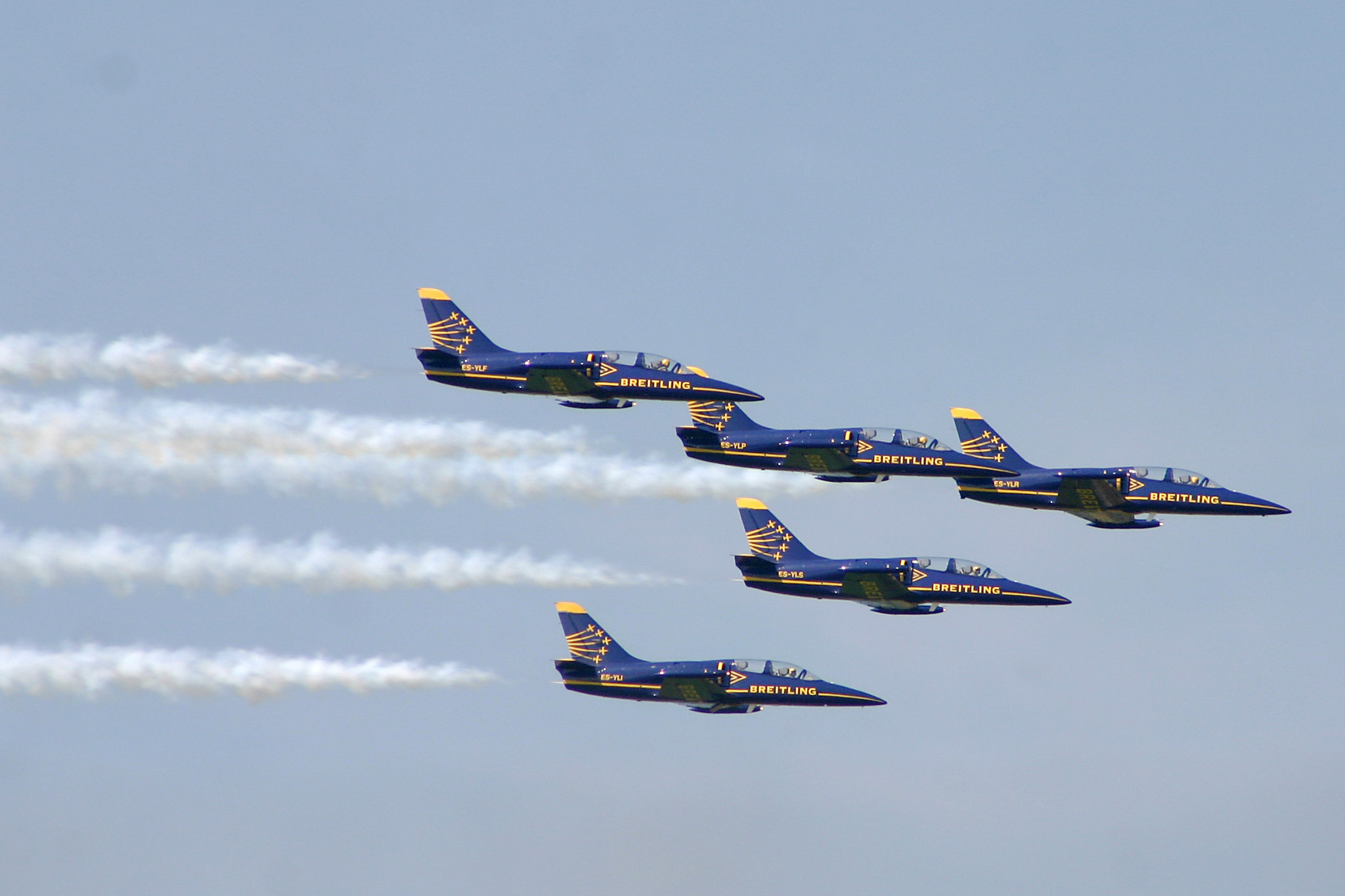
The Breitling Jet Team

- 1 March – 2013 Lahad Datu standoff
  - Two Malaysian police commandos were killed and three police commandos were injured in a shootout between the Malaysian police and the Sulu intruders at the village of Tanduo near Lahad Datu, Sabah. Almost 14 Sulu intruders were killed in a shootout. An immediate curfew was imposed at Lahad Datu town.
- 3 March – 2013 Lahad Datu standoff
  - Five Malaysian policeman were killed in an ambush by the Sulu intruders at the village of Simulu, Semporna, Sabah.
- 5 March – 2013 Lahad Datu standoff
  - Malaysian Armed Forces together with Malaysian Maritime Enforcement Agency (MMEA) and the Royal Malaysian Police launch offensive attacks known as "Ops Daulat" (Operation Sabah's Sovereignty) against Sulu intruders by both land, air and sea at the village of Tanduo near Lahad Datu, Sabah.
  - A formation consisting of six BAE Hawks and three F/A-18D Hornets from the Royal Malaysian Air Force (RMAF) launched an airstrike against the Sulu intruders at Kampung Tanduo. No military casualties are reported in the "Ops Daulat" operation.
- 7 March – 2013 Lahad Datu standoff
  - The Eastern Sabah Security Command (ESSCOM) is established to strengthen maritime security in the eastern part of Sabah since the Lahad Datu standoff.
- 11 March – 2013 Lahad Datu standoff
  - Tanduo declared clean. 97 militants were captured in the "Ops Daulat" operation.
- 12 March – 2013 Lahad Datu standoff
  - Three Sulu militants were killed and one Malaysian Army soldier, Private Ahmad Hurairah Ismail from the 7th Battalion of the Royal Malay Regiment was killed in a shootout in Sungai Nyamuk near Lahad Datu during the "Ops Daulat" operation. He was the first soldier to be killed in action. Meanwhile, another soldier of the Royal Malay Regiment, Ahmad Farhan Ruslan was killed in a road crash near Semporna, Sabah.
- 16 March – The Breitling Jet Team performs its aerobatics jet performance at Subang Skypark.
- 19 March – The Government Transformation Programme (GTP)/Economic Transformation Programme (ETP) stimulus package is announced by the Prime Minister, Mohammad Najib Abdul Razak.
- 23 March – Hong Kong's superstars Jackie Chan joins the Prime Minister, Mohammad Najib Abdul Razak at charity dinner in Kuantan, Pahang.
- 25 March – 2013 Lahad Datu standoff
  - The Eastern Sabah Security Zone (ESSZONE) is established to improve security measures at the east coast of Sabah since the Lahad Datu standoff.
- 27 March – 2013 Lahad Datu standoff
  - The village of Tanduo near Lahad Datu, Sabah, the site of the Sulu militants invasion will be evacuated and the villagers will be relocated to new settlements nearby.
- 28 March – The state legislative assembly of Negeri Sembilan dissolves automatically, a first in Malaysian history.
- 28–30 March – The Langkawi International Maritime and Aerospace Exhibition (LIMA 2013) is held in Langkawi, Kedah.
- 30 March – A crane at the ongoing construction of the Kelana Jaya Line LRT extension at Sultan Abdul Aziz Shah Airport Highway collapsed, killing one person.

=== April ===
- 3 April – Prime Minister Mohammad Najib Abdul Razak announces the dissolution of the 12th parliament via television at 11:30 a.m. local time, to pave way for the 13th general election. He also advised the state legislative assemblies of each state except Negeri Sembilan and Sarawak to simultaneously dissolve.
- 4 April – As of today, the state legislative assemblies of Negeri Sembilan, Perak, Selangor, Malacca, Sabah, Terengganu and Pahang have been dissolved. Chief Minister of Penang Lim Guan Eng would announce the dissolution of the Penang state legislative assembly tomorrow.
- 6 April – Prime Minister Mohammad Najib Abdul Razak launches the 2013 Barisan Nasional manifesto for the 13th general election at the Bukit Jalil National Stadium, Bukit Jalil, Kuala Lumpur.
- 14 April – Official opening of the Terminal Bersepadu Selatan (TBS) by the Prime Minister Mohammad Najib Abdul Razak.
- 20 April – 2013 Malaysian general election
  - The Nominations for candidates. For the first time in Malaysian electoral history, all seats will be contested and no candidate won a seat unopposed, with some candidates facing as many as six opponents.
  - The final closure of the cable stayed bridge at the main navigational span of the Sultan Abdul Halim Muadzam Shah Bridge has been completed.
- 26 April – The Royal Malaysian Customs second deputy director-general, Datuk Shaharuddin Ibrahim was shot dead near a traffic light near the Putrajaya police station.
- 30 April – Prime Minister Mohammad Najib Abdul Razak became the country's first leader to use the 24 km Penang Second Bridge to cross from the island to the mainland to attend a function in Kepala Batas, Seberang Perai.

=== May ===
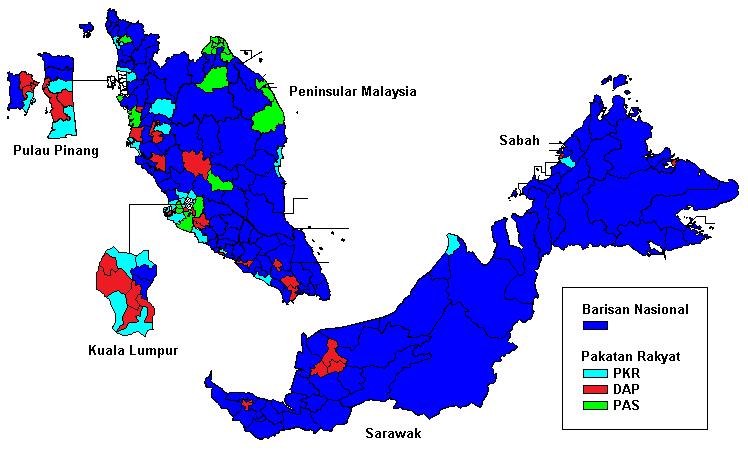
The 2013 Malaysian general election results.

- 5 May – 2013 Malaysian general election
  - Polling day. Barisan Nasional wins a majority with 133 of the 222 parliamentary seats, while Pakatan Rakyat gets 89 seats. Barisan Nasional regains Kedah state from Pakatan Rakyat.
  - Home Affairs Minister Hishammuddin Hussein and his family escaped injury when the helicopter they in were landed on its side due to strong winds at the Royal Malaysian Air Force (RMAF) Simpang Airport.
- 6 May – The FBM KLCI index hits a new high of 1,820 points level after Barisan Nasional won the 13th general elections.
- 8 May – The 2013 Malaysian general election protest or Himpunan Black Out 2013 was organised by Pakatan Rakyat. Held in MBPJ Stadium, Kelana Jaya, Petaling Jaya, Selangor, it was to protest alleged irregularities and occurrences of electoral fraud in the elections that took place three days ago.
- 12 May – British entrepreneur Sir Richard Branson from Virgin Group dresses as an air AirAsia stewardess after losing a bet with fellow motor-racing rival Tony Fernandes during a flight from Perth, Australia to Kuala Lumpur, Malaysia.
- 15 May – Prime Minister Mohammad Najib Abdul Razak announces the new Cabinet. For the first time in Malaysian history, no MCA and Gerakan cabinets are elected.
- 21 May – Six FELDA settlers' children conquered Mount Everest for the first time.
- 23 May – Former lawyer N. Pathmanabhan, 43, and farm hands T. Thilaiyalagan, 21, R. Matan, 22 and R. Kathavarayan, 33, are guilty of murdering Sosilawati Lawiya and her aides at Lot 2001, Jalan Tanjung Layang, Tanjung Sepat, Banting, between 8.30 pm and 9.45 pm on August 30, 2010.
- 23–26 May – The biggest youth festival Festival Belia Putrajaya 2013 is held in Putrajaya.
- 24 May – The new vehicle registration plates for Federal Territory of Kuala Lumpur starting with "W1A" (W 1 A until WYY 9999 Y) will be issued in July this year.
- 28 May – A boat carrying 100 passengers capsizes in the Rajang River in Malaysia's Sarawak state with over 20 passengers missing.

=== June ===
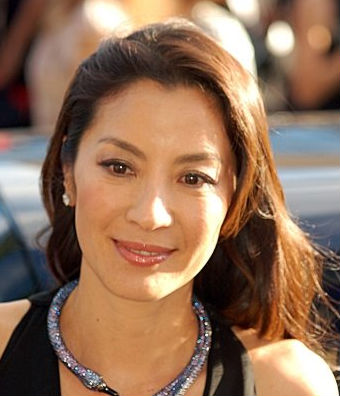
Tan Sri Michelle Yeoh

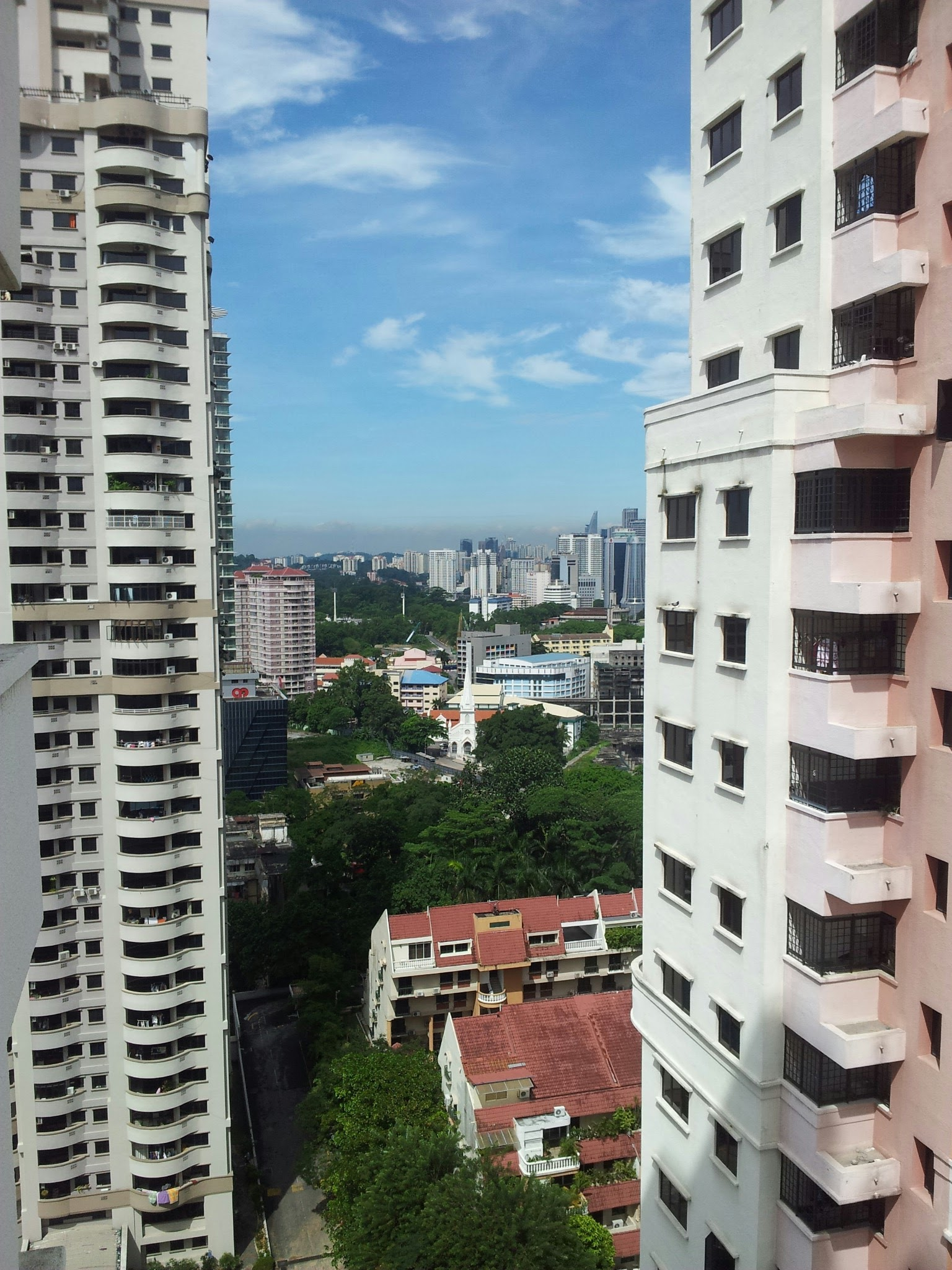
Centre of Kuala Lumpur looking south on 9 May 2013

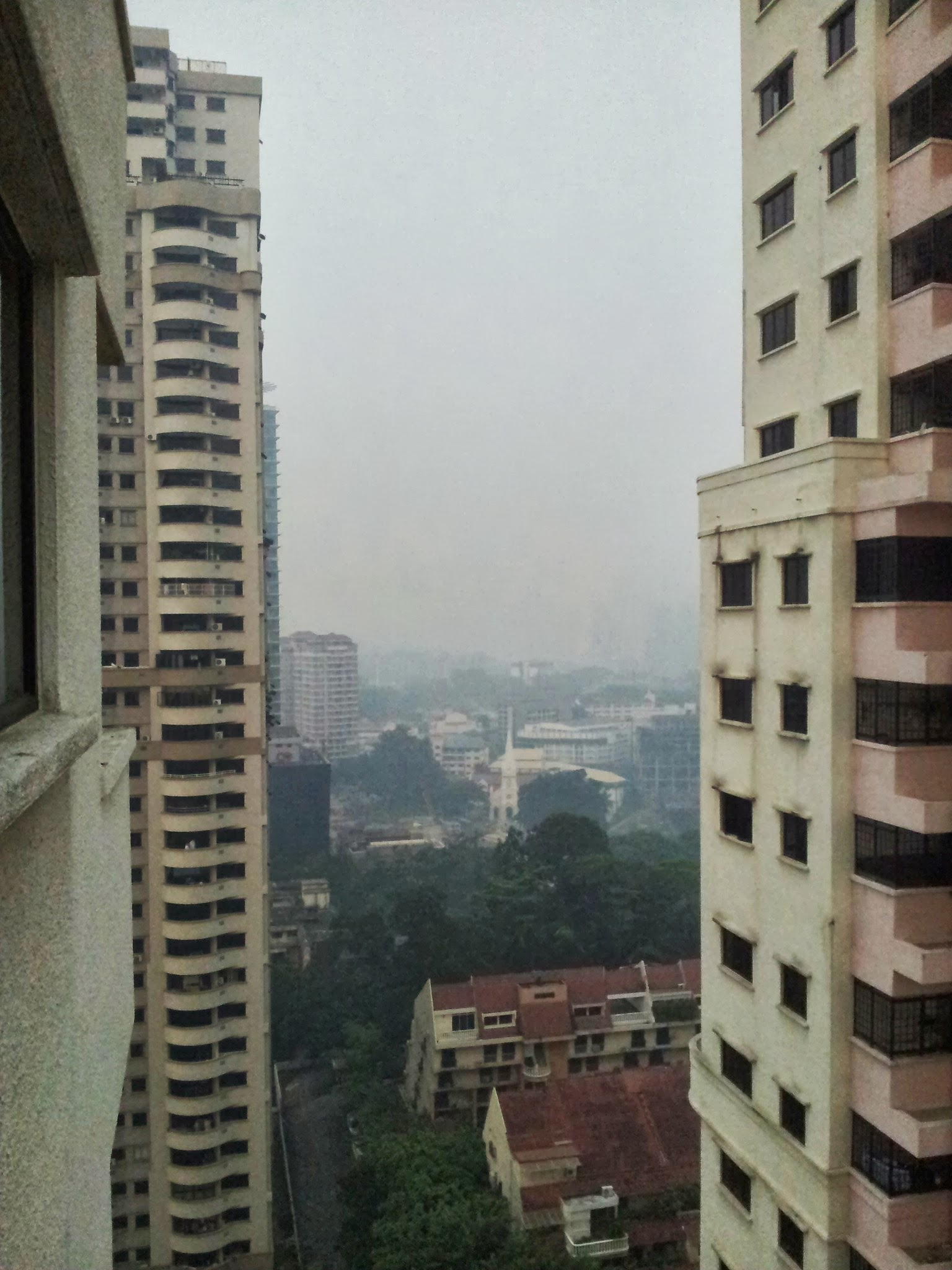
Centre of Kuala Lumpur looking south on 23 June 2013

- 1 June – Local international superstars Michelle Yeoh was conferred the Panglima Setia Mahkota (PSM) awards with the title "Tan Sri" from the Yang di-Pertuan Agong.
- 6 June – A ramp leading to the still under construction Sultan Abdul Halim Muadzam Shah Bridge at Batu Maung, Penang interchange collapsed, burying a car and two motorcycles under the debris. One person was killed in the incident.
- 13 June – Freak storms hit Penang. Several damages had also been reported at George Town including Penang's UMNO Building.
- 15 June – The Proton Saga SV is launched. The car price for the Proton Saga has now reduced from RM 38,895 to RM 33,438.
- 15–26 June – 2013 Southeast Asian haze
  - Several parts Peninsular Malaysia including Selangor, Negeri Sembilan, Malacca and Johor were affected by haze due to the hot season and peat burning in neighbouring Sumatra, Indonesia.
- 20 June – 2013 Southeast Asian haze
  - All 211 schools in Muar District in Johor were ordered to close after the Air Pollutant Index (API) reached a hazardous level of 383.
- 22 June – 2013 Southeast Asian haze
  - At 4 pm, the Air Pollutant Index (API) in Muar, Johor reaches 453.
  - PAS vice-president Datuk Husam Musa was arrested by police in Pandan just as he was making his way to Black 505 rally in Padang Merbok, Kuala Lumpur.
- 23 June – A state of emergency had been declared in Muar and Ledang District in Johor, due to the API level reaching a record high of 750. The state of emergency was lifted two days later.
- 27 June – A power blackout occurred at mostly parts of Sarawak state.
- 29 June – "Ops Daulat" officially ends. A new codename "Ops Sanggah" (Operation Sanggah) officially replaces "Ops Daulat". The new Ops Sanggah operation will come under the Eastern Sabah Security Command (ESSCOM), tasked to monitor and defend 10 coastal districts under the Eastern Sabah Security Zone (ESSZONE) from enemy intrusions since the Lahad Datu standoff.

=== July ===
- 1 July – Sgt Arthur Alber Walter, a former police officer during Malayan Emergency was given a hero's parade at Sungai Siput, Perak. He was honour in the presence of Regent of Perak, Raja Dr Nazrin Shah and Inspector General of Police Tan Sri Khalid Abu Bakar.
- 3 July – Three Myanmar construction workers were killed while others injured in a landslide at a construction site in Taman Sierra, Ukay Perdana near Ulu Klang, Selangor.
- 4 July
  - The ground breaking ceremony for the Battersea Power Station redevelopment project in London, United Kingdom by the Malaysian Prime Minister, Mohammad Najib Abdul Razak and the British Prime Minister, David Cameron.
  - Egyptian president, Mohamed Morsi is deposed in the coup d'état and the country's parliament is suspended. All 3,300 Malaysians in Egypt are reported safe.
- 19 July – Shisha or Hookah is declares haram or forbidden by the National Fatwa Council.
- 24 July – 2013 Kuala Besut by-election
  - Barisan Nasional candidate Tengku Zaihan Che Ku Abd Rahman wins by-elections with 8,288 votes, beating Pas candidate Azlan Yusof with 5,696 votes, by a handy 2,592 vote majority.
- 25 July
  - Japanese Prime Minister Shinzo Abe visits Malaysia and meets his counterpart Mohammad Najib Abdul Razak at Putrajaya, Malaysia.
- 29 July
  - Arab Malaysian Banking Group (AmBank) founder Hussain Najadi was shot dead at a parking lot in Kuala Lumpur, while his wife survived.
  - French Prime Minister Jean-Marc Ayrault visits Malaysia and meets his counterpart Mohammad Najib Abdul Razak at Putrajaya, Malaysia.
  - Jacky Ng Kiat Kee, Malaysian's national basketball player died in heart attack while representing the country in an invitational tournament in China.
- 30 July – The speed limit on federal and state roads has reduced from 90 to 80 km/h during festive seasons only.

=== August ===
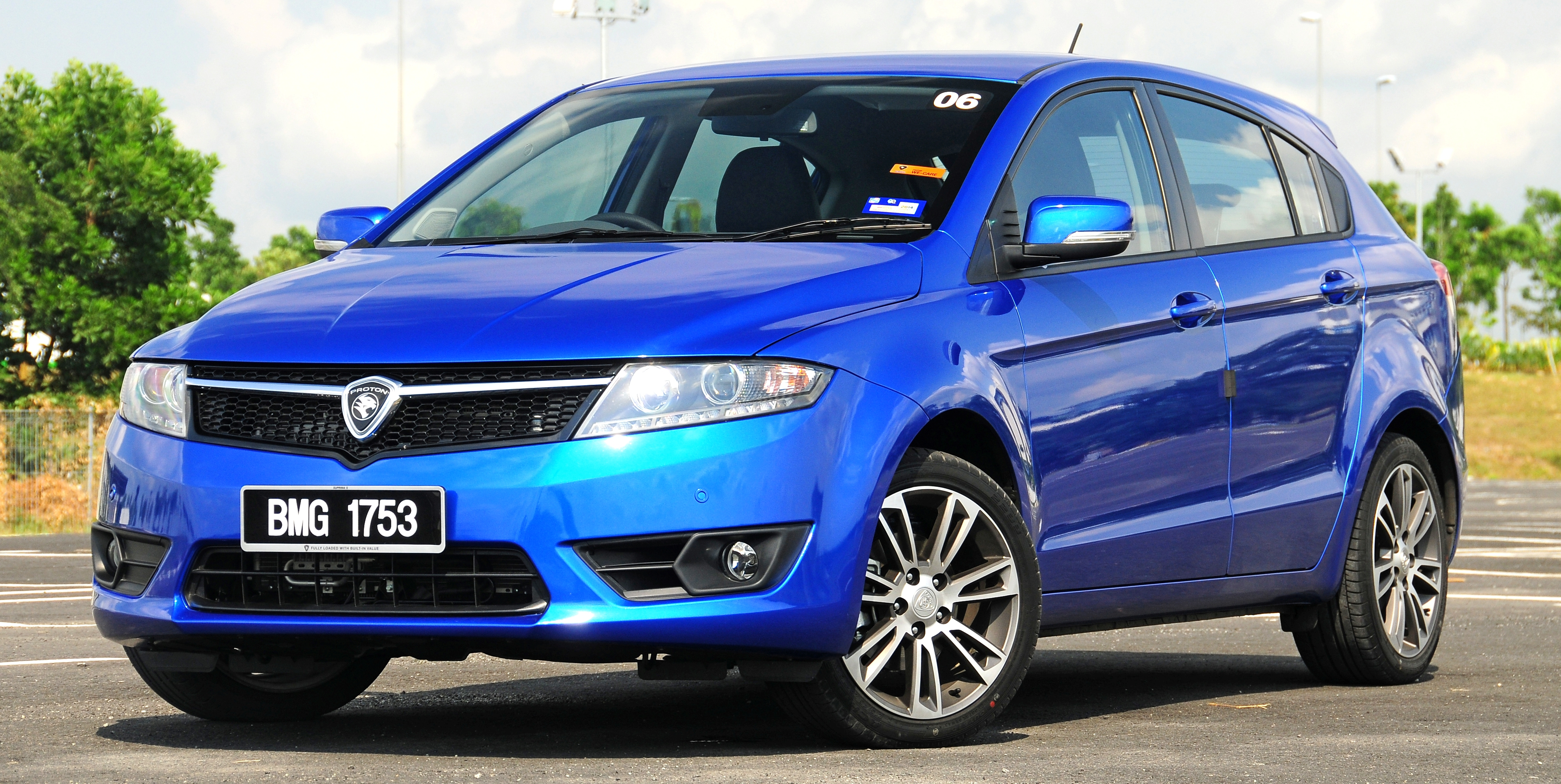
Proton Suprima S.

- 1 August
  - The Rakan Ronda Lebuhraya, Malaysia's Highway Friendly Patrol programme is launched.
  - Chua Boon Huat, Malaysian's national hockey player died in a car accident on Damansara–Puchong Expressway near Kelana Jaya, Selangor.
- 5 August
  - Eight of the 10 members of the Kumpulan Panji Hitam or East Empire of Langkasuka Nusantara deviant group were arrested for attempting to enter Istana Negara palace compound.
  - The Mushaf Al-Quran Printing Centre at Percetakan Nasional Malaysia Berhad (PNMB) in Kuala Lumpur is unveiled by the Prime Minister, Mohammad Najib Abdul Razak. This first Quran printing centre in the country is the second largest Quran printing centre in the world after the King Fahd Complex for the Printing of the Holy Quran at Medina, Saudi Arabia.
- 11 August – The Langkawi Resource Centre (PPL) of Universiti Kebangsaan Malaysia (UKM) in Langkawi, Kedah is unveiled by the Yang di-Pertuan Agong, Sultan Abdul Halim Mu'adzam Shah of Kedah.
- 12 August – One injured in the explosion at Love Lane, George Town, Penang.
- 13 August – Mrs Malaysia Universe Carol Lee crowned Mrs Universe 2013, becoming the first Asian to win the international pageant.
- 14 August – Egypt declares a state of emergency as security forces kill hundreds of demonstrators supporting former president Mohamed Morsi. All 3,300 Malaysians in Egypt are reported safe.
- 16–24 August – Malaysia at the 2013 Asian Youth Games in Nanjing, China.
- 17 August – Proton's latest new hatchback, Proton Suprima S (codenamed P3-22A) is launched by the former fourth Malaysian Prime Minister, Tun Dr. Mahathir Mohamad.
- 18 August – The National Security Council has sent a team to Egypt to evaluate the need to evacuate, and the security of Malaysians in the country.
- 19 August – Ops Cantas, a major crackdown against crime, bandits and triads is launched by police.
- 21 August – 2013 Genting Highlands bus crash
  - At least 37 people were killed and 16 others injured when the bus carrying 53 passengers crashed into ravine at kilometre 3.5 of the Genting Sempah–Genting Highlands Highway near Chin Swee Temple, Genting Highlands, Pahang. It was the worst road disasters in Malaysian history.
- 23 August – All 3,300 Malaysians are sent home from Egypt.
- 25 August – One of Malaysian Battalion (MALBATT 5) soldiers, Sergeant Rosdi Mohamad Zan was killed in a road accident at Houla, Lebanon.
- 26 August – South African President Jacob Zuma visits Malaysia and meets his counterpart Mohammad Najib Abdul Razak at Putrajaya, Malaysia.
- 28 August
  - Five people of a family were killed in a MPV crash at Tangkak–Muar road in Tangkak, Johor.
  - Former South African President, Nelson Mandela is the first recipient of the Lifetime Campaigner for Peace and Freedom of the Mahathir Award for Global Peace. South Africa's current president, Jacob Zuma, received the award from Prime Minister Mohammad Najib Abdul Razak on behalf of Mandela in Putrajaya, Malaysia. At the same event, Najib also presented the Lifetime Campaigner for Global Peace Award to former prime minister Mahathir Mohamad.
- 29 August
  - "Negaraku" national anthem is playing at cinemas for the first time.
  - Shuhaimi Baba's sequel to 1957: Hati Malaya in 2007, Tanda Putera has now released in cinemas.
- 31 August – The biggest military parade for the 56th Merdeka Day is held in Merdeka Square, Kuala Lumpur. About 20 families of the fallen heroes during Lahad Datu standoff took part in this event.

=== September ===
- 2 September – The prices for Diesel fuel increased by 20 cents from RM 1.80 to RM 2.00 and petrol RON 95 increased by 20 cents from RM 1.90 to RM 2.10 began on 3 September.
- 2–4 September – The Yang di-Pertuan Agong Sultan Abdul Halim Mu'adzam Shah of Kedah makes a three-day royal visit to Thailand and meets his counterpart, King Bhumibol Adulyadej.
- 5–7 September – The Yang di-Pertuan Agong Sultan Abdul Halim Mu'adzam Shah of Kedah makes a three-day royal visit to Vietnam and meets the Vietnamese President, Trương Tấn Sang.
- 6 September – The Malaysia Education Blueprint 2013–2025 is unveiled by the Deputy Prime Minister and also the Minister of Educations, Tan Sri Muhyiddin Yassin.
- 9–11 September – The PSKLM International Expressways Conference and Exhibition (PIECE 2013) were held at Persada Johor, Johor Bahru, Johor.
- 11 September – A four-vehicle pile-up involving two express buses, a trailer and a car held up traffic for two hours at kilometre 31.5 of the Kuala Lumpur–Karak Expressway heading towards Kuala Lumpur. Thirteen people, including a couple in the car, were injured in the accident.
- 12 September – KRU Studios most expensive film ever, Vikingdom, is now released in cinemas.
- 13–15 September – The Putrajaya International Fireworks Competition 2013 is held in Putrajaya.
- 14 September – Malaysia wins the 2013 Merdeka Tournament after beating Myanmar 2–0 in the final at Darul Makmur Stadium, Kuantan, Pahang.
- 16 September – Malaysia celebrates its 50 years of formation.
  - The Malaysia Day celebrations are held in Kuching, Sarawak (at morning) and Kota Kinabalu, Sabah (at night).
  - Chin Peng, a former Secretary General of the Malayan Communist Party, a long-time Communist leader during Malayan Emergency (1948–1960) and Communist insurgency in Malaysia (1968–89), dies at the age 88 in Bangkok, Thailand. His body was cremated in Thailand and his ashes would never allow returned to Malaysia.
- 21 September
  - UMNO President Mohammad Najib Abdul Razak and Deputy President Muhyiddin Yassin win uncontested in the UMNO party elections.
  - The biggest military parade for the 80th Armed Forces Day is held in Merdeka Square, Kuala Lumpur.
- 22 September
  - Malaysian Moto2 rider Hafizh Syahrin wins the race in the Round Five of the CEV Repsol Championship in Navarre, Spain. He is the first Malaysian winner of an international Moto2 class race.
  - A marshal was killed in a freak accident ahead of Round Three of the Malaysian Super Series motorcycle race at the Sepang International Circuit while the rider, Mohd Izzat Mohd Abdul Hakim, 17, suffers internal bleeding and is transferred from the Putrajaya Hospital to the Kuala Lumpur Hospital and died 3 days later.
- 26 September – Former Menteri Besar of Kedah Azizan Abdul Razak died at 11.10 am in the Sultanah Bahiyah Hospital, Alor Setar. His body was laid to rest next to the grave of former PAS president Fadzil Noor at Muasasah Darul Ulum in Pokok Sena, Kedah.

=== October ===
- 1 October – Four people died, two in critical condition and about 60 others have been warded food poisoning after eat the chicken dish in a wedding banquet at Tanjung Dawai, Kedah.
- 2 October – The Penilaian Menengah Rendah (PMR) secondary school examinations were held for the last time before being replaced by the Pentaksiran Tingkatan Tiga (PT3) examination next year.
- 3–5 October – Chinese President Xi Jinping makes his three days official visits to Malaysia and meets the Yang di-Pertuan Agong Sultan Abdul Halim Mu'adzam Shah of Kedah and the Prime Minister Mohammad Najib Abdul Razak in Kuala Lumpur.
- 6 October – Canadian Prime Minister Stephen Harper visits Malaysia and meets his counterpart Mohammad Najib Abdul Razak at Putrajaya, Malaysia.
- 10 October – A co-pilot and a passenger were killed while four others were injured after a Twin Otter aircraft belonging to MASWings, crashed while attempting to land from Kudat Airport, Sabah.
- 11–12 October – The 2013 Global Entrepreneurship Summit is held at Kuala Lumpur Convention Centre (KLCC), Kuala Lumpur. US Secretary of State John Kerry (represent US President Barack Obama), Turkish Prime Minister Recep Tayyip Erdoğan, UAE President Khalifa bin Zayed Al Nahyan and the host Malaysian Prime Minister, Mohammad Najib Abdul Razak are also present at the summit. 1MET, a series of boot camps organised with StartupMalaysia to guide and help young entrepreneurs is launched during the summit.
- 12 October – The UMNO party election is held. Datuk Seri Shahrizat Abdul Jalil (Wanita UMNO), Datuk Seri Khairy Jamaluddin (Pemuda UMNO) and Mas Ermieyati Shamsudin (Puteri UMNO) wins this party elections.
- 14 October
  - Solomon Islands Prime Minister Gordon Darcy Lilo visits Malaysia and meets its counterpart Mohammad Najib Abdul Razak at Putrajaya, Malaysia. Solomon Islands opens its High Commissions office in Kuala Lumpur.
  - The Court of Appeal decides that the Catholic Church's weekly newspaper, The Herald will not allow to use the word "Allah" in its Malay Language section to refer to God.
- 17 October – Prime Minister's Science Advisor, Prof Emeritusm Datuk Seri Dr Zakri Abdul Hamid is appointed as a Science Advisory Board to the United Nations Secretary-General, Ban Ki-moon.
- 19 October – The UMNO Supreme Council election is held. Dato' Seri Dr. Ahmad Zahid Hamidi, Dato' Seri Shafie Apdal and Dato' Seri Hishammuddin Hussein, retained their vice-president post in the party elections.
- 20 October – The Legoland Malaysia Water Theme Park, a second Legoland Malaysia Resort's attractions is opened to public.
- 22 October – A 15-year-old girl Ng Yuk Tim who was reported missing two days ago was found stuffed in a suitcase in Jalan Kebun Nenas, Shah Alam, Selangor.
- 23 October
  - Three people died while another is missing in a mud flood in Bertam Valley, Cameron Highlands, Pahang.
  - A security guard shot dead a bank operations officer, Norazita Abu Talib in a robbery at the Ambank branch in USJ Sentral, Subang Jaya, Selangor.
- 24 October
  - The first batch of the Malaysian Battalion (MALBATT) personnel were sent to Lebanon for UNIFIL mission.
  - A delivery boy ran amok in Gombak, Selangor. Two people including a student were killed and two others injured.
- 25 October – 2014 Budget highlights: The Bantuan Rakyat 1Malaysia (BRIM) cash for those with a monthly income of below RM3,000 and single individuals aged 21 and above with income not exceeding RM2,000 a month increased from RM500 to RM650. Sugar subsidy is abolished and a GST tax of six percent starting on 1 April 2015.
- 29 October – Malaysia has surged to the sixth position among 189 economies in the latest World Bank Doing Business Report 2014.

=== November ===
- 3 November – Pahang wins Malaysia Cup for the first time since 21 years after beating Kelantan 1–0 in the final
- 4 November – 2013 Sungai Limau by-election. PAS candidates Mohd Azam Abd Samad wins this by-elections beating Barisan Nasional's candidates Dr Ahmad Sohaimi Lazim with a reduced majority of 1,084 votes.
- 5 November – Over 470,395 candidates sat for the Sijil Pelajaran Malaysia (SPM) 2013 at 3,616 examination centres throughout the country beginning today until 5 December. During the examination, three candidates died in ongoing examination.
- 8 November – Part of Pasar Borong Selangor complex structures in Serdang, Selangor collapsed, leaving several people reportedly injured
- 9 November
  - The two-year-old son of a British expatriate Freddie Joseph who was kidnapped at their home yesterday was founded in Titiwangsa lake park.
  - Form five two girls were slapped with slippers by a teacher after they had apparently been noisy in the library when undergoing SPM examination in Bidor, Perak.
- 10 November
  - The security guard who had shot dead an AmBank employee in Subang Jaya, Selangor in a murder/robbery case last month, was captured in Tanjung Belungkor, Johor while the shotgun weapon that killed him was found in Jalan Subang, Persiaran Penaga, 500m from the crime scene. The suspect's name is Laode Ardina Laode Rasila from Sulawesi, Indonesia.
  - The enforcement head of the Pahang Islamic Religious Department (Jabatan Agama Islam Pahang) (JAIP), Ahmad Rafli Abdul Malek, was shot dead at his house in Indera Mahkota 2 at Bandar Indera Mahkota, Kuantan, Pahang.
- 11 November – Dato' Seri Shahrizat Abdul Jalil, Wanita Umno chief has withdrawn her RM100mil defamation suit against PKR strategic director Mohd Rafizi Ramli and its Wanita chief Zuraida Kamaruddin over a statement involving the National Feedlot Corporation (NFC) issue.
- 15 November – A Taiwanese people tourist was shot dead and his wife is believed to have been kidnapped when gunmen raided a resort in Pom Pom Island in Semporna in the east coast of Sabah.
- 18 November – Prime Minister Mohammad Najib Abdul Razak makes his two days official visits to Bangladesh and meets the president Mohammad Abdul Hamid.
- 22 November – Sultan of Johor, Sultan Ibrahim declares Friday and Saturday as a weekend holidays for Johor.
- 22–24 November – Pan-Malaysian Islamic Party party election. Mohamad Sabu wins this party elections.
- 29 November – Nuzul Quran is declared as a public holidays for Federal Territories of Kuala Lumpur, Labuan and Putrajaya which will begin next year.
- 30 November – The Proton Persona SV is launched.

=== December ===
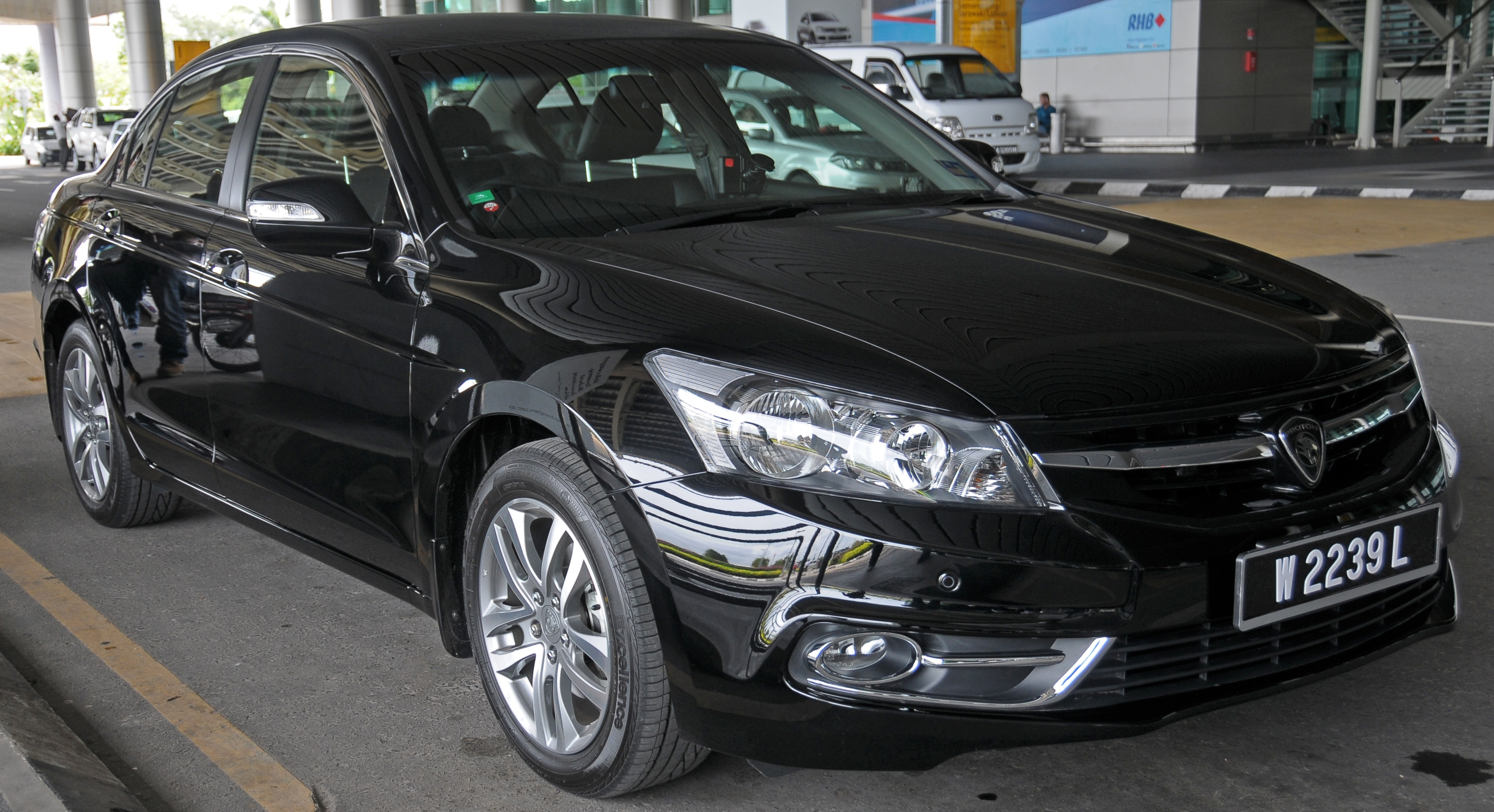
The second generation of Proton Perdana.

- 1 December
  - AirAsia, the low cost airliner wins World Travel Award as the "World's Leading Low-Cost Airline".
  - Three siblings found dead after leaving home on motorcycle at Langgar near Alor Setar, Kedah.
- 2 December – The electricity tariff increased by about 15% for Peninsular Malaysia, and by about 17% for Sabah and Labuan by the next year.
- 2–8 December – Several parts of east coast states including Johor, Pahang, Terengganu and Kelantan were hit by flash floods.
- 5 December
  - The new book, "Chronicle of Malaysia (1963–2013), 50 Years of Headline News" is launched.
  - The bridge in Chukai town, Kemaman, Terengganu collapsed due to strong currents.
- 6 December – Former South African President, Nelson Mandela dies at the age of 95. The Malaysian government and its people conveyed their deepest sympathies and condolences to the government and the people of South Africa on the demise of the former anti-apartheid revolutionary leader.
  - Prime Minister Dato' Sri Mohammad Najib Abdul Razak on his Twitter expressing that "Mandela lives on in the spirit of every human that believes in democracy and freedom. Thank you for your legacy, Madiba".
  - Former Prime Minister Tun Dr. Mahathir Mohamad also expressed that "Truly a great leader with incredible fortitude and unflinching dedication to the cause of social justice. He was a forgiving person. He bore no animosity towards those who had imprisoned him and all he cared about was reconciliation and the sharing of his country’s wealth and opportunities between blacks and whites. Few in the world have exhibited this kind of magnanimity. Whenever I am asked who I admire most among the leaders I have met I have no hesitation in naming Nelson Mandela". Mahathir said the death of his friend was received with great sadness and a deep sense of loss. "His passing is a great personal loss to me and to all African people".
  - Two cabinet ministers, Minister of Federal Territories, Tengku Adnan Tengku Mansor and Minister of Energy, Green Technology and Water, Maximus Ongkili represents the Malaysian government at the memorial service of the former South African president Nelson Mandela in FNB Stadium, Johannesburg while Dr Mahathir attends the Mandela's funeral in Union Buildings, Pretoria, South Africa.
- 8 December – Officially opening of the Pandaruan Bridge or also known as Malaysia–Brunei Friendship Bridge, the bridge of the border of Malaysia–Brunei by the Malaysian Prime Minister, Mohammad Najib Abdul Razak and his counterpart, Sultan Hassanal Bolkiah of Brunei.
- 9 December – Malaysian wushu queen, Phoon Eyin wins her 1,000th gold medal of the Southeast Asian Games since 1959 during wushu event of the 2013 SEA Games in Myanmar.
- 11 December – The second generation of Proton Perdana is launched by the Prime Minister, Mohammad Najib Abdul Razak.
- 11–22 December – Malaysia bags 43 gold medals in the 2013 SEA Games in Myanmar.
- 12 December
  - Prime Minister, Mohammad Najib Abdul Razak makes his working visits to Japan and meets the prime minister Shinzo Abe.
  - Two pilots and six Petronas Carigali workers survived after their helicopter crashed into the sea off Miri while en route to an offshore platform in Sarawak.
- 13 December – First breakthrough for the Earth Pressure Balance Tunnel Boring Machines at the under construction KL Sentral MRT station.
- 14 December
  - Jamalulail family from Sunderland, England returns to Malaysia from United Kingdom after 25,500 km Eurasia journey by a motorhome caravan in 155 days.
  - Malaysia creates a world record in hockey when the national women's hockey squad thrashed Cambodia 36–0 in a second preliminary of 2013 SEA Games match in Myanmar.
- 15 December – World no.1, Lee Chong Wei wins BWF Super Series Masters Finals 2013 after beating Tommy Sugiarto of Indonesia, 20–10, 21–12.
- 17 December – The Genting Integrated Tourism Plan (GITP) and the new Genting Highlands' attractions, Twentieth Century Fox World theme park are launched by the Prime Minister, Mohammad Najib Abdul Razak. The new Twentieth Century Fox World theme park is expected to be completed in 2016.
- 19 December
  - Prime Minister, Mohammad Najib Abdul Razak makes his working visits to Indonesia and meets the president Susilo Bambang Yudhoyono.
  - The Penilaian Menengah Rendah (PMR) secondary school examinations results is the last time before being replaced by the Pentaksiran Berasaskan Sekolah Menengah Rendah (PBSMR) examinations next year. There is a 0.41 per cent increase or 30,988 students scoring straight As in this and last year's PMR results.
- 21 December – Prime Minister, Mohammad Najib Abdul Razak makes his four-day working visits to Saudi Arabia.
- 22 December
  - Liow Tiong Lai is elected as Malaysian Chinese Association (MCA) party president
  - A series of bomb blasts in three Southern Thailand's town of Padang Besar, Sadao and Danok near Malaysia–Thailand border. 24 people were injured in the blasts.
- 23 December – The Sikorsky S-61 "Nuri" helicopter of the Royal Malaysian Air Force (RMAF) crash landed due to a technical fault while on a security assignment in Pulau Perak near Kedah.
- 28 December
  - Malaysia is the first country in South East Asia to be chosen as Theme Nation at Tokyo International Book Fair 2014 next year.
  - Radio Televisyen Malaysia (RTM) celebrates its 50-year anniversary of television broadcasting in Malaysia.
- 30 December – Prime Minister, Mohammad Najib Abdul Razak announced 11 measures to slash public sector expenditure beginning 1 January 2014, one of which is the reduction by 10 per cent of the entertainment allowance of ministers and deputy ministers.
- 31 December – Thousands of protesters comprising mostly tertiary students rallied against the rising cost of living near Merdeka Square, Kuala Lumpur. The New Year's Eve concert at the Merdeka Square had to be called off about 30 minutes before the countdown as protesters broke through the police cordon to seize the stage.

== National Day and Malaysia Day ==
- National Day Theme: Malaysiaku Berdaulat, Tanah Tumpahnya Darahku (My Sovereign Malaysia, The Land Where My Blood Has Spilt)
- Malaysia Day Theme:
  - 50 Tahun Jubli Emas Sarawak Merdeka Dalam Malaysia (50th Golden Jubilee Sarawak Within Malaysia)
  - 50 Tahun Jubli Emas Sabah Maju Jaya Dalam Malaysia (50th Golden Jubilee Sabah Within Malaysia)

=== National Day parade ===
Merdeka Square, Kuala Lumpur

=== Malaysia Day celebrations ===
==== 50th Golden Jubilee Sarawak Within Malaysia celebrations ====
Independence Esplanade, Kuching, Sarawak (also venue of national-level Malaysia Day celebrations)

==== 50th Golden Jubilee Sabah Within Malaysia celebrations ====
Taman Philip, Tanjung Aru, Kota Kinabalu, Sabah

== Sports ==
- 15–20 January – 2013 Malaysia Super Series.
- 20 February–2 March – 2013 Tour de Langkawi.
- 21–24 March – 2013 Maybank Malaysian Open.
- 22–24 March – 2013 Petronas Malaysian Grand Prix.
- 19–26 May – 2013 Sudirman Cup, Kuala Lumpur: The Malaysian team concluded their campaign at Group stage.
- 26–30 June – 2013 Jelajah Malaysia.
- 28 June – 7 July – 2013 Sukma Games in Kuala Lumpur: One of the only two elective Sukma Games to have been held in history.
- 21 July – Chelsea FC Asia Tour 2013: Malaysia vs Chelsea FC.
- 10 August – Friendly matches: Malaysia vs FC Barcelona.
- 31 August–1 September – Malaysia Merdeka Endurance Race 2013.
- 4–15 September – 2013 Merdeka Tournament, Kuantan, Pahang.
- 27–29 September – WTA Tennis Malaysian Open 2013.
- 10–13 October – Sime Darby LPGA Malaysia Tournament 2013.
- 11–13 October – 2013 Shell Advance Malaysian Motorcycle Grand Prix
- 24–27 October – CIMB Classics 2013.
- 8–10 November – 2013 South East Asia Shooting Championships.
- 11–15 November – 2013 BWF Super Series Masters Finals.
- 17 November – 2013 Penang Bridge International Marathon.

== Deaths ==
- 3 January – Kanang anak Langkau - An Iban soldier and hero during the Communist insurgency in Malaysia (1968–1989).
- 16 January – William Yau Zhen Zhong – A six-year-old boy.
- 28 January – Eddy Choong – Legendary badminton player, a four-time All-England champion.
- 6 February – Yahya Sulong – Malay veteran comedian.
- 12 April – Datuk Paduka Fatimah Abdul Majid – Co-founders of UMNO and Member of Dewan Rakyat between 1964 and 1978.
- 19 April – Tan Sri Aishah Ghani - UMNO veteran and former Welfare Minister.
- 28 May – Tan Sri Ainuddin Wahid – Educationist.
- 4 June – S. Shamsuddin – Veteran actor.
- 12 July – Datuk Seri Abu Zahar Ithnin – 8th Chief Minister of Malacca (1997–1999).
- 19 July – Abdul Razak Abdul Hamid - Academian and sole Malaysian survivor of Hiroshima atomic bomb.
- 28 July – Jacky Ng Kiat Kee – Malaysian's national basketball player.
- 29 July – Hussain Ahmad Najadi – Arab Malaysian Banking Group (AmBank) founder.
- 1 August – Chua Boon Huat – Malaysian's national hockey player.
- 9 August – Ishtiaq Mubarak – Former national athlete.
- 16 September – Chin Peng – Former Secretary General of the Malayan Communist Party, a long-time Communist leader during Malayan Emergency (1948–1960) and Communist insurgency in Malaysia (1968–1989).
- 26 September – Azizan Abdul Razak – 10th Menteri Besar of Kedah (2008–2013) and Sungai Limau, Kedah's State Assemblyman.
- 21 October – Ng Yuk Tim – A 15-year-old girl.
- 2 November – Ahmad Ammar Ahmad Azam – moderate Islamic activist in Malaysia and Turkey.
- 1 December - Rahmah Binti Musa – Spouse of Abdul Rahman Talib.
- 17 December – Azean Irdawaty – Veteran actress.

== See also ==
- 2013
- 2012 in Malaysia | 2014 in Malaysia
- History of Malaysia
- List of Malaysian films of 2013
