= 2014 Cameron Highlands mud floods =

Disaster in Malaysia

The 2014 Cameron Highlands mud floods took place in Cameron Highlands, Pahang, Malaysia on 5 and 6 November 2014. More than 20 houses in Ringlet town, Ringlet new village, Kampung Ulu Merah Ringlet and Bertam Valley were submerged in knee-deep flood waters. At least three people were killed while five others were injured, according to official reports. The electrical supply to the affected villages was cut off for several weeks. About 90 victims from 28 families were evacuated to a relief centre in Ringlet. This was the second time that mud floods of this magnitude had ravaged the Bertam Valley since the 2013 mud floods. The mud floods had been largely attributed to illegal land clearing by foreign illegal immigrants who were involved in the rapidly expanding agricultural industry there. Pahang Sultan Ahmad Shah has orders to stop the illegal farming and there is a claim of corruption involving the illegal land clearing.

== See also ==
- 2013 Cameron Highlands mud floods
