= 2013 Cameron Highlands mud floods =

Natural disaster in Malaysia

The 2013 Cameron Highlands mud floods took place on 23 October 2013. Three people died while another was missing due to the mud flood in Bertam Valley, Cameron Highlands, Pahang, Malaysia. Heavy rain had occurred continuously since 7:00pm the day before, creating a need to alleviate the water in the dam the morning of the flood. The water from in the dam was released three times starting with the first at midnight, then another at 1:00am, and finally again at 2:45am. The flash flood occurred at 1:00am as a result of the release of the water from the Sultan Abu Bakar dam in Ringlet that forced the Bertam River to suddenly rise and breach its banks. In the aftermath, around 10 kongsi houses that were on the banks of the river were destroyed, roughly 80 houses were damaged, some of which were 3 km away, and 100 vehicles suffered damage.

== Causes of mud floods ==
The Cameron Highlands are susceptible to flash floods that carry silt because of the human involvement in the area. The deforestation of the area causes the water runoff and is one of the main reasons they have flash floods. One of the effects of the clearing of land for agriculture use is the heavy soil erosion that occurs in the Cameron Highlands. This is a contributing factor to the floods because as the people illegally clear the land, the runoff can carry more silt with it. This places large amounts of silt into the rivers making them shallower and easier to fill which causes floods. On top of this, the rivers are narrow due to the structures built on the banks and even illegal extensions into the river. Another issue contributing to the water runoff is the use of plastic roofing over plots of vegetation. These areas would normally offer some buffer to flooding by absorbing water. Instead, the plastic used by many people in the area speeds up the rainwater running off into the rivers which can lead to the floods.

== See also ==
- 2014 Cameron Highlands mud floods
