= 2012 in Malaysia =

- Decades: 1990s; 2000s; 2010s; 2020s
- See also: Other events of 2012; History of Malaysia • Timeline • Years

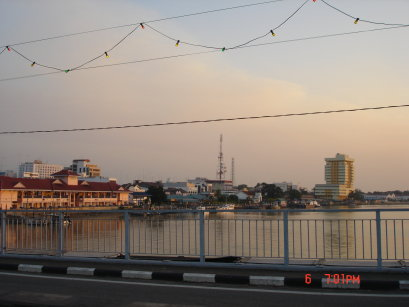
Muar (Bandar Maharani), the royal town of Johor.

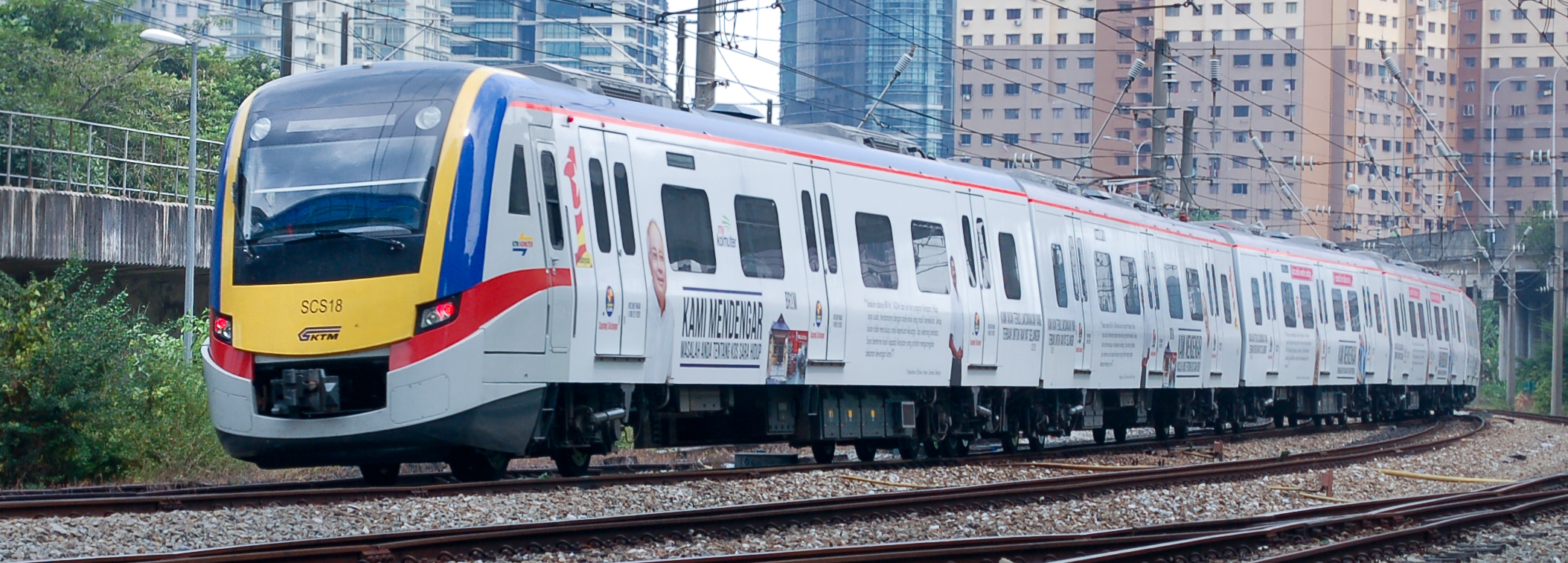
The new KTM Komuter's six-car-set trains, MyKomuter (KTM Class 92).

2012 in Malaysia is the 55th anniversary of Malaysia's independence.

== Incumbents ==
=== Federal level ===
- Yang di-Pertuan Agong: Sultan Abdul Halim Mu'adzam Shah of Kedah
- Raja Permaisuri Agong: Sultanah Haminah Hamidun of Kedah
- Deputy Yang di-Pertuan Agong: Sultan Muhammad V of Kelantan
- Prime Minister: Mohammad Najib Abdul Razak
- Deputy Prime Minister: Muhyiddin Yassin
- President of the Dewan Negara: Abu Zahar Ujang
- Speaker of the Dewan Rakyat: Pandikar Amin Mulia
- Chief Justice: Arifin Zakaria

=== State level ===
- Johor:
  - Sultan of Johor: Sultan Ibrahim
  - Menteri Besar of Johor: Abdul Ghani Othman
- Kedah:
  - Sultan of Kedah: (Council of Regency of Kedah)
    - Tunku Annuar (chairman)
    - Tunku Sallehuddin (Members I)
    - Tunku Abdul Hamid Thani (Members II)
    - Tunku Puteri Intan Safinaz (Members III)
  - Menteri Besar of Kedah: Azizan Abdul Razak
- Kelantan:
  - Sultan of Kelantan: Sultan Muhammad V
  - Menteri Besar of Kelantan: Nik Abdul Aziz Nik Mat
- Perlis:
  - Raja of Perlis: Tuanku Syed Sirajuddin
  - Menteri Besar of Perlis: Md Isa Sabu
- Perak:
  - Sultan of Perak: Sultan Azlan Muhibbuddin Shah
  - Menteri Besar of Perak: Zambry Abdul Kadir
- Pahang:
  - Sultan of Pahang: Sultan Haji Ahmad Shah Al-Musta'in Billah
  - Menteri Besar of Pahang: Adnan Yaakob
- Selangor:
  - Sultan of Selangor: Sultan Sharafuddin Idris Shah
  - Menteri Besar of Selangor: Abdul Khalid Ibrahim
- Terengganu:
  - Sultan of Terengganu: Sultan Mizan Zainal Abidin
  - Menteri Besar of Terengganu: Ahmad Said
- Negeri Sembilan:
  - Yang di-Pertuan Besar of Negeri Sembilan: Tuanku Muhriz
  - Menteri Besar of Negeri Sembilan: Mohamad Hasan
- Penang:
  - Governor of Penang: Tun Abdul Rahman Abbas
  - Chief Minister of Penang: Lim Guan Eng
- Malacca:
  - Governor of Malacca: Tun Mohd Khalil Yaakob
  - Chief Minister of Malacca: Mohd Ali Rustam
- Sarawak:
  - Governor of Sarawak: Tun Abang Muhammad Salahuddin
  - Chief Minister of Sarawak: Abdul Taib Mahmud
- Sabah:
  - Governor of Sabah: Tun Juhar Mahiruddin
  - Chief Minister of Sabah: Musa Aman

== Events ==
=== January ===
- 8 January – Selangor State EXCO, Datuk Dr. Hasan Mohamed Ali is sacked from PAS and the State EXCO.
- 9 January – Opposition leader Dato' Seri Anwar Ibrahim was found acquitted by the High Court for sodomy charges. Three people were injured in an explosion near the Kuala Lumpur Courts Complex in Jalan Duta.

=== February ===
- 1 February – Eight foreigners mainly Afghanistan and Iranian were missing after the long boat they were in capsized at Tanjung Semayong in Sedili, Johor.
- 5 February – Muar, also known as Bandar Maharani, was declared as a royal town of Johor by Sultan Ibrahim of Johor.
- 18 February – Astro NJOI, the first free satellite television in collaboration with the government of Malaysia and Astro is launched.

=== March ===
- 5 March – Two people were killed and more than a dozen were injured when a bus carrying 24 Indian nationals went out of control and overturned as it was coming down from Genting Highlands at Kilometre—of the Genting Sempah–Genting Highlands Highway, Pahang.
- 8 March
  - 5-year-old girl Nurul Nadira or Dirang who went missing, was found dead at an oil palm estate in Nusa Damai near Masai, Johor.
  - The new KTM Komuter's six-car-set trains, MyKomuter (KTM Class 92) is officially launched by the Malaysian Prime Minister, Mohammad Najib Abdul Razak.
- 15 March – The remains of the Royal Air Force personnel in the RAF Dakota C4 crash at Gua Musang, Kelantan on 25 August 1950, were laid to rest at the Commonwealth War Graves in Cheras, Kuala Lumpur.

=== April ===
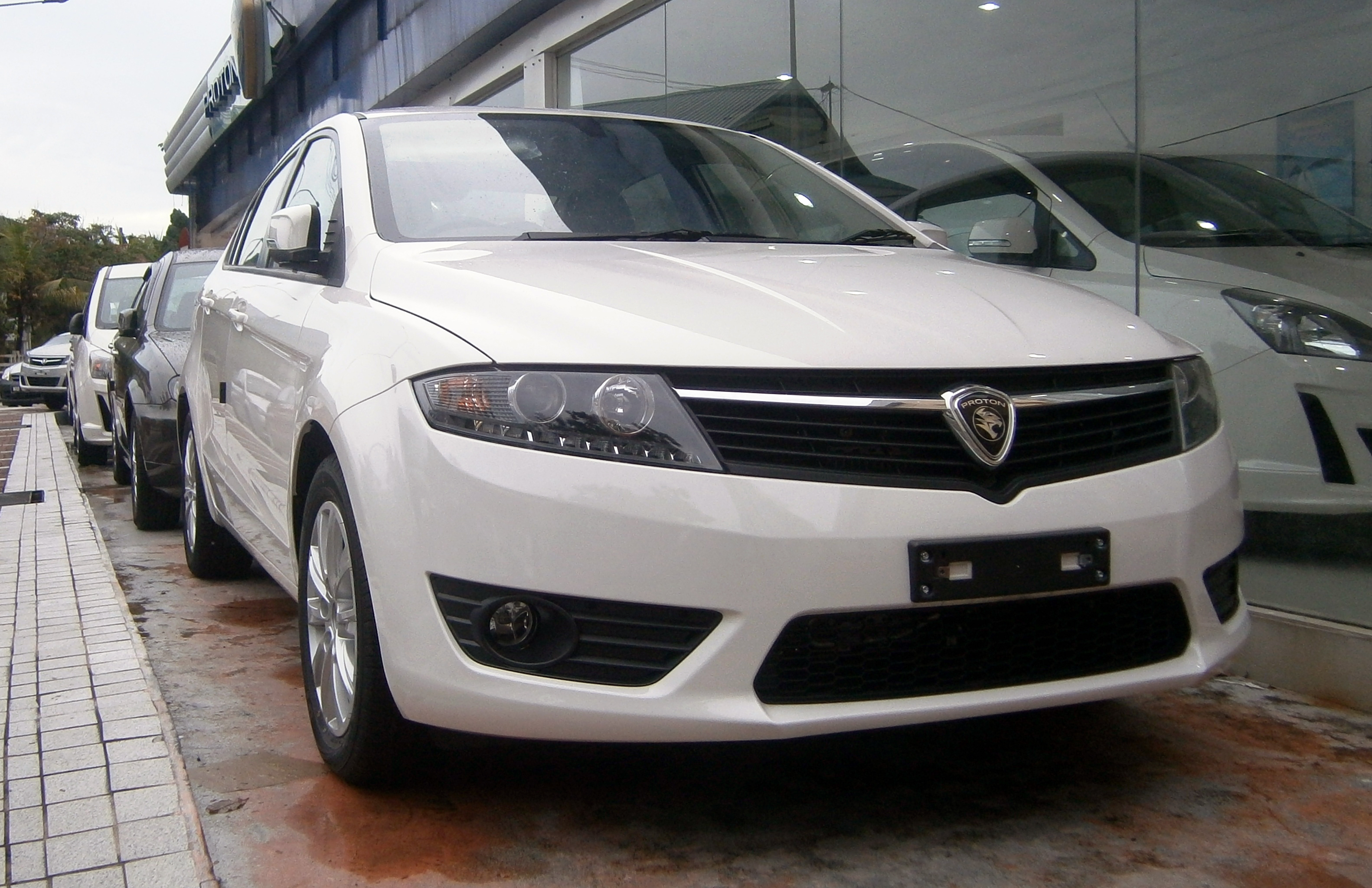
Proton Prevé

- 5 April – FA of Malaysia (FAM) deputy president Tan Sri Annuar Musa was suspended for 2½ years by the association’s disciplinary board in criticising the national team and coach Datuk K. Rajagobal.
- 11 April – Sultan Abdul Halim Mu'adzam Shah of Kedah is installed as the 14th Yang di-Pertuan Agong for the second time at the new Istana Negara palace in Jalan Tuanku Abdul Halim, Kuala Lumpur, Malaysia.
- 12 April – British Prime Minister, David Cameron visits Malaysia for the first time and meets the Prime Minister, Mohammad Najib Abdul Razak.
- 15 April – The opening of Malacca Golf Gallery in Malacca.
- 16 April – The Proton Prevé (codenamed P3-21A), Malaysia's first global car is launched.
- 17 April – Kazakhstan's President, Nursultan Nazarbayev visits Malaysia.
- 28 April – The Bersih 3.0 rally take place in Kuala Lumpur. More than 250,000 people take part in the rally. Police fired teargas and water cannon to the protestors near Merdeka Square and arrest more than 500 people in the demonstration.

=== May ===
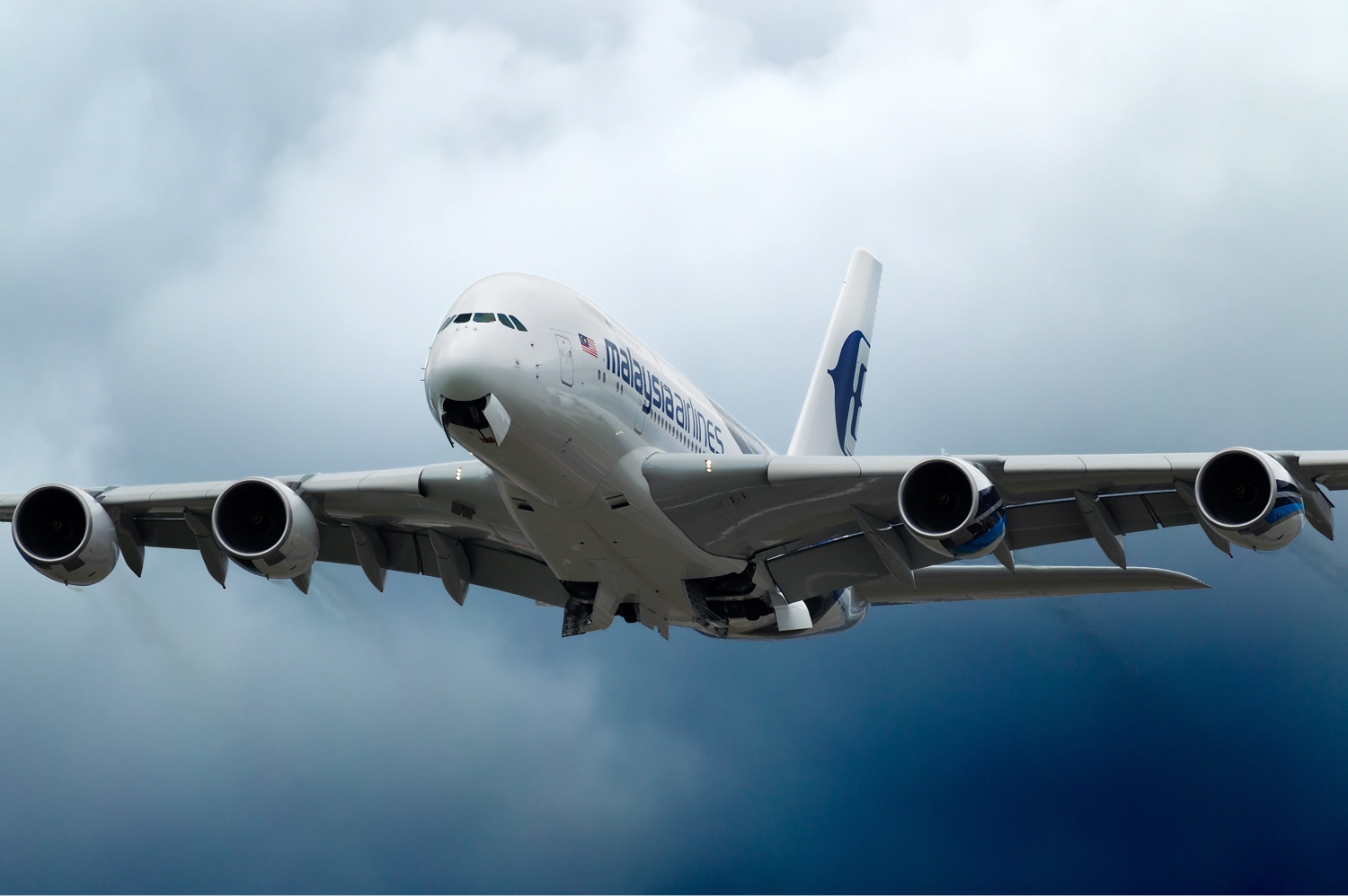
A Malaysia Airlines Airbus A380.

- 11 May – The UMNO's 66th anniversary celebration is held at the Bukit Jalil National Stadium, Bukit Jalil, Kuala Lumpur. More than 100,000 UMNO members take part in this biggest event of the party's history.
- 13 May – Official launching of the Pengerang Integrated Petroleum Complex (PIPC) project or Refinery and Petrochemical Integrated Development (RAPID) project in Pengerang, Johor by the Sultan Ibrahim of Johor.
- 22 May – The establishment of Glulam Gallery in Johor Bahru, Johor.
- 30 May – Malaysia Airlines (MAS) received its first Airbus A380.

=== June ===
- 1 June – The Royal Commission of Inquiry (RCI) to tackle the problem of illegal immigrants in Sabah was set up.
- 9 June – The Sunway Bus Rapid Transit (Sunway BRT) project is officially launched by the Prime Minister, Mohammad Najib Abdul Razak. This will be the first bus rapid transit (BRT) in the country.
- 10 June – More than 30,000 people gathered at Istana Pasir Pelangi in Johor Bahru to pledge their support and loyalty to Sultan of Johor, Sultan Ibrahim.
- 15 June – Several parts of Peninsular Malaysia are affected by haze.
- 16–22 June — Malaysia at the 2012 Asian Beach Games in Haiyang, China.
- 22 June – The Security Offences (Special Measures) Act 2012 was gazetted to replace the Internal Security Act 1960 (ISA).
- 26 June – The opening of Macau Gallery Malacca in Peringgit, Malacca.

=== July ===
- 26 July – One crew members was killed and three others were injured in an MV Bunga Alpinia 3 tanker explosion in Labuan.
- 27 July – 12 August – Malaysia completed at the 2012 Summer Olympics in London, United Kingdom.

=== August ===
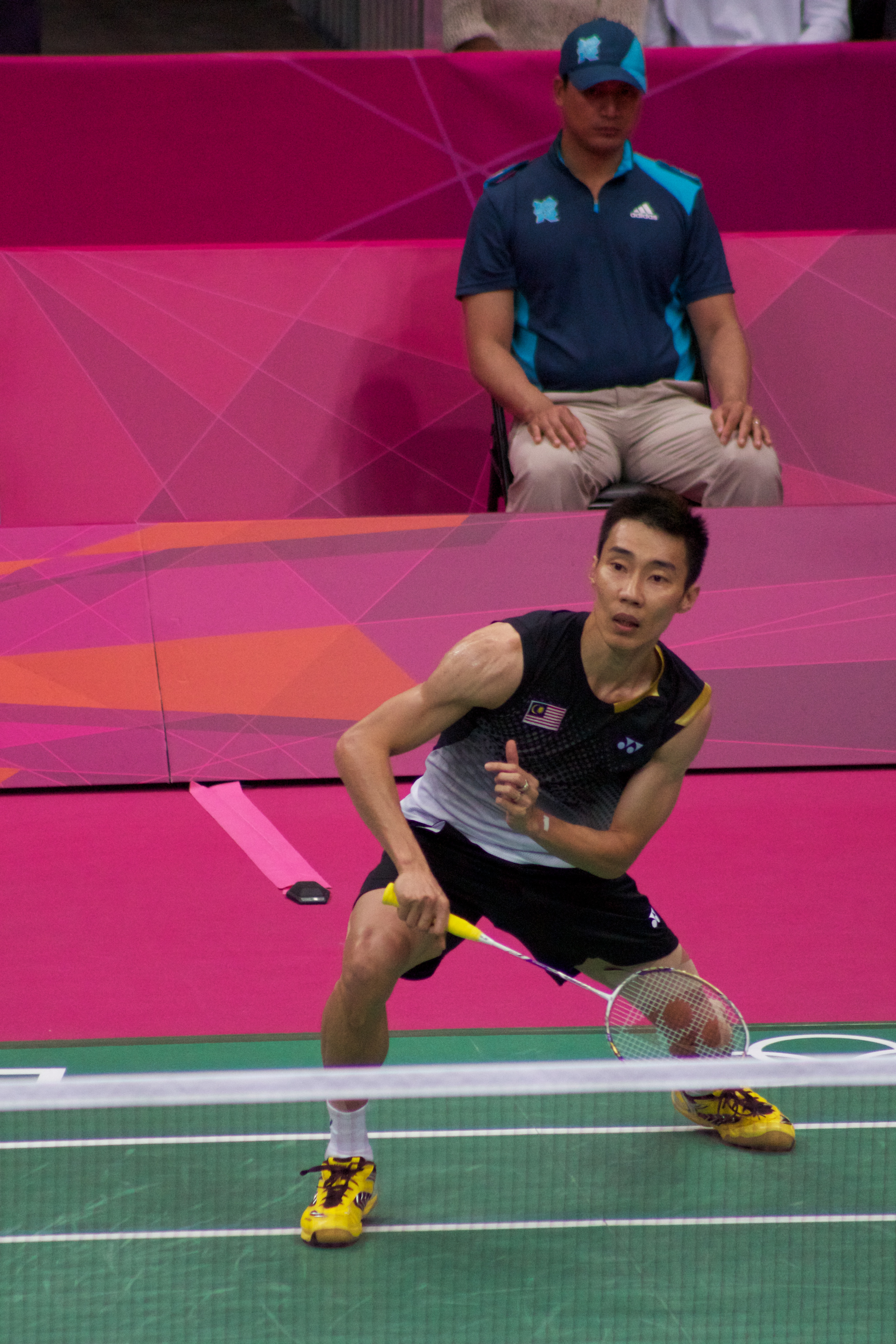
Malaysian badminton player, Lee Chong Wei at the 2012 Summer Olympics in London, United Kingdom.

- 5 August – 2012 Summer Olympics in London, United Kingdom:
  - Malaysian badminton player, Lee Chong Wei, won a silver medal for the second time.
- 9 August – 2012 Summer Olympics in London, United Kingdom:
  - Malaysian diver Pandelela Rinong won a bronze medal in the 10 metre diving platform for the first time.
  - This was the first female Malaysian athlete to win a medal at the Olympics, as well as the first to win an Olympic medal in any sport other than Badminton.
- 10 August – Ops Selamat (formerly Ops Sikap) is launched by the Royal Malaysia Police.
- 31 August – The Himpunan Janji Ditepati gathering was held at Bukit Jalil National Stadium, Bukit Jalil, Kuala Lumpur. It would set a world record of having one million tweets hashtaged #Merdeka55 containing messages of independence between 8:15 and 9:15 pm.

=== September ===
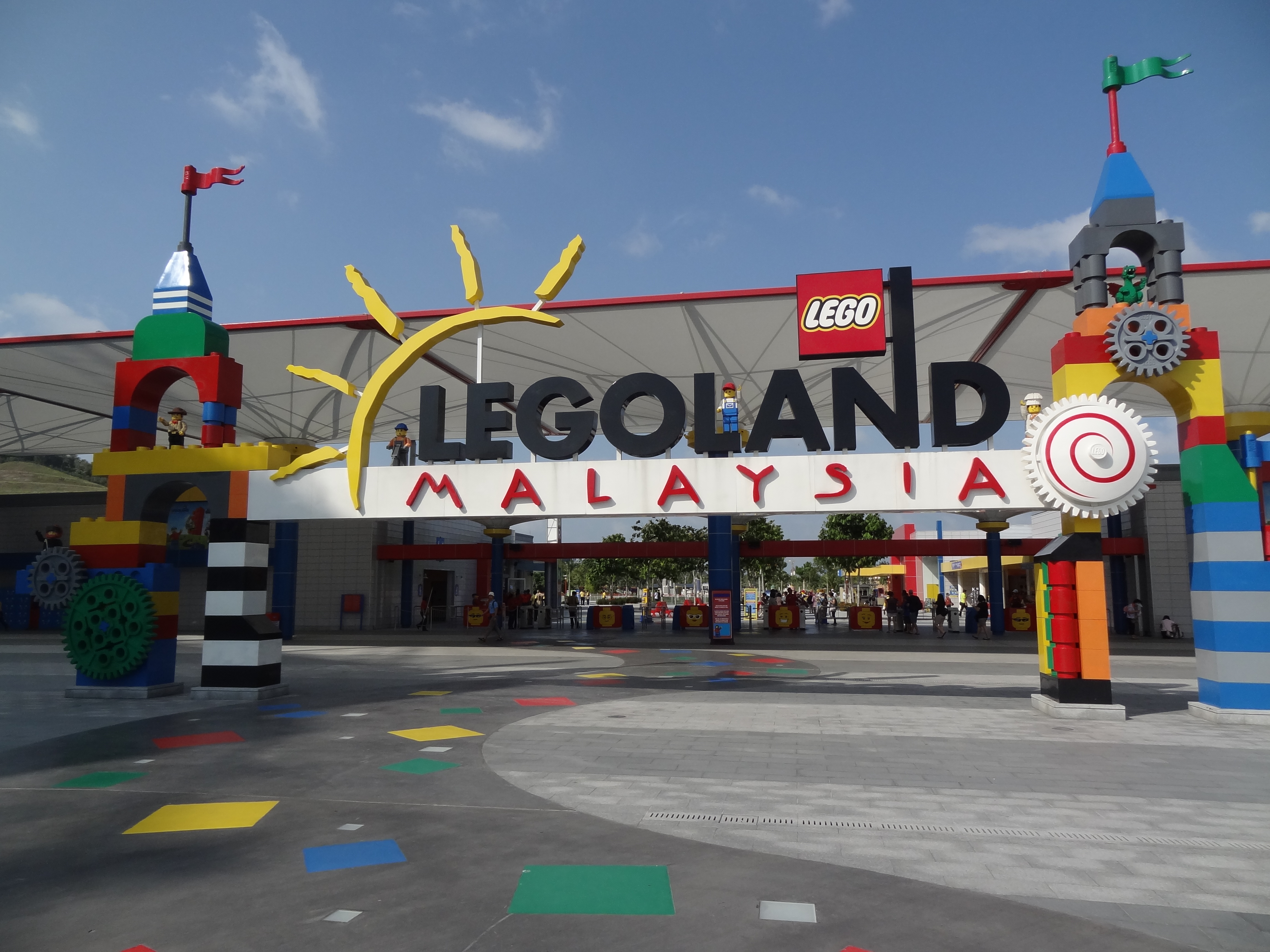
Legoland Malaysia Resort in Iskandar Puteri, Johor opened on 15 September.

- 4 September – Two Malaysian medical students were killed in the road crash at Vladimir, Russia.
- 11 September – The preliminary report of Malaysia Education Blueprint 2013–2025 was introduced. The government made the report based on public opinions about education in Malaysia. There are 11 areas of reform which will be made in 3 phases.
- 13–15 September – The Duke William and Duchess of Catherine (William and Kate) were on a 3-day official visit to Malaysia, representing Queen Elizabeth II for the Royal Jubilee celebrations.
- 15 September – Legoland Malaysia Resort in Iskandar Puteri, Johor is opened to the public.
- 16 September – The Malaysia Day celebrations was held at Lapangan Terbang Lama, Bintulu, Sarawak. This is the first such celebration held on a large scale in Sarawak.
- 18 September – Mechanical heart girl, Tee Hui Yi, who underwent a successful double heart transplant on 5 October 2007, died at the Batu Pahat Hospital at 10:02 am after complaining of back and chest pains at about 7 am.
- 22 September
  - Muslims and non-Muslims in various parts of Malaysia made peaceful protests over the film Innocence of Muslims.
  - The Automated Enforcement System (AES) came into force at all major roads, highways and expressways nationwide.
- 23 September – The Urban Transformation Centre (UTC) for Kuala Lumpur at Pudu Sentral is officially launched.

=== October ===
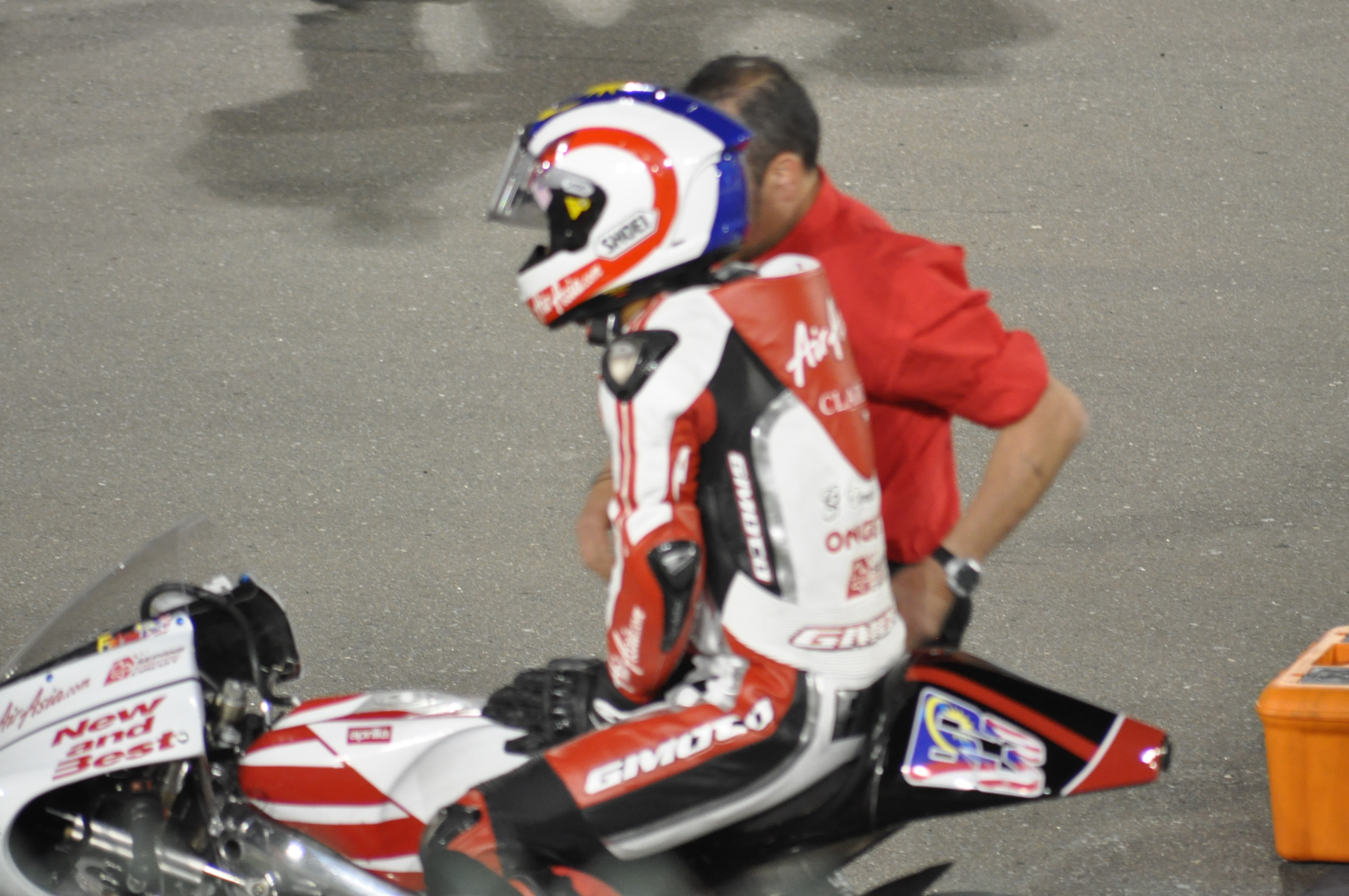
Malaysian Moto3 rider, Zulfahmi Khairuddin.

- 10 October – Six of family killed while two others were seriously injured when they car collided with an express bus at Kuantan-Kuala Terengganu road near Meraga Beris, Kijal, Terengganu.
- 15 October – The Framework Agreement on the Bangsamoro between the Philippine Government, the Malaysian government and Moro Islamic Liberation Front was signed which calls for the abolishing of the Autonomous Region in Muslim Mindanao, to be replaced with a new autonomous region called Bangsamoro within a two-year period.
- 20 October – Malaysian Moto3 rider, Zulfahmi Khairuddin wins the second place of the 2012 Malaysian Motorcycle Grand Prix.
- 25 October – The Kota Kinabalu International Airport (KKIA) was closed Thursday night after the runway lights malfunctioned, forcing several incoming and outgoing flights to be cancelled or rescheduled and leaving many passengers stranded.
- 28 October – 11 November – Inaugural Sukipt Games in Universiti Teknologi Mara.

=== November ===
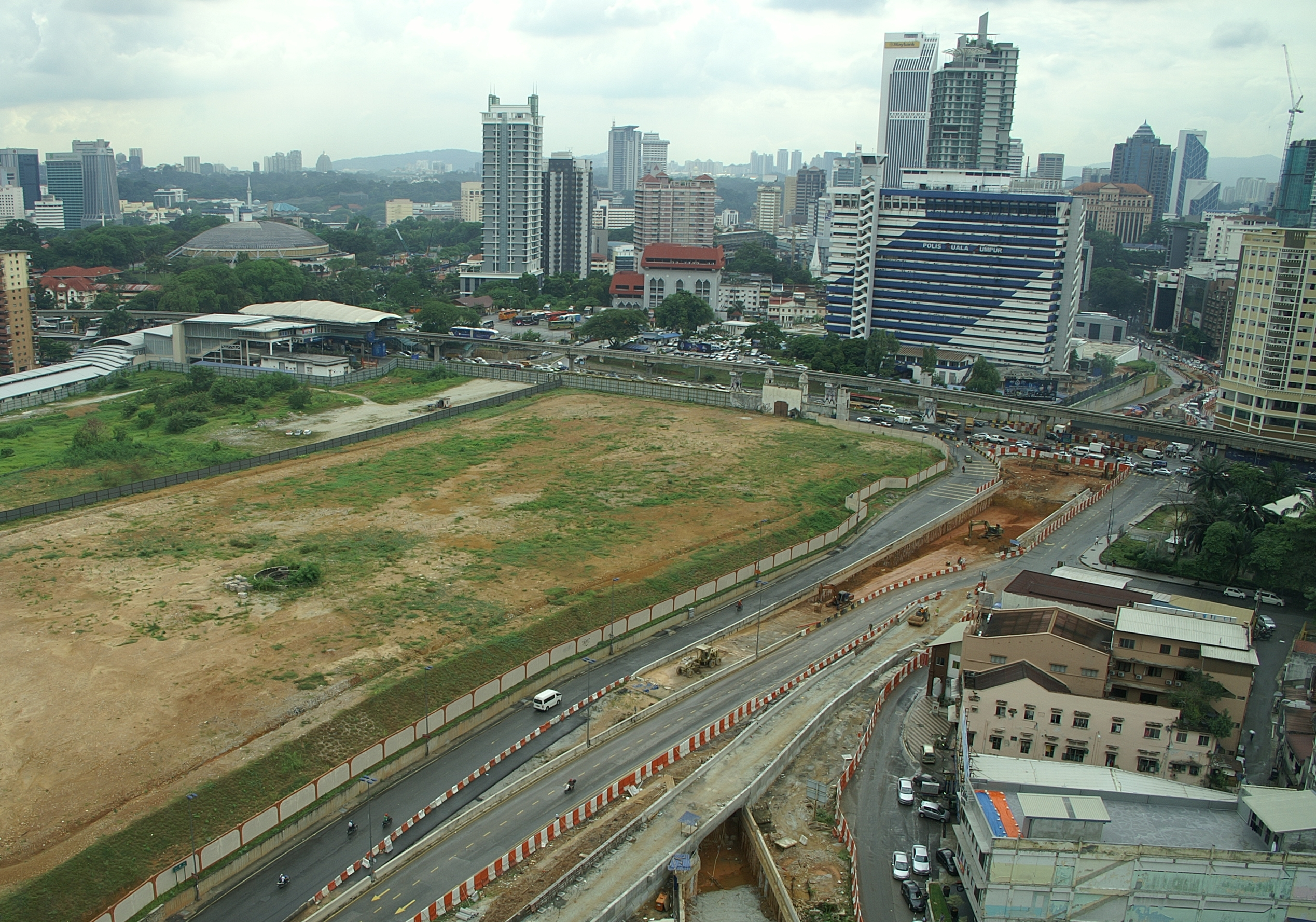
The site of Pudu Prison after demolition.

- 5 November – Several parts of states in Peninsular Malaysia, Selangor, Johor and Malacca were hit by flash floods.
- 9–10 November – The wedding dinner reception of badminton players Lee Chong Wei and Wong Mew Choo was held at Kuala Lumpur Convention Centre.
- 12 November – The 1 Malaysia Call Centre (603-8000 8000) is launched.
- November – All buildings within the Pudu Prison complex were completely demolished to make way for redevelopment.
- 21 November – Four PROPEL workers were killed in the trailer crash at North–South Expressway Northern Route near Gopeng, Perak.

=== December ===
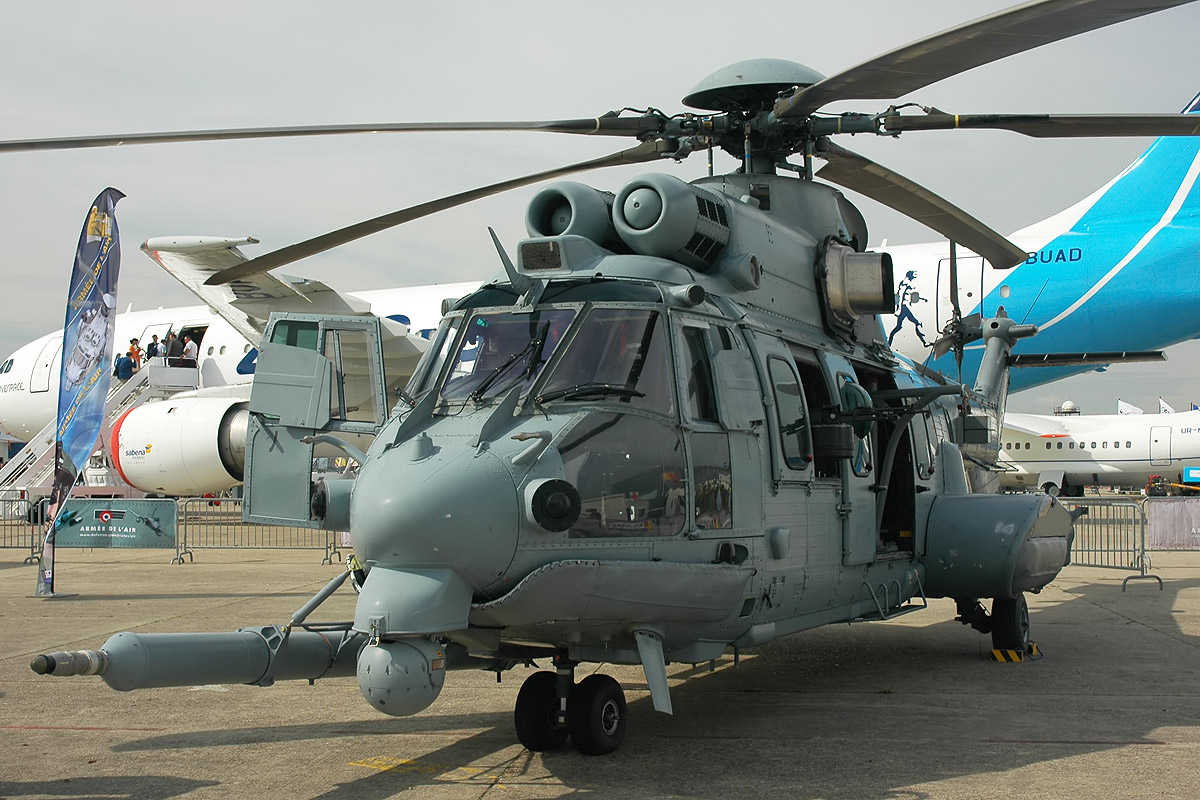
Eurocopter EC725 for RMAF to replace the Sikorsky S-61.

- 1 December – Five of family were killed in the MPV crash at Endau-Mersing road, Johor.
- 3 December – The first batch of the two Eurocopter's EC725 Cougar to the Royal Malaysian Air Force (RMAF).
- 8 December – Hotel Majestic in Kuala Lumpur reopens after 28 years in closure.
- 23 December – Four of family were killed in the car-bus crash at Kuala Terengganu–Kemaman road, Terengganu.
- 24–29 December – Several parts of the east coast Peninsular Malaysia were hit by flash floods. About 11,000 people were evacuated.
- 27–31 December – The Karnival Sayangi Selangor Yakini BN is held at I-City, Shah Alam, Selangor. Other carnival also begin in Dataran Kemerdekaan Shah Alam (Shah Alam Independent Square).
- 28 December – Landslides occurred at Setiawangsa, Kuala Lumpur.

== National Day and Malaysia Day ==
National Day Theme

55 Tahun Merdeka: Janji Ditepati (55 Years of Independence: Promises Fulfilled)

Malaysia Day Theme

Janji Ditepati Rakyat Sejahtera

=== National Day parade ===
Merdeka Square, Kuala Lumpur

=== Himpunan Janji Ditepati (Promises fulfilled gathering) ===
Bukit Jalil National Stadium, Bukit Jalil, Kuala Lumpur

=== Malaysia Day celebrations ===
Lapangan Terbang Lama, Bintulu, Sarawak

== Sports ==
- 24 February–4 March – 2012 Tour de Langkawi.
- 9–16 July — 2012 Sukma Games in Pahang.
- 18 November — 2012 Penang Bridge International Marathon.
- 24 November–22 December – 2012 AFF Suzuki Cup.
- 9–14 December — 2012 Malaysian Paralympiad in Pahang.

== Births ==
- 13 October – Iris Alessandra Alyssa – Actress.

== Deaths ==
- 20 January – Izwan Pilus – Malay singer and television host.
- 27 January – Razali Alias – former Selangor footballer.
- 8 March – Nurul Nadira or Dirang – 5-year-old girl.
- 30 March – Raja Ashman Shah Ibni Sultan Azlan Shah – Raja Kecil Sulong of Perak.
- 2 June – Lee Meng, Malayan Communist Party leader of the "Kepayang Gang" in Perak.
- 19 June – Lam Wah Kwai – Secretary of the First Bureau of the Central Committee of the North Kalimantan Communist Party.
- 21 July – Ismail Hutson – President of Malaysian Zoological Society and veteran actor.
- 15 August – Punch Gunalan (real name Panchacharan Gunalan) – former national badminton champion.
- 4 September – Tan Sri Hamzah Abu Samah – Honorary Life President of Olympic Council of Malaysia.
- 19 September – Tee Hui Yi – Mechanical heart girl.
- 28 September – Abdul Ghani Minhat – Football legend.
- 13 October – Kwek Ho Yao – philanthropist and prominent figure from Johor.
- 2 November – Han Suyin, physician and novelist.
- 4 December – R. Jeyanathan, broadcaster.
- 22 December – Tun Dr Lim Keng Yaik, former Gerakan party president and Minister for Energy, Water and Communications.

== See also ==
- 2012
- 2011 in Malaysia | 2013 in Malaysia
- History of Malaysia
- List of Malaysian films of 2012
