= Malaysia Federal Route 235 =

Road in Malaysia

Federal Route 235
- Jalan Sungai Koyan-Berchang

Route information
- Length: 24.07 km (14.96 mi)

Major junctions
- West end: Sungai Koyan
- FT 102 Ringlet-Sungai Koyan Highway; FT 1503 (1503) Jalan FELDA Sungai Koyan; FT 8 Federal Route 8
- East end: Berchang

Location
- Country: Malaysia
- Primary destinations: Sungai Ular; Kampung Bukit Betong; Lubuk Kulit

Highway system
- Highways in Malaysia; Expressways; Federal; State

Federal Route 235, or Jalan Sungai Koyan-Berchang (formerly Pahang State Route C158), is a federal road in Pahang, Malaysia. The roads connects Sungai Koyan in the west to Berchang near Kuala Lipis in the east. It is also a main route to Cameron Highlands from Kuala Lipis. The route starts at Sungai Koyan.

In 2012, the highway was gazetted as Federal Route 235.

== Features ==
The Federal Route 235 was built under the JKR R5 road standard, allowing a maximum speed limit of up to 90 km/h.

== List of junctions and towns ==
Km	Exit	Junctions	To	Remarks
FT 235; 0		Sungai Koyan	West; FT 102 Ringlet-Sungai Koyan Highway; FT 102 Cameron Highlands; FT 59 Tapah; FT 1 Ipoh FT 1503 (1503) Jalan FELDA Sungai Koyan North; FT 1503 (1503) Kuala Medang South; FT 8 Raub; FT 8 Bentong; East Coast Expressway FT 2 AH141 Kuantan	4-way intersections
FT 235 Jalan Sungai Koyan–Berchang; Start/End of road JKR border limit
		FELDA Sungai Koyan 1		
		Sungai Paga bridge		
		FELDA Sungai Koyan 2		
		Sungai Ular		
		Kampung Tepuai		
		Kampung Keledek		
		Jalan Bukit Betong	North; C158 Jalan Bukit Betong; Bukit Betong; Bukit Yon; Bukit Kota	3-way intersections
		Kampung Tanjung Jambu		
		Sungai Telang bridge		
		Jalan Telang	West; C161 Jalan Telang; Lubuk Kulit; Telang	3-way intersections
FT 235 Jalan Sungai Koyan–Berchang; Start/End of road JKR border limit
FT 8 Kuala Lumpur–Kota Bharu Highway; Start/End of highway JKR border limit
		Berchang	Northwest; FT 8 Padang Tengku; FT 8 Gua Musang; FT 8 Kuala Krai; FT 8 Kota Bharu South; FT 8 Kuala Lipis; FT 8 Benta; FT 8 Raub; FT 8 Bentong; North–South Expressway Southern Route FT 2 AH141 Kuala Lumpur	3-way intersections
