= Malaysia Federal Route 102 =

Road in Malaysia

Federal Route 102
- Pos Betau–Lembah Bertam Road

Route information
- Maintained by Malaysian Public Works Department
- Length: 79.23 km (49.23 mi)
- Existed: 1999–present
- History: Completed in 2010

Major junctions
- West end: Ringlet, Cameron Highlands
- FT 59 Federal Route 59; FT 235 Federal Route 235; FT 1503 Federal Route 1503
- East end: FELDA Sungai Koyan, Lipis

Location
- Country: Malaysia
- Primary destinations: Tanah Rata, Brinchang, Ringlet, Tapah, Pos Betau, Sungai Koyan, Raub, Kuala Lipis

Highway system
- Highways in Malaysia; Expressways; Federal; State

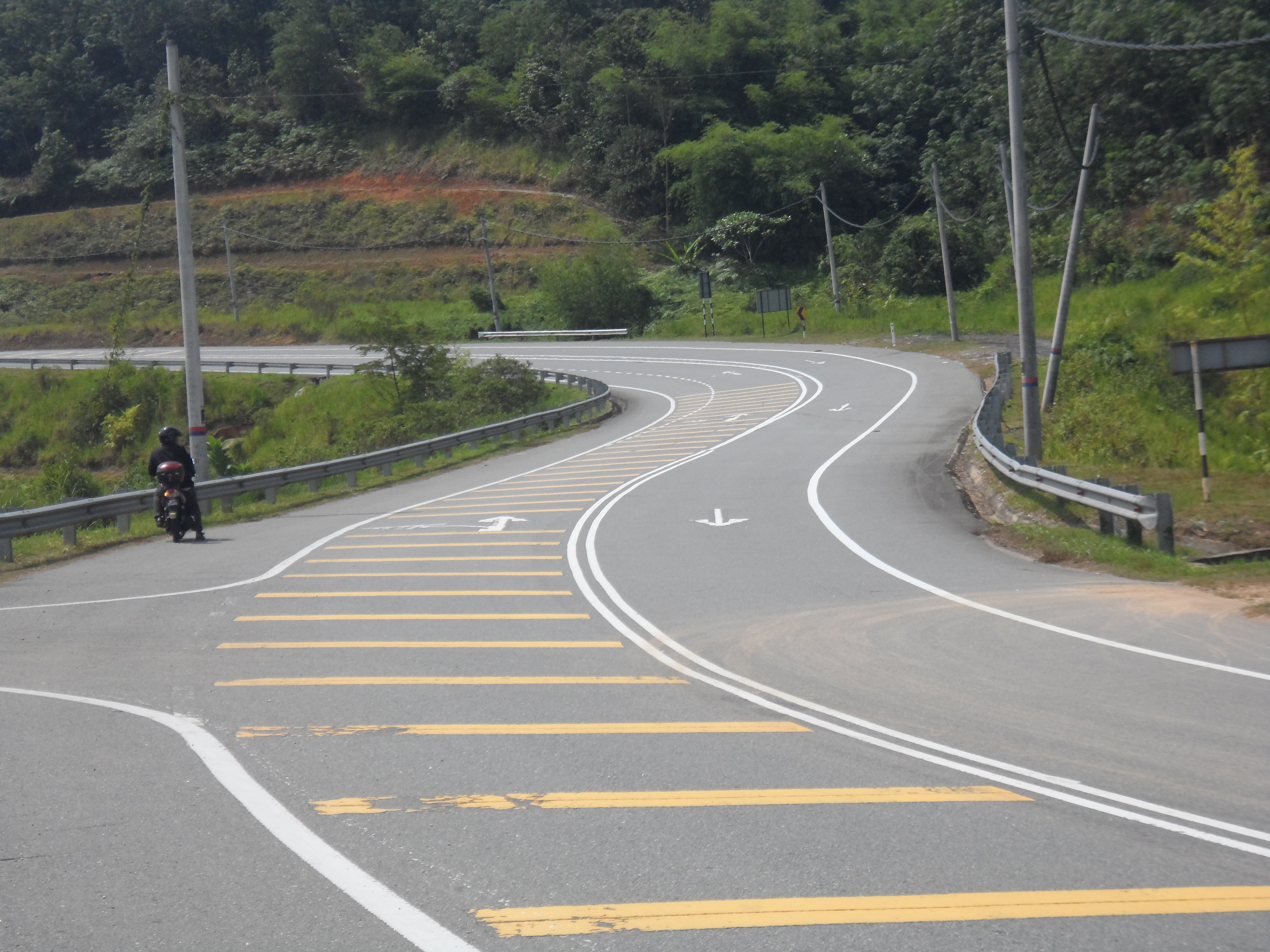
Ringlet–Sungai Koyan Highway (Federal Route 102) proceeding uphill at Pos Betau

The Federal Route 102, also known as Pos Betau–Lembah Bertam Road (Malay: Jalan Pos Betau–Lembah Bertam), is a 79.1-kilometre (49.2 mi) federal highway in Pahang, Malaysia. It is built as the third access road to the district of Cameron Highlands, Pahang after the Federal Route 59 and 185. The completion of the highway makes it possible for Pahangite motorists to visit Cameron Highlands without leaving the state of Pahang.

== Route background ==
The Kilometre Zero of the Federal Route 102 is located at Ringlet, Cameron Highlands.

== History ==
Cameron Highlands used to be only accessible via the old Route 59 from Tapah, Perak. The Second East–West Highway FT185 became the most popular alternative to the narrow, winding FT59 old road. Despite the completion of the newer FT185 highway, motorists from Pahang who wished to go to Cameron Highlands had to access the hill station from the outside of Pahang.

The study of the need for a new direct highway to Cameron Highlands within Pahang was done in 1996. Construction started in 1999 and the highway was constructed in stages until it was fully completed in March 2010. The Federal Route 102 was constructed at the total cost of RM806 million.

When completed, the journey from Kuantan to Cameron Highlands has been shortened by 80 km compared to the same journey via the Second East-West Highway from Gua Musang, Kelantan.

== Features ==
At most sections, the Federal Route 102 was built under the JKR R5 road standard, allowing maximum speed limit of up to 90 km/h.

== Junction lists ==
The entire route is located in Pahang.

Legend:

- I/C - Interchange, I/S - Intersection, RSA - Rest and service area, OBR - Overhead bridge restaurant, R/R - Restaurant and rest plaza, L/B - Layby, V/P - Vista point, TN - tunnel, T/P - Toll plaza, BR - Bridge
- C - Cloverleaf, S - Stack, T-A - Trumpet-A, T-B - Trumpet-B, DT - Directional-T/Y, SDT - Semi-Directional-T/Y, P-Y - Partial-Y, D - Diamond, P-C - Partial cloverleaf, D-D - Diverging diamond, D-R - Direct ramp

District	Location	km	mi	Name	Destinations	Notes
Cameron Highland	Ringlet	0.0	0.0	Ringlet	FT 59 Malaysia Federal Route 59 – Tanah Rata, Brinchang, Tringkap, Kampung Raja, Gua Musang, Simpang Pulai, Ipoh, Lata Iskandar Waterfall, Kuala Woh Waterfall, Tapah, Kampar, Bidor, Kuala Lumpur	T-junctions
Cameron Highland	Ringlet			Sungai Ringlet bridge		
Cameron Highland	Bertam Valley			Bertam Valley	Bertam Valley Town Centre	Junctions
Cameron Highland	Bertam Valley			Sungai Bertam bridge		
Cameron Highland	Bertam Valley			Kuala Boh	Kampung Kuala Boh	T-junctions
Cameron Highland	Bertam Valley			Kampung Manson		
Cameron Highland	Bertam Valley			Sungai Bertam bridge		
Cameron Highland	Ulu Jelai			Kampung Leryar	Kampung Leryar	T-junctions
Cameron Highland	Ulu Jelai			Ulu Jelai Hydroelectric Dam and Power Station Lookout		
Cameron Highland	Ulu Jelai			Ulu Jelai Hydroelectric Dam and Power Station	Ulu Jelai Hydroelectric Dam and Power Station	T-junctions
Cameron Highland	Ulu Jelai			Ulu Jelai Hydroelectric Dam and Power Station; Main Access	Ulu Jelai Hydroelectric Dam and Power Station, Kampung Telanok, Kampung Lemoi	Crossroads
Cameron Highland	Ulu Jelai			Sungai Lemoi bridge		
Lipis	Betau			Viaduct		
Lipis	Betau			Pos Betau; Betau Rest and Service Area		
Lipis	Betau			Sungai Jelai Kecil bridge		
Lipis	Betau			Pos Betau	Pos Betau	T-junctions
Lipis	Betau			Pos Betau; Betau Health Clinic	Betau Health Clinic	T-junctions
Lipis	Sungai Koyan	79.00	49.09	FELDA Sungai Koyan	FT 235 Malaysia Federal Route 235 – Berchang, Padang Tengku, Kuala Lipis; FT 1503 Jalan FELDA Sungai Koyan – Kuala Medang, Batu Malim, Batu Talam, Cheroh, Raub, Bentong	T-junctions
1.000 mi = 1.609 km; 1.000 km = 0.621 mi
