= Ulu Jelai Power Station =

Hydroelectric power station in Cameron Highlands, Pahang, Malaysia

Ulu Jelai Power Station Stesen Janakuasa Ulu Jelai
- Interactive map of Ulu Jelai Power Station; Stesen Janakuasa Ulu Jelai
- Country: Malaysia
- Location: Cameron Highlands, Pahang
- Coordinates: 4°27′1″N 101°35′7″E
- Purpose: Power, flood control
- Status: Operational
- Construction began: March 1, 2011
- Opening date: 2016
- Construction cost: RM2.4 billion
- Owner: Tenaga Nasional Berhad

Dam and spillways
- Type of dam: Gravity dam
- Impounds: Bertam river
- Height: 88 m (289 ft)
- Length: 500 m (1,640 ft)
- Width (crest): 3 m (10 ft)
- Width (base): 115 m (377 ft)
- Spillway capacity: 2,300 m^{3}/s (81,000 cu ft/s)

Reservoir
- Creates: Susu reservoir
- Catchment area: 0.1 km^{2} (0.039 sq mi)
- Normal elevation: 540 m (1,772 ft)

Ulu Jelai Power Station
- Commission date: 2016
- Type: Underground
- Hydraulic head: Rated: 330 m (1,083 ft); Maximum: 335 m (1,099 ft)
- Turbines: 2 × 191 MW vertical Francis-type
- Installed capacity: 382 MW
- Capacity factor: 8%
- Annual generation: 282 GWh (1,020 TJ) (estimated)

The Ulu Jelai Power Station (Malay: Stesen Janakuasa Ulu Jelai) is a hydroelectric power station located in the district of Cameron Highlands, Pahang, Malaysia. It is one of the entry point projects under the Economic Transformation Programme.

== Location ==
The project is located approximately 150 km north of Kuala Lumpur. The nearest town is Ringlet, 40 km away. The power station is accessible from Federal Route 102, connecting the towns of Ringlet and Sungai Koyan. It is located within Ulu Jelai and Bukit Jerut forest reserves, near Cameron Highlands-Lipis district border.

== Specifications ==
The power station has a maximum generating capacity of 382 MW. Water from 3 rivers - the Sungai Bertam, Sungai Telom and Sungai Lemoi is used for electricity generation. A dam is built to impound the Sungai Bertam. Weirs and diversion tunnels are built on the Sungai Telom and Sungai Lemoi to divert water into the main reservoir at Sungai Bertam. From the reservoir, water is channeled into a series of tunnels 15 km-long to generate electricity before being released back into Sungai Telom.

The power cavern houses 2 units of Francis turbines each with a generating capacity of 191 MW.

== Construction ==
TM-Salini Consortium has been appointed as the main contractor. Construction commenced in March 2011. The 88m-high roller compacted concrete (RCC) dam on Sungai Bertam was built after Sungai Bertam has been successfully diverted. The RCC mix is of low cementitious content and aggregates were sourced from a nearby quarry.

All tunnels and caverns were excavated using drill and blast method except for the diversion tunnels which utilised a 3m-diameter tunnel boring machine. Lining of tunnels depended upon the rock conditions and water pressure - concrete and steel are used as lining materials. The surge shaft was excavated using the raised boring technique. Unit 1 is expected to be commissioned in December 2015 while Unit 2 in March 2016.

The construction of this project resulted in the relocation of 3 orang Asli villages - Kampung Susu, Kampung Tiat and Kampung Pinang.

The reservoir impounding started on 18 January 2016 and reach the full supply level on 16 May 2016.

Unit 2 was the first unit being commissioned due to some issues with the commissioning of Unit 1. Commercial operation of Unit 2 was at 0000 hours on 15 August 2016.

== Issues ==
Sedimentation is a major issue for Sungai Bertam and Sungai Telom due to uncontrolled clearing of land. A check dam has been constructed upstream of the main reservoir on Sungai Bertam. The check dam is able to reduce the amount of sediment entering the reservoir and prolonging the reservoir life. A desanding system has been constructed at the intake of Sungai Telom for the same purpose.

== See also ==
- List of power stations in Malaysia
- Environmental concerns with electricity generation
- Environmental issues in Malaysia
