= Ismail Hutson =

Dato' Ismail Hutson
- Born: Ismail bin Haji Omar; 1938; Selangor
- Died: July 21, 2012 (aged 73–74); Subang Jaya, Selangor
- Occupation(s): Actor, President of the Malaysian Zoological Society
- Years active: 1978–2012
- Spouse(s): Zaiton Osman; Hafidzah Khasbullah
- Children: 7

Dato' Ismail Haji Omar (1938 – July 21, 2012) also known as Dato' Ismail Hutson, was a popular movie and television actor in Malaysia. He also served as the Veteran Artistes (Acting) Welfare Association President for the last twenty years of his life, and was also the President of the Malaysian Zoological Society at the time of his death. He resided in Taman Nusa Subang Bistari in Subang Jaya, which is in the Klang Valley of Selangor.

== Death ==
Hutson, suffering from a high fever, died due to heart complications on July 21, 2012, at Sime Darby Medical Centre Subang Jaya. He was surrounded by his two wife Zaiton Osman, Hafidzah Khasbullah and his seven children when he died.

== Partial filmography ==
Hutson's better known movies in the Malaysian cinema include:

- Dayang Suhana (1978),
- Tujuh Biang Keladi (1984),
- Hantu Siang (1986),
- Our Love (originally titled Cinta Kita) (1995),
- Layar Lara (1998), and
- Mr. Cinderella 2 (2002).
