= 2013 Genting Highlands bus crash =

Road accident in Malaysia

Details
- Date: 21 August 2013
- Location: Malaysia

Statistics
- Deaths: 37 (including the driver)
- Injured: 16 (5 critical)

The 2013 Genting Highlands bus crash was the deadliest road accident to occur in Malaysia. 37 passengers were killed, and 16 others were injured in the crash which took place near Chin Swee Temple, Genting Highlands, Pahang. It occurred on 21 August 2013 at 2:15 pm, when the bus carrying 53 passengers lost control as it was going down an incline and it plunged into a deep ravine at about 60 metres at the kilometre 3.5 of the Genting Sempah-Genting Highlands Highway. The bus driver, Lim Kok Ho, died on the spot.

The site of crash was about 10m after an escape ramp directly in the path of the bus.

An independent review of the crash cited six contributing factors, including excessive speed and poor bus maintenance.
