= Chronicle of Malaysia =

Book about Malaysia

- Cover for Chronicle of Malaysia
- Editor: Philip Mathews
- Published: 2007 Editions Didier Millet
- Publication place: Malaysia
- Media type: Hardback
- Pages: 384

The Chronicle of Malaysia gives an account of Malaysia from January 1957 to 31 August 2007. Published in conjunction with the 50th anniversary of Malaysian Independence, this book provides an account of major news events that occurred during this 50-year period. It covers the events as they unfolded in an eye-witness manner as if they were newspaper stories written at that time. These key events include the raising of the Malayan flag, the Emergency, the formation of Malaysia, the 1969 riots, political upheavals, the financial crisis, judicial cases of note, sport events, cultural developments, and miscellaneous aspects of daily life.

The Chronicle was launched on 5 November 2007 by Prime Minister Abdullah Ahmad Badawi.
