= Bertam Valley =

Bertam Valley Lembah Bertam
- Settlement of Cameron Highlands
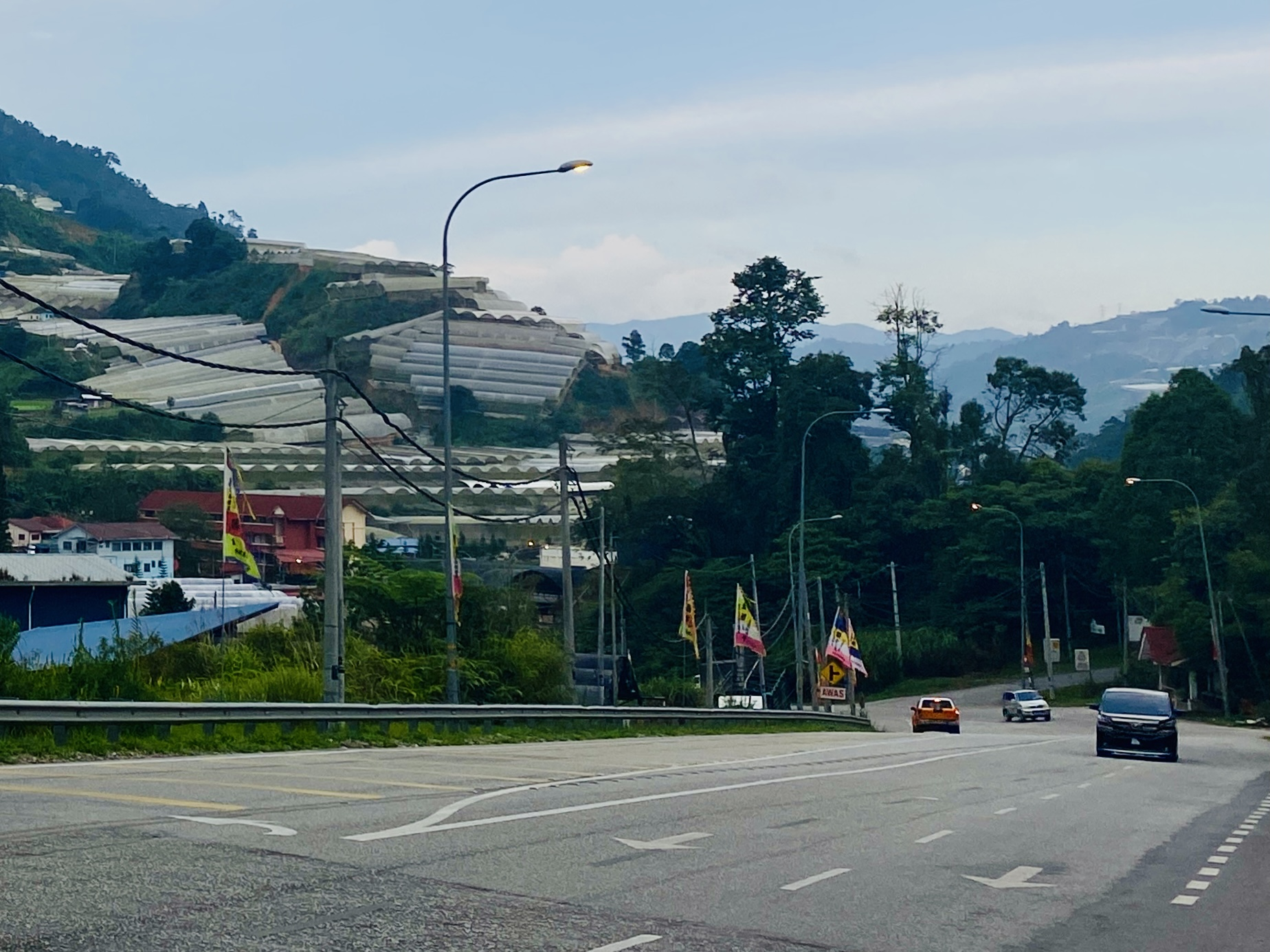

- Location in Pahang Location in Malaysia
- Coordinates: 4°25′N 101°24′E
- Country: Malaysia
- State: Pahang
- District: Cameron Highlands

Bertam Valley (Malay: Lembah Bertam) is an agricultural-based village in southern Cameron Highlands, Pahang, Malaysia, located close to the town of Ringlet. The entry to the village is located at Ringlet. On one side of the village is the Ulu Jelai Power Station, on the headwaters of the Jelai River, a left tributary of the Pahang River.

Federal Route FT 102, the main route linking the highlands to Kuala Lipis and the rest of Pahang, passes through Bertam Valley.
