= Ringlet, Malaysia =

Town of the Cameron Highlands, Pahang, Malaysia

Ringlet
- Settlement of Cameron Highlands
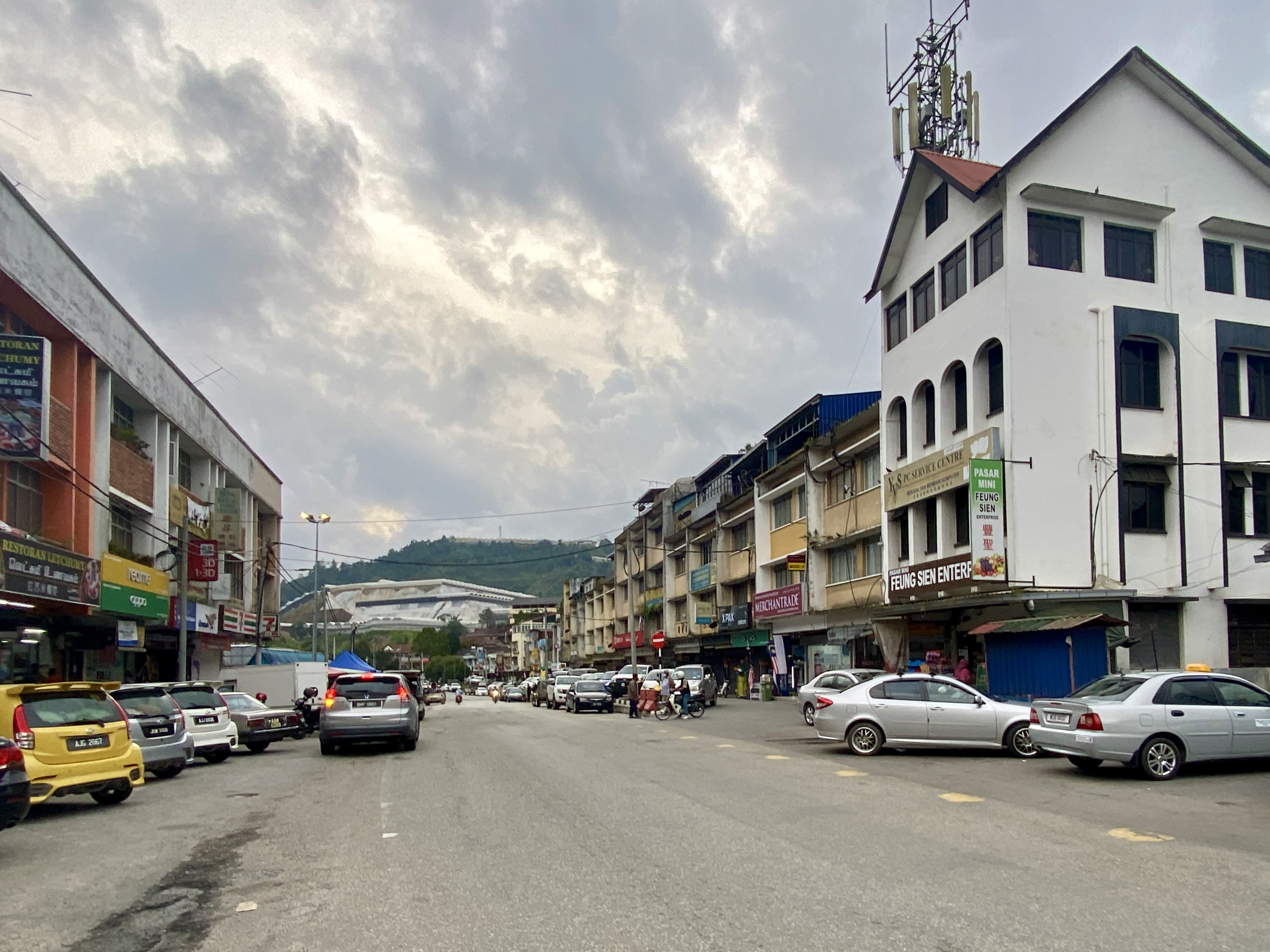
- The main street (Federal Route 59) that traverses Ringlet.
- Location in Malaysia
- Ringlet in Pahang Ringlet (Malaysia) Ringlet (Southeast Asia)
- Coordinates: 4°24′49.03″N 101°23′01.46″E
- Country: Malaysia
- State: Pahang
- District: Cameron Highlands District

Government
  - Type: District council
  - Body: Cameron Highlands District Council

Population (2014)
  - Total: 11,575
- Time zone: UTC+8 (MST)
- Postal code: 39xxx
- Area code(s): 06-5xxxxxxx
- Vehicle registration: C

Ringlet is the southernmost town of the Cameron Highlands, Pahang, Malaysia. It is situated close to the state border with Perak.

== Geography ==
Situated at an altitude of 1,135 metres above sea level (3,723 ft), Ringlet is a hub of Malaysia's vegetable farming and international flower farming sector. The town contains some other small villages such as Bertam Valley, Boh and Habu Height.

== Infrastructure ==
=== Education ===
SJK (T) Ringlet, SJK (C) Cameron, SJK (C) Bertam Valley and SMK Ringlet are some of the educational institutions that are located near Ringlet.

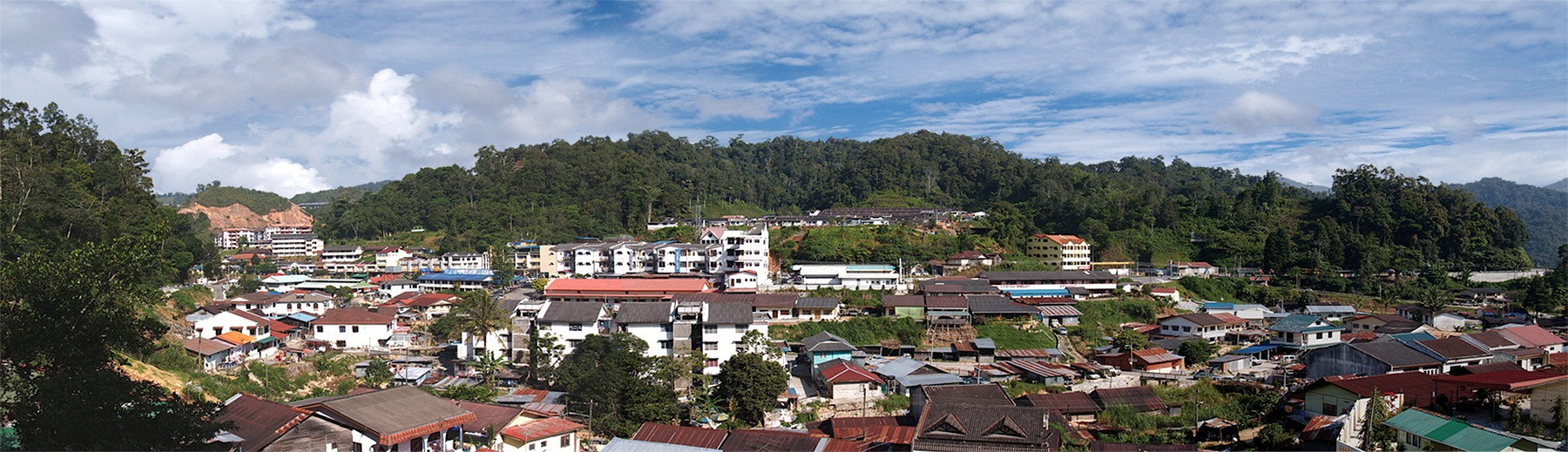
The township of Ringlet, Malaysia (c. 2012)

=== By road ===
Ringlet is served by Federal Routes FT 59 and FT 102, respectively linking the town to Tapah in the south, as well as the rest of Cameron Highlands, and Kuala Lipis in the east.
