= 2011 in Malaysia =

- Decades: 1990s; 2000s; 2010s; 2020s
- See also: Other events of 2011; History of Malaysia • Timeline • Years

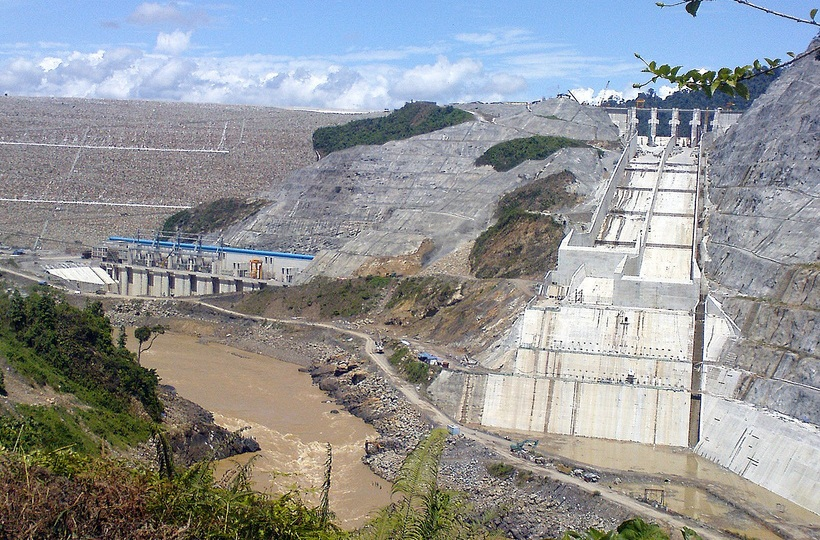
The Bakun Hydroelectric Dam, Sarawak, the largest dam in Malaysia and Southeast Asia.

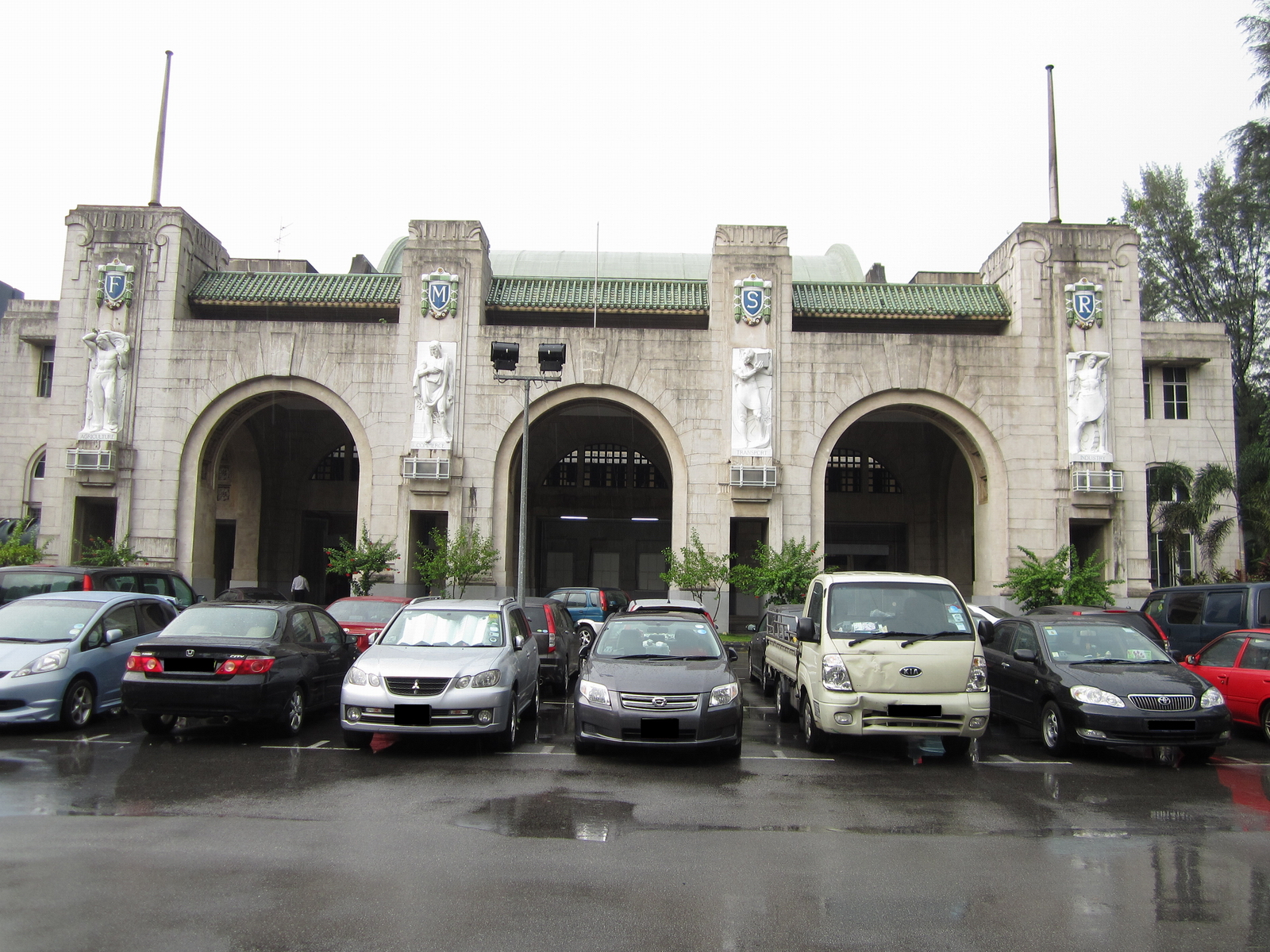
Tanjong Pagar railway station in Singapore owned by Malaysian KTMB was relocated to the Woodlands Train Checkpoint on 1 July.

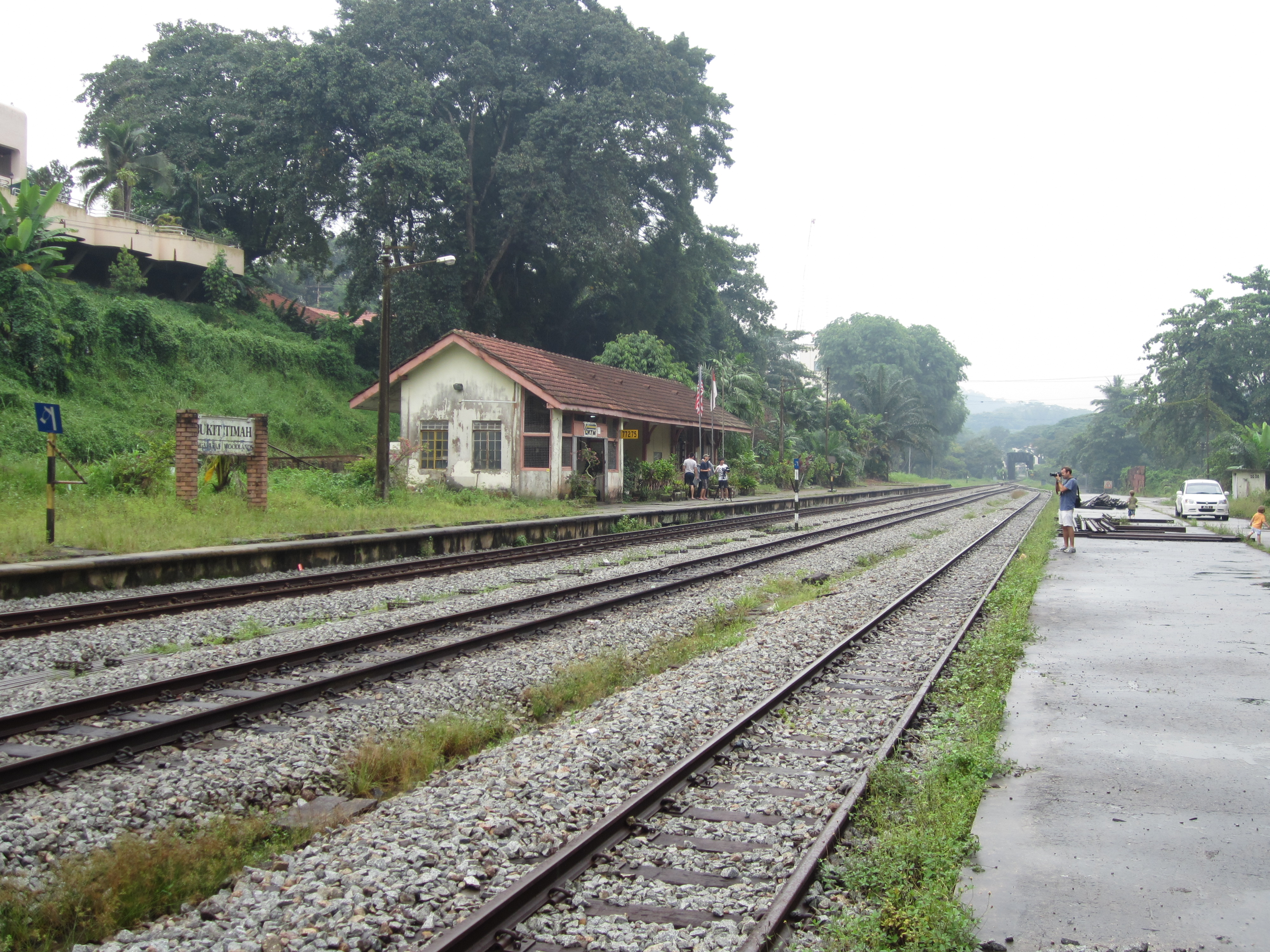
Bukit Timah railway station

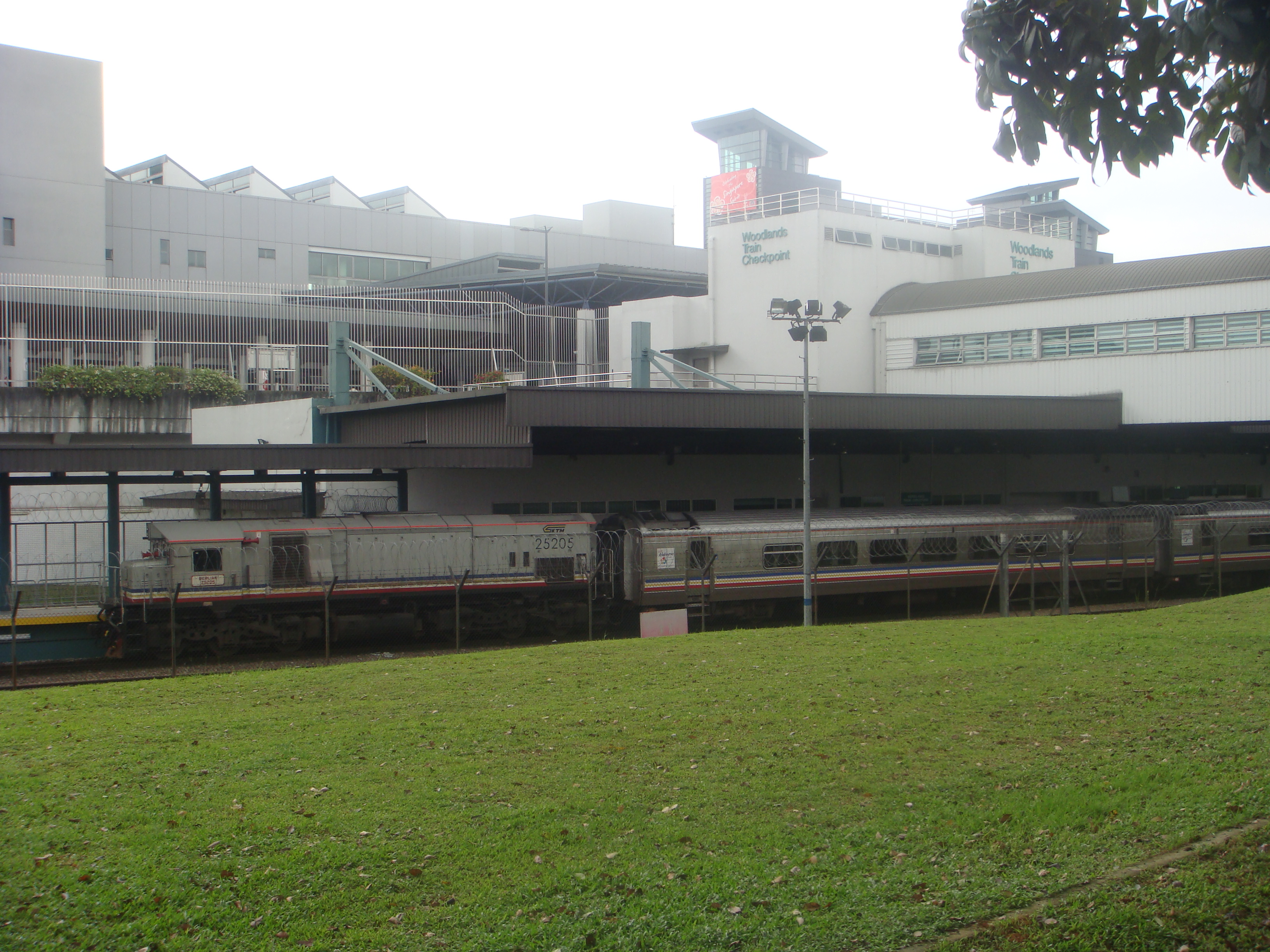
Woodlands Train Checkpoint, a new Malaysian KTMB railway terminus beginning on 1 July.

2011 in Malaysia is the 54th anniversary of Malaysia's independence.

== Incumbents ==
=== Federal level ===
- Yang di-Pertuan Agong:
  - Sultan Mizan Zainal Abidin of Terengganu (until 12 December)
  - Sultan Abdul Halim Mu'adzam Shah of Kedah (from 13 December)
- Raja Permaisuri Agong:
  - Sultanah Nur Zahirah of Terengganu (until 12 December)
  - Sultanah Haminah Hamidun of Kedah (from 13 December)
- Deputy Yang di-Pertuan Agong:
  - Sultan Abdul Halim Mu'adzam Shah of Kedah (until 12 December)
  - Sultan Muhammad V of Kelantan (from 13 December)
- Prime Minister: Dato' Sri Mohammad Najib Abdul Razak
- Deputy Prime Minister: Tan Sri Dato' Haji Muhyiddin Yassin
- President of the Dewan Negara: Tan Sri Abu Zahar Ujang
- Speaker of the Dewan Rakyat: Tan Sri Datuk Seri Panglima Pandikar Amin Mulia
- Chief Justice:
  - Tun Dato' Seri Zaki Azmi (until 9 September)
  - Tun Arifin Zakaria (12 September)

=== State level ===
- Johor:
  - Sultan of Johor: Sultan Ibrahim
  - Menteri Besar of Johor: Abdul Ghani Othman
- Kedah:
  - Sultan of Kedah: (Council of Regency of Kedah from 13 December)
    - Tunku Annuar (chairman)
    - Tunku Sallehuddin (Members I)
    - Tunku Abdul Hamid Thani (Members II)
    - Tunku Puteri Intan Safinaz (Members III)
  - Menteri Besar of Kedah: Azizan Abdul Razak
- Kelantan:
  - Sultan of Kelantan: Sultan Muhammad V
  - Menteri Besar of Kelantan: Nik Abdul Aziz Nik Mat
- Perlis:
  - Raja of Perlis: Tuanku Syed Sirajuddin
  - Menteri Besar of Perlis: Md Isa Sabu
- Perak:
  - Sultan of Perak: Sultan Azlan Muhibbuddin Shah
  - Menteri Besar of Perak: Zambry Abdul Kadir
- Pahang:
  - Sultan of Pahang: Sultan Haji Ahmad Shah Al-Musta'in Billah
  - Menteri Besar of Pahang: Adnan Yaakob
- Selangor:
  - Sultan of Selangor: Sultan Sharafuddin Idris Shah
  - Menteri Besar of Selangor: Abdul Khalid Ibrahim
- Terengganu:
  - Sultan of Terengganu: Tengku Muhammad Ismail (Regent until 12 December)
  - Menteri Besar of Terengganu: Ahmad Said
- Negeri Sembilan:
  - Yang di-Pertuan Besar of Negeri Sembilan: Tuanku Muhriz
  - Menteri Besar of Negeri Sembilan: Mohamad Hasan
- Penang:
  - Governor of Penang: Tun Abdul Rahman Abbas
  - Chief Minister of Penang: Lim Guan Eng
- Malacca:
  - Governor of Malacca: Tun Mohd Khalil Yaakob
  - Chief Minister of Malacca: Mohd Ali Rustam
- Sarawak:
  - Governor of Sarawak: Tun Abang Muhammad Salahuddin
  - Chief Minister of Sarawak: Abdul Taib Mahmud
- Sabah:
  - Governor of Sabah: Tun Juhar Mahiruddin
  - Chief Minister of Sabah: Musa Aman

== Events ==
=== January ===
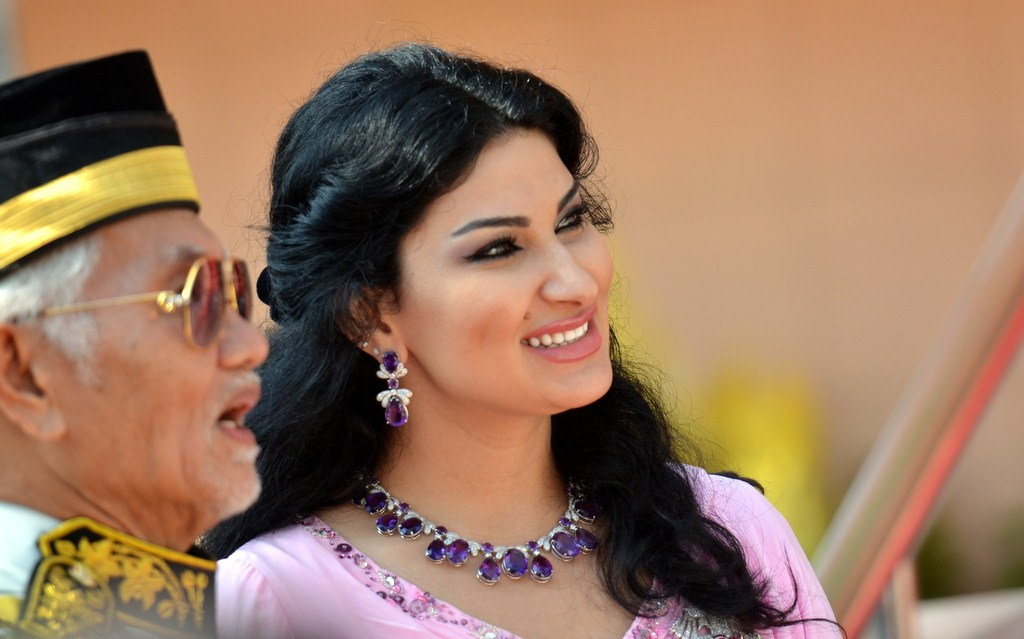
Taib Mahmud and his Syrian wife Ragad Waleed Alkurdi in 2011

- 1 January – The Bandar Tasik Selatan Integrated Transport Terminal (Terminal Bersepadu Selatan) is opened for public.
- 1–17 January – Several parts of East Coast Peninsular Malaysia were hit by flash floods.
- 11 January – An AirAsia passenger plane carrying 130 passengers and crew skidded off the runway at Kuching International Airport, Sarawak.
- 16 January – Sarawak's Chief Minister, Abdul Taib Mahmud marries Syrian lady, Ragad Waleed Alkurdi.
- 17 January – The opening of Batang Tiga Police Station Gallery in Tanjung Kling, Malacca.
- 21 January – Malaysian naval commandos rescued 23 crew members of the MT Bunga Laurel oil tanker which was hijacked by Somali pirates in the Gulf of Aden.
- 22 January – Three young victims are murdered by a group of unknown motorists in Masjid Tanah, Malacca.
- 28 January – The new anthem and lyrics for Federal Territory is launched.
- 28 January–3 February – Several parts of Southern Peninsular Malaysia were hit by flash floods.
- 29 January – The government announces that there will be no toll hike for Kuala Lumpur–Karak Expressway and East Coast Expressway (Phase 1) for every five years.
- 30 January – 2011 Tenang by-election. Barisan Nasional (BN) candidate, Mohd Azahar wins this by-elections with a majority of 3,707 votes beating PAS candidate Normala Sudirman.
- 30 January–6 February – Malaysia at the 2011 Asian Winter Games in Almaty and Astana, Kazakhstan.

=== February ===
- 2 February
  - The government decides to bring Malaysian students by air or sea out of Egypt due to the worsening anti-government uprising in that country.
  - Three Royal Malaysian Air Force (RMAF)'s C-130 Hercules leaves for Egypt in the Ops Piramid (Operation Pyramid) mission to bring home Malaysian students from the trouble country.
- 7 February – Ops Piramid mission successful. About 7,000 Malaysians have been evacuated from Egypt since it was started on 2 February.
- 14 February – The Royal Commission of Inquiry on Teoh Beng Hock's Death begins hearing at Kuala Lumpur Courts Complex, Jalan Duta.
- 19 February – Protests in Bahrain, Libya, Algeria and Yemen. Malaysian citizens who are registered with the Malaysian embassies in Algiers, Algeria, Manama, Bahrain, Tripoli, Libya and Sanaa, Yemen are all reported safe and none of them are involved in the riots.
- 22 February – Prime Minister Mohammad Najib Abdul Razak visits Turkey for the first time and meets its prime minister Recep Tayyip Erdoğan.
- 27 February – More than 109 protesters of the HINDRAF (Hindu Rights Action Force) members were arrested by police for allegedly taking part in an illegal demonstration to protest the novel Interlok in Kuala Lumpur, Malaysia.

=== March ===
- 2 March – Malaysian Prime Minister Mohammad Najib Abdul Razak visits Australia for the first time and meets with Australian Prime Minister Julia Gillard.
- 6 March – Merlimau and Kerdau by-elections. Barisan Nasional (BN) win in both by-elections. In Merlimau, Malacca. BN candidate, Roslan Ahmad wins with a majority of 3,643 votes beating PAS candidate Yuhaizad Abdullah. In Kerdau, Pahang. BN candidate, Syed Ibrahim Syed Ahmad wins with a majority of 2,724 votes beating PAS candidate, Hassanuddin Salim.
- 11–12 March – Following the Great East Japan earthquake and tsunami with the subsequent of Fukushima nuclear fallout, Malaysian citizens who are registered with the Malaysian embassy in Tokyo, Japan are all reported safe. Malaysia sends a 15-members of search and rescue team (SMART), with medical officers and 6 tracker dogs, to tsunami-hit Japan.
- 13 March – World's no.1 badminton player, Lee Chong Wei wins All England titles for the second time beating China's Lin Dan in the finals at Birmingham, England.
- 20 March – An 11-year-old boy, Muhammad Naquiddin was electrocuted to death when he touched a lamppost at a playground at Batu Tiga, Selangor.
- 21 March
  - Five silat masters were killed when the van they were travelling in skidded and rammed into a tree at Pendang, Kedah.
  - Tengku Ampuan Bariah of Terengganu (1979–1998), the mother of the Yang di-Pertuan Agong, Sultan Mizan Zainal Abidin of Terengganu died at Seri Kota Medical Centre in Klang, Selangor. Her body was flown back to Terengganu and was laid to rest at the Royal Mausoleum near Al-Muktafi Billah Shah Mosque, Kuala Terengganu, Terengganu. Terengganu declares a 40 days of mourning period.
- 28 March – Several parts of East Coast Peninsular Malaysia including Terengganu was hit by flash floods.

=== April ===
- 2 April – The Malaysian Anti-Corruption Commission (MACC) arrested 62 Royal Malaysian Customs Department officers of various ranks and posts under the 3b operation for alleged involvement in corruption, money laundering and other offences.
- 6 April
  - A Royal Malaysian Customs Department Selangor state assistant director, Ahmad Sarbani Mohamed, 56 was found dead on the first floor of the Federal Territory Malaysian Anti-Corruption Commission (MACC) office in Jalan Cochrane, Kuala Lumpur, Malaysia.
  - The remains of national hero Mohammed Abdul Lalil @ Jalil, who was killed in a plane crash at Gua Musang, Kelantan during the Malayan Emergency on 25 August 1950 was brought back to Muar, Johor and was buried in Bukit Treh Muslim Cemetery.
- 11 April – A pilot was killed in a helicopter crash in Sibu, Sarawak.
- 16 April
  - Reopening of the Pudu Sentral bus terminal in Kuala Lumpur.
  - 2011 Sarawak state election. Barisan Nasional (BN) retains its two-thirds majority in the 71-seat state assembly. Abdul Taib Mahmud sworn in as Chief Minister of Sarawak.
- 20 April – Canadian teen singer, Justin Bieber performs his concert in Malaysia for the first time at Stadium Merdeka, Kuala Lumpur.
- 27 April
  - Chinese Premier, Wen Jiabao visits Malaysia for the second time and attend the Malaysia-China Economic, Trade and Investment Forum in Kuala Lumpur.
  - Ten Malaysians are arrested at the Auckland International Airport in Auckland, New Zealand for trying to smuggle in methamphetamine worth NZ$10mil (RM24mil) in their shoes.
- 29 April – Datuk Shazryl Eskay Abdullah performed the sumpah laknat (oath-cum-curse) oath at Amru Al-As Mosque in Bandar Baru Sentul, Kuala Lumpur, Malaysia by swearing in God's name that the Opposition Leader, Dato' Seri Anwar Ibrahim is the man featured in the sex video on 21 February 2011, that was recently shown to journalists.

=== May ===
- 5 May – Lesotho prime minister, Pakalitha Mosisili visits Malaysia and meets the prime minister, Mohammad Najib Abdul Razak in Putrajaya, Malaysia.
- 10 May – Three people were killed and five others were injured in the 11-vehicle pile-up at the t-junctions in Bahau, Negeri Sembilan.
- 17 May – The toll collections of the East–West Link Expressway from Salak Interchange to Taman Connaught Interchange is abolished.
- 21 May – 16 people mostly 15 children and a caretaker of an orphanage were killed in a landslide caused by heavy rains at the Children's Hidayah Madrasah Al-Taqwa orphanage in FELCRA Semungkis, Hulu Langat, Selangor.
- 27 May – The biggest National Youth Day celebrations, Hari Belia Negara is held in Putrajaya, Malaysia.

=== June ===
- 4 June – Malaysian football coach, K. Rajagopal and the late goalkeeper, R. Arumugam aka "Spiderman" were awarded Panglima Jasa Negara (PJN) which carried title "Datuk" by Yang di-Pertuan Agong
- 5 June – Mohammad Najib Abdul Razak visits Kazakhstan for the first time and meets its president Nursultan Nazarbayev in the capital Astana.
- 10 June – The Sungai Johor Bridge on the Senai–Desaru Expressway, Johor, the longest river bridge in Malaysia is opened for public for the first time.
- 22 June – The Kedai Rakyat 1Malaysia (KR1M) convenience store is unveiled by the Prime Minister, Mohammad Najib Abdul Razak.
- 23 June – A 124-page report by the Royal Commission of Inquiry on Teoh Beng Hock's Death is presented to the Yang di-Pertuan Agong, Sultan Mizan Zainal Abidin of Terengganu at Istana Terengganu, Kuala Lumpur, Malaysia.
- 24 June – AirAsia places the largest single order in commercial aviation history, purchasing 200 Airbus A320neo jetliners.
- 25 June – A family of three, including a baby boy, died in an early morning fire at Heng Guan Garden, Matang, Kuching, Sarawak.
- 26 June – Police arrest 31 members of the Parti Sosialis Malaysia (PSM) including Sungai Siput Member of Parliament Dr. Michael Jeyakumar Devaraj in Penang in relation to the 9 July Bersih 2.0 rally.
- 28 June – The Perdana Lake Gardens (Taman Tasik Perdana) is renamed Perdana Botanical Gardens (Taman Botanik Perdana).

=== July ===
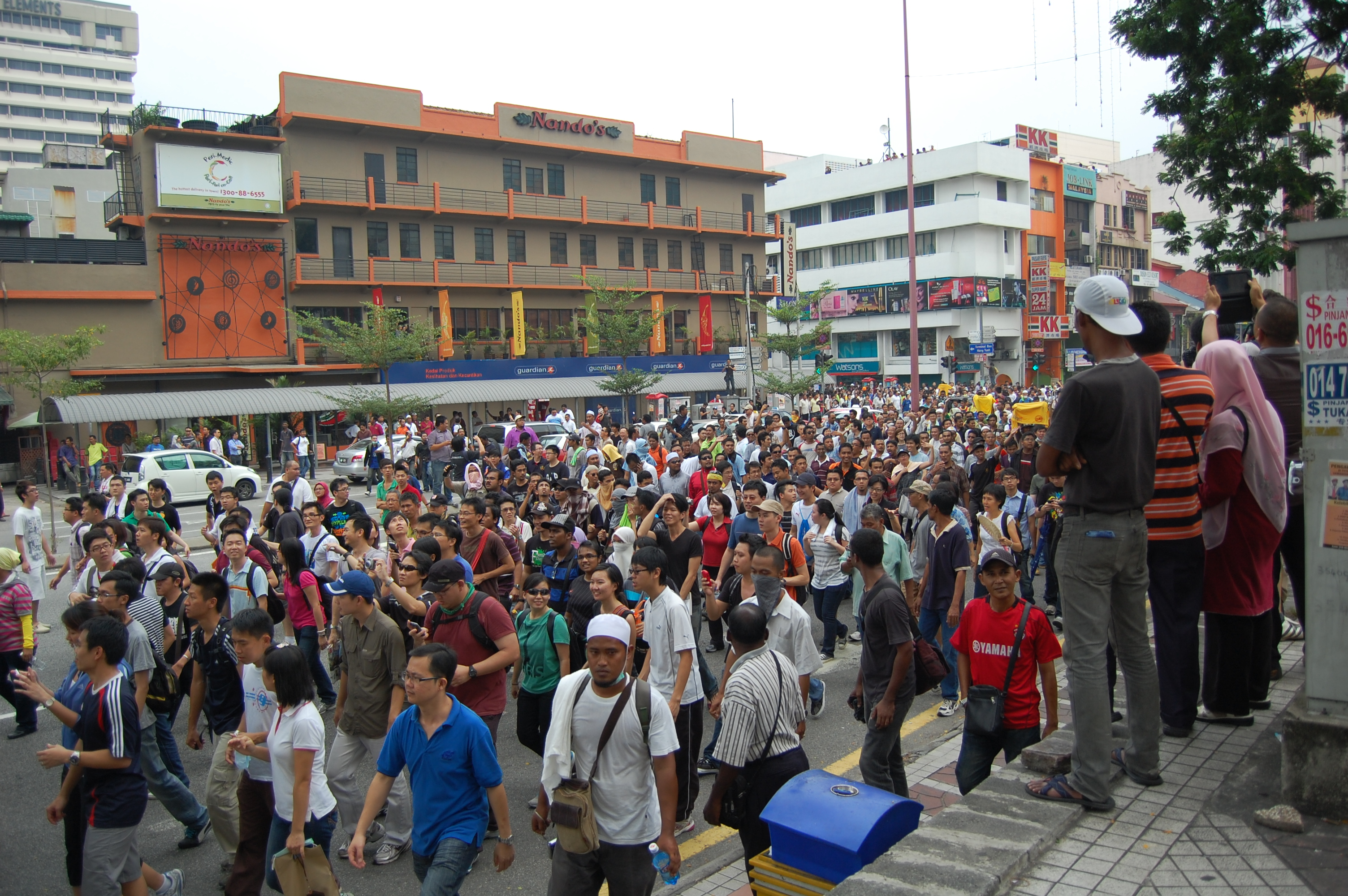
Protesters marching the streets of Kuala Lumpur during the illegal Bersih 2.0 rally on 9 July.

- 1 July – The Malaysia's Keretapi Tanah Melayu Berhad (KTMB) train service between Woodlands, Bukit Timah and the Tanjong Pagar railway station, Singapore ceased all operations. The KTMB's Tanjong Pagar railway station was relocated to the new terminus at the Woodlands Train Checkpoint (WTCP).
- 2 July – Home Minister, Dato' Seri Hishamuddin Hussein declares that the Coalition for Clean and Fair Elections (Bersih 2.0) is an unlawful organisation.
- 4 July
  - The 1Malaysia People Housing Scheme (PR1MA) is launched by the Prime Minister, Mohammad Najib Abdul Razak.
  - The Yang di-Pertuan Agong, Sultan Mizan Zainal Abidin of Terengganu issues a special statement on Bersih 2.0 rally saying that street demonstrations will bring more bad than good to the country.
- 5 July – The 9 July Bersih 2.0 street rally in Kuala Lumpur has been called off. The rally will be held in stadium.
- 7 July – The kindergarten hostage crisis took place in Sungai Abong, Muar, Johor. About 30 kindergarten children and four teachers of the Serikids Kindergarten were saved and the hammer-wielding man who held 30 children and four teachers hostage at a kindergarten was injured in his head and later he died at the Sultanah Fatimah Specialist Hospital.
- 8 July
  - About 91 individuals involved in planning the three separate Bersih 2.0 rallies on 9 July have been barred from the Kuala Lumpur business district on that day. Among those barred from entering the business district are Bersih 2.0 steering committee chairman Ambiga Sreenevasan, UMNO Youth chief Khairy Jamaluddin and Perkasa chief Datuk Ibrahim Ali. Others include DAP adviser Lim Kit Siang, PKR leader Dato' Seri Anwar Ibrahim, PKR vice-president and Batu MP Chua Tian Chang, UMNO Youth secretary Datuk Megat Firdouz Megat Junid and Putera 1Malaysia Club president Dato' Abdul Azeez Abdul Rahim.
  - Klang Valley's MY Rapid Transit (MRT) project is officially launched by the Prime Minister, Mohammad Najib Abdul Razak. Construction of the Sungai Buloh–Kajang line, part of the Klang Valley's MRT system has now begun.
- 9 July – The illegal Bersih 2.0 rally take place in Kuala Lumpur. Police fired teargas and water cannon to the protestors at all major hot spots in the city such as Central Market, Maybank Tower (Tun Perak Tower), Pudu Sentral and KLCC. Police arrest more than 1,600 people including committee chairman Ambiga Sreenevasan, UMNO Youth chief Khairy Jamaluddin and Perkasa chief Datuk Ibrahim Ali. Others include DAP adviser Lim Kit Siang, PKR leader Dato' Seri Anwar Ibrahim, PKR vice-president and Batu MP Chua Tian Chang, UMNO Youth secretary Datuk Megat Firdouz Megat Junid and Putera 1Malaysia Club president Dato' Abdul Azeez Abdul Rahim. Later that night, all 1,600 people were released.
- 11 July – Mohammad Najib Abdul Razak visits Turkmenistan for the first time and meets its president Gurbanguly Berdimuhamedov in the capital Ashgabat.
- 14 July – Mohammad Najib Abdul Razak meets British Prime Minister, David Cameron at No. 10 Downing Street, London, United Kingdom.
- 18 July – Mohammad Najib Abdul Razak meets Pope Benedict XVI in Vatican City for the first time. The diplomatic relations between Malaysia and Holy See were established.
- 26 July – The remains of 21 Iban people trackers and Sarawak Rangers who fell during Malayan Emergency were brought back from Kuala Lumpur to Sarawak and reburied in Heroes Cemetery in Kuching.
- 31 July – Sungai Siput Member of Parliament Dr. Michael Jeyakumar Devaraj and 5 others detained under the Emergency Ordinance just before the Bersih 2.0 rally on 9 July have been released.

=== August ===
- 6 August – Opening of the Bakun Hydroelectric Dam, the largest dam in Malaysia and Southeast Asia.
- 7 August – Seven people, including a family of three, died in a landslide in Kampung Sungai Ruil near Brinchang in Cameron Highlands, Pahang.
- 15 August – Perak Veterinary Services Department deputy director Dr. Rohani Kassim was found dead in Tambun near Ipoh, Perak.
- 18 August – Businessman and entrepreneur, Tony Fernandes completed his takeover of Premier League club Queens Park Rangers after buying out Formula One boss Bernie Ecclestone and former Renault F1 team principal Flavio Briatore. Tony Fernandes, who runs budget airline AirAsia and the Team Lotus Formula One team, bought a 66 percent stake in the London club through his company, the Tune Group.
- 21 August – PAS deputy president, Mohamad Sabu delivered a controversial statement by saying that it was Muhammad Indera or Mat Indera and the 200 Malayan Communist Party (PKM) terrorist soldiers during the 1950 Bukit Kepong Incident who deserved to be claimed as "national heroes" and not the police officers who fought to their deaths defending the Bukit Kepong police station, claiming that all police officers during the massacre as the "British officers" and the PKM soldiers are "true national heroes" as they "fought the British".
- 24 August – The 1 Malaysia People's Welfare Programme (KAR1SMA) is unveiled by the Prime Minister, Mohammad Najib Abdul Razak.
- 27 August – The Puduraya bus terminal was renamed as Pudu Sentral and it was officially opened by the Prime Minister, Mohammad Najib Abdul Razak.
- 31 August – Singapore government handed back its water treatment plants in Mount Pulai and Skudai and pump houses at Pontian and Tebrau to Johor state government ending the 1961 Water Agreement between Malaysia and Singapore.

=== September ===
- 2 September – Bernama TV cameraman Noramfaizul Mohd Nor 39, was killed, while a TV3 cameraman Aji Saregar Mazlan was injured after the Malaysian media team's four wheel drive vehicle was hit by stray bullet in an attack by rebel forces in Mogadishu, Somalia during the humanitarian mission in the country led by Putera 1Malaysia Club (KP1M). Noramfaizul was given as a true nation's hero by the government.
- 3 September – Google started to collaborate with Tourism Malaysia to record Malaysian locations to be featured on its Google Map Street View.
- 7–13 September — Malaysia at the 2011 Commonwealth Youth Games in Isle of Man.
- 8 September – Effective 15 September, prepaid mobile users need to pay a six per cent (6%) service tax on mobile prepaid services.
- 12 September – The six per cent (6%) service tax on mobile prepaid services is on hold.
- 13 September – Construction of the new Pandaruan Bridge of the Malaysia–Brunei border has now begun.
- 15 September – Mohammad Najib Abdul Razak announced the abolition of the Internal Security Act 1960 (ISA) and the three Emergency Declarations (Banishment Act (1959) and Emergency Ordinance) and their replacement by two new laws. The new laws will be enacted to protect the peace, harmony and security of the country.
- 17 September – Four Malaysians were killed in the bomb attacks in Su-ngai Kolok, Narathiwat, Thailand, a town near the border with Malaysia.
- 20 September — PAS deputy president, Mohamad Sabu was charged in court in relation to his speech about Muhammad Indera or Mat Indera during the 1950 Bukit Kepong Incident.
- 24 September – An Iban people hero during Insurgency, Kanang anak Langkau was conferred the Panglima Gemilang Bintang Kenyalang (P.G.B.K.) (English: Commander of the Order of the Hornbill Sarawak), with the title of 'Datuk' from the Governor of Sarawak, Tun Abang Muhammad Salahuddin.
- 28 September – Two security guards and a couple suffered minor injuries when a gas leak caused a massive explosion at the Empire Shopping Gallery in Subang Jaya, Selangor.

=== October ===
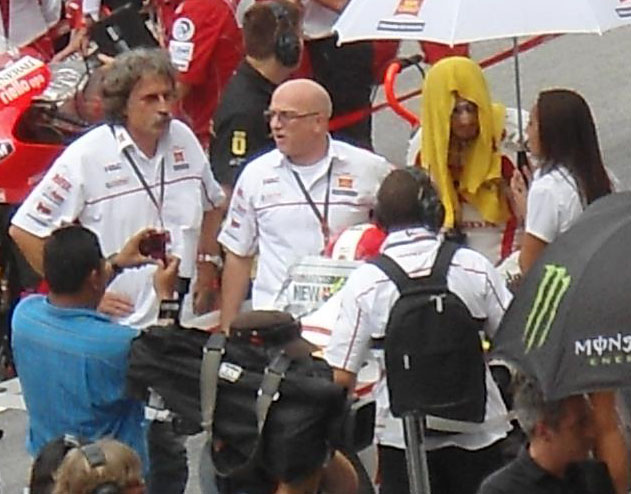
Final moments: Italian Motogp rider, Marco Simoncelli, with a towel on his head, on the grid at the 2011 Malaysian Grand Prix, his incomplete final race.

- 4 October
  - The Dewan Rakyat session move to the multipurpose hall near the Malaysian Houses of Parliament as a temporary assembly.
  - A tower crane fell onto three residential houses in Georgetown, Penang
- 5 October – All 125 people detained under the Restricted Residence Act has now freed as now part of move to repeal the act.
- 7 October – The Budget 2012 is held at the multipurpose hall near the Malaysian Houses of Parliament.
- 8 October – Bernama TV cameraman Noramfaizul Mohd Nor 39, who was killed in an attack in Mogadishu, Somalia received the posthumous award of Bintang Gagah Perkasa (B.G.P) from the Governor of Malacca, Tun Mohd Khalil Yaakob.
- 21 October – A man suffered light injuries when the front of his car was hit by a landslide at Km 13.9 of the Genting Sempah–Genting Highlands Highway near Genting Highlands, Pahang.
- 22 October – About 5,000 people gathered for the "Himpun Sejuta Umat" (Himpun) rally at the Shah Alam Stadium, Shah Alam, Selangor.
- 23 October – Italian MotoGP rider, Marco Simoncelli was killed in a horrific crash on the second lap during 2011 Malaysian Motorcycle Grand Prix at Sepang International Circuit, Selangor. His death is the first tragedy in the history of the Malaysian Motorcycle Grand Prix and the first to have happened in a race at this circuit.
- 29 October – A Malaysian tanker MV Nautica Johor Baru with 11 Malaysian and eight Indonesian crew members on board was rescued from hijackers on morning after they were attacked by a group of 10 foreign men armed with a pistol and parang.
- 31 October – Nine people, including a pregnant woman, were injured when a Sabah State Railway passenger train crashed into an oil tanker at a level crossing in Jalan Kota Kinabalu–Petagas near the Kota Kinabalu International Airport (KKIA), Kota Kinabalu, Sabah.

=== November ===
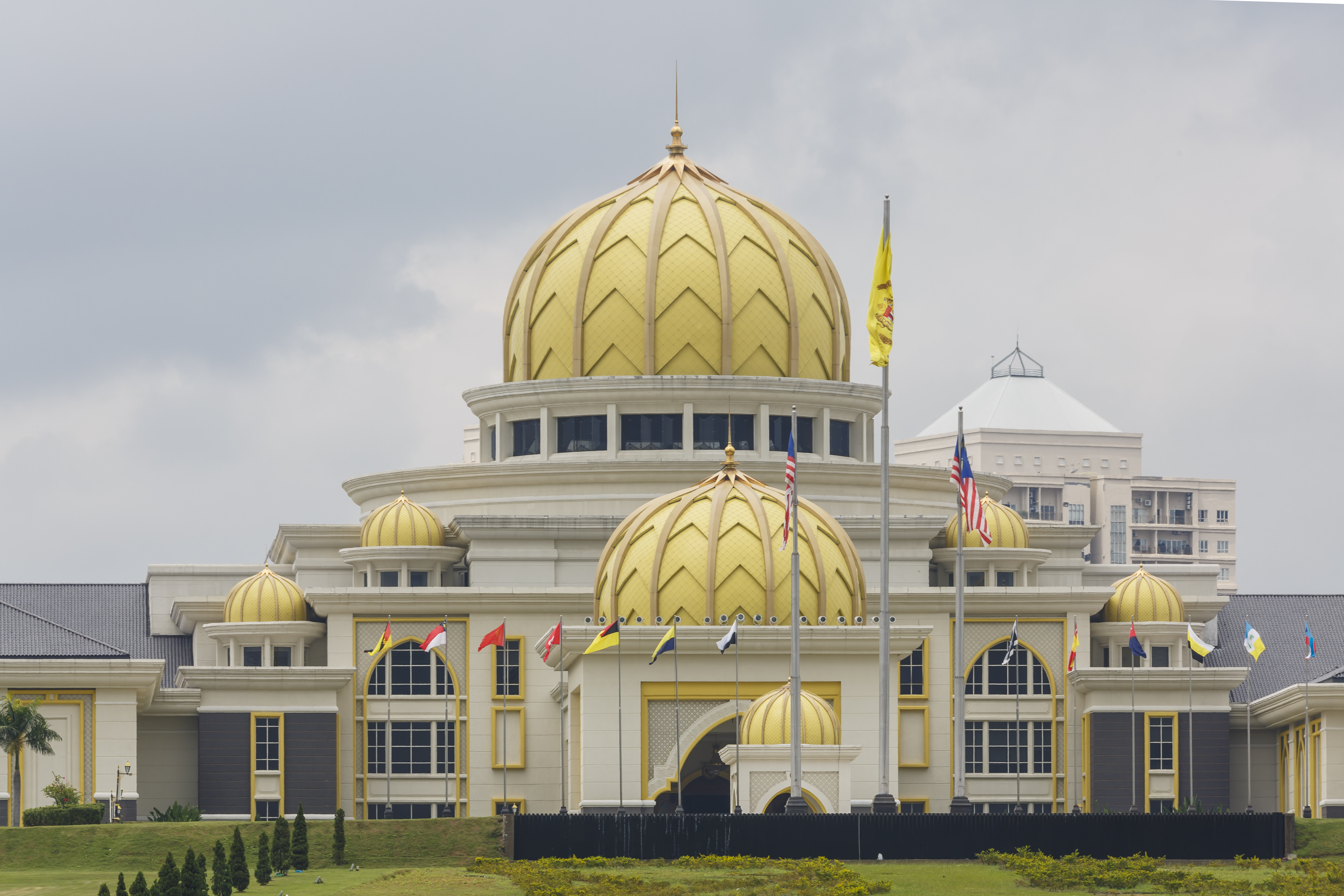
The new Istana Negara at Jalan Tuanku Abdul Halim, Kuala Lumpur, Malaysia.

- 1 November – The Klang Bus Station or Klang Bus Stand is closed to make way for the new Pasar Seni MRT station. The station is part of the construction of the new Sungai Buloh–Kajang MRT line.
- 3 November – The 2011 Seksualiti Merdeka event was banned by the federal government.
- 3 November – Malaysia has officially become a member of the Antarctic Treaty Pact. It is the first ASEAN country and the 49th nation to do so.
- 11 November – Four people were killed in the bus-trailer crash at North–South Expressway near Behrang, Perak.
- 11–22 November — Malaysia at the 2011 SEA Games in Jakarta and Palembang, Indonesia.
- 15 November – The Istana Negara at Jalan Istana is officially closed and moved to the new Istana Negara at Jalan Tuanku Abdul Halim, Kuala Lumpur, Malaysia.
- 20 November – Malaysian football team wins gold medal after beating Indonesia (2-2) 4–3 in the penalty shootout at the 2011 SEA Games football men's final in Indonesia.
- 29 November – The Peaceful Assembly Bill of 2011 is passed by the Malaysian Parliament.

=== December ===
- 11 December – The Johor Premium Outlets a main shopping centre in Iskandar Malaysia, Johor is opened.
- 12 December – The 13th Yang di-Pertuan Agong, Sultan Mizan Zainal Abidin of Terengganu, Sultan of Terengganu departed from Kuala Lumpur after the end of his term, and returned to his state as its ruler.
- 13 December – Sultan Abdul Halim Mu'adzam Shah of Kedah is elected as the country's 14th Yang di-Pertuan Agong for the second time and Sultan Muhammad V of Kelantan is elected as the Deputy Yang di-Pertuan Agong.
- 15–20 December — Malaysia at the 2011 ASEAN Para Games in Surakarta (Solo), Indonesia.
- 21 December – The new series of Malaysian ringgit banknotes and coins were introduced.

== National Day and Malaysia Day ==
=== Theme ===
1 Malaysia: Transformasi Berjaya, Rakyat Sejahtera (1 Malaysia: Transformation Successful, People Prosperous)

=== National Day parade ===
Independence Square, Kuala Lumpur

=== Malaysia Day celebrations ===
Independence Square, Kuala Lumpur

== Sports ==
- 22 January–1 February – 2011 Tour de Langkawi
- 8–13 March – 2011 Jelajah Malaysia
- 14–17 April – 2011 Maybank Malaysian Open
- 2–12 June — 2011 Sukma Games in Kuala Lumpur: The first elective Sukma Games in history organised by National Sports Council of Malaysia. It was planned to be held every alternate years with State Sukma Games.
- 13 July – Arsenal FC Asian Tour – Malaysia vs Arsenal (0–4).
- 16 July – Liverpool FC Asian Tour – Malaysia vs Liverpool (3–6).
- 21 July – Chelsea FC Asian Tour – Malaysia vs Chelsea (0–1).
- 26 September–2 October – 2011 Proton Malaysian Open.
- 20 November — 2011 Penang Bridge International Marathon.

== Deaths ==
- 1 January – Faizal Yusof – Malaysian actor.
- 6 February – Abdul Ajib Ahmad – 12th Menteri Besar of Johor (1982–1986).
- 20 March – Muhammad Naquiddin – An 11-year-old boy.
- 21 March – Tengku Ampuan Bariah of Terengganu – Mother of the Yang di-Pertuan Agong, Sultan Mizan Zainal Abidin of Terengganu (1979–1998).
- 30 March – Shan Ruhong – Politburo member of the Malayan Communist Party.
- 6 April – Ahmad Sarbani Mohamed – Malaysian Anti-Corruption Commission
- 17 July – Lo' Lo' Mohd Ghazali – Titiwangsa PAS Member of Parliament.
- 18 July – James Wong Kim Min – 1st Sarawak's Deputy Chief Minister.
- 2 September – Noramfaizul Mohd Nor – Bernama TV cameraman.
- 10 September – David Choong – Badminton legend.
- 23 October – Marco Simoncelli – Italian Motogp rider.
- 23 December – Abdul Hamid Othman – Former Minister in the Prime Minister's Department.

== See also ==
- 2011
- 2010 in Malaysia | 2012 in Malaysia
- History of Malaysia
- List of Malaysian films of 2011
