= Ppz =

ppz or variant, may refer to:

- Pride and Prejudice and Zombies (2009 novel), horror-comedy parody novel based on Jane Austen's Pride and Prejudice
- Pride and Prejudice and Zombies (film) (2016), horror-comedy parody film based on the novel
- Zastava PPZ, Czech CZ-99 series .45 ACP handgun by Zastava
- Perimeter Patrol Zone, an element of the TV show Robot Wars (TV series)
- Puerto Páez Airport (IATA airport code: PPZ), in Azure, Venezuela; see List of airports in Venezuela
- Pusat Pungutan Zakat (Kuala Lumpur, Malaysia), see Urban Transformation Centre
