= Amru Al-As Mosque =

Mosque in Kuala Lumpur, Malaysia

Religion
- Affiliation: Islam

Location
- Location: Bandar Baru Sentul, Kuala Lumpur, Malaysia
- Interactive map of Amru Al-As Mosque
- Coordinates: 3°10′48″N 101°41′55″E

The Amru Al-As Mosque (Malay: Masjid Amru Al-As) is a prominent mosque in Bandar Baru Sentul, Kuala Lumpur, Malaysia.

== History ==
The mosque was constructed since 3 May 1995 until 18 August 1997. It was then opened in 1998.

== See also ==
- Islam in Malaysia
