= Urban Transformation Centre =

Public amenities centres in Malaysia

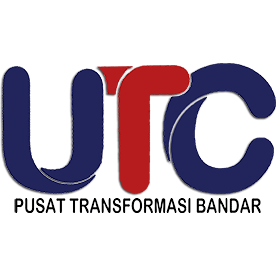
Logo from 2012-present

UTC Pasir Gudang

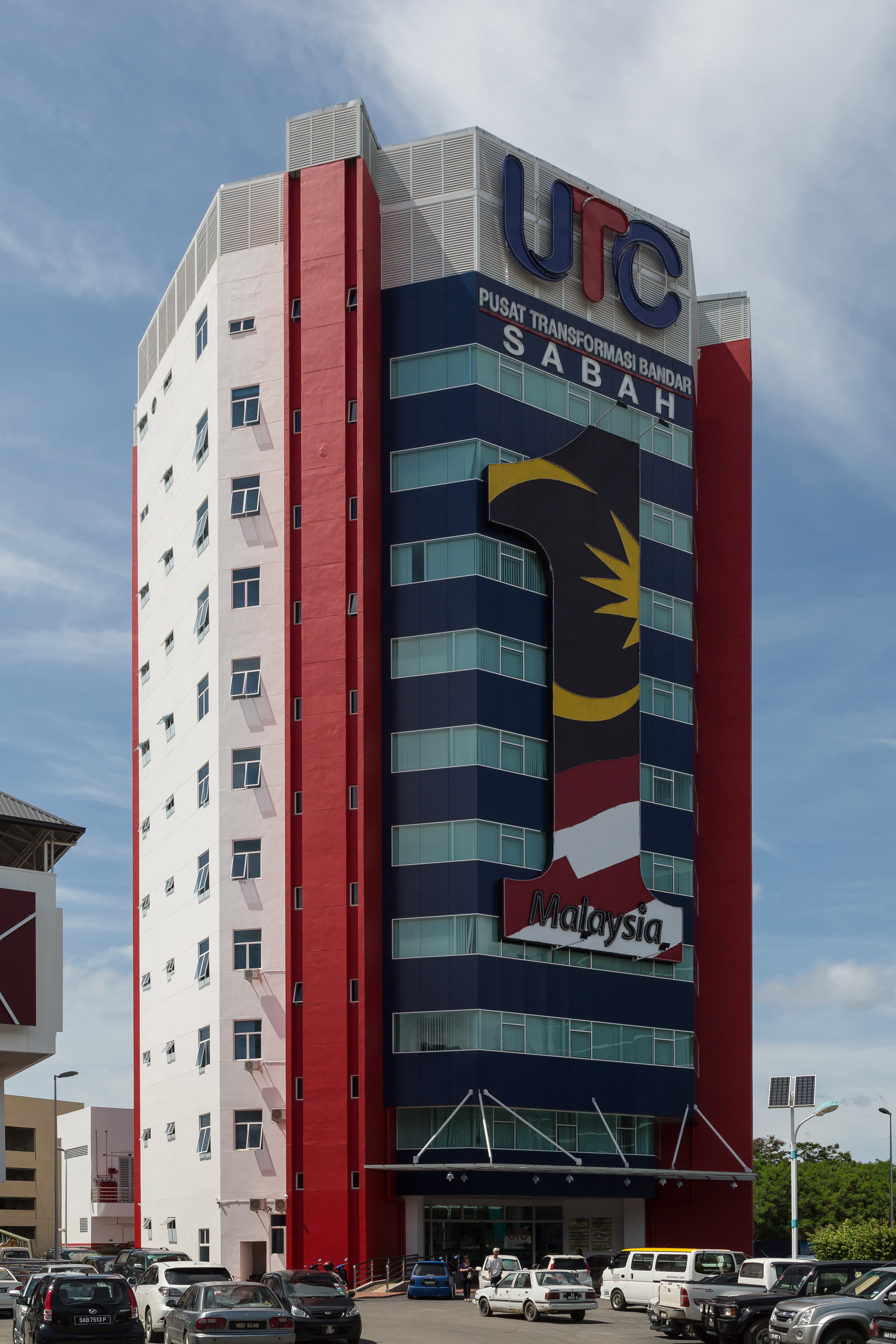
UTC Sabah

The Urban Transformation Centre (UTC) (Malay: Pusat Transformasi Bandar) is a public amenities centre located at some state capitals and urban areas in Malaysia. The rural counterpart of UTC is Rural Transformation Center (RTC). UTC can be found in the tallest building by state in Malaysia, such as City Plaza Tower in Kedah, KOMTAR Tower in Penang.

== Overview ==
UTC is one of the efforts and initiatives of the Malaysian government to provide urban communities a centralised location for core government agencies, public amenities and services of private sectors. It is part of the National Blue Ocean Strategy (NBOS) which was introduced to improve the quality of services through strategic partnerships between government agencies and the private sector.

National Strategy Unit (NSU) under Ministry of Finance Malaysia (MOF) is tasked to establish and monitor all the UTCs in Malaysia.

UTC comprises ten clusters of facilities and services, namely: common governmental services; health services; security services; education, training and employment services; financial services; business and entrepreneurial development services; utility services; youth development services; welfare and community development services; and non-governmental organization (NGO) services.

=== Government Agencies ===
Core government agencies mostly available in all UTCs:

- Royal Malaysian Police
- Klinik 1Malaysia
- Kedai Rakyat 1Malaysia
- Kedai Kain 1Malaysia
- Companies Commission of Malaysia (CCM)
- Ministry of Human Resources
  - Jobs Malaysia
- Suruhanjaya Pengangkutan Awam Darat (SPAD)
- Malaysian Road Transport Department (JPJ)
- Jabatan Imigresen Malaysia
- Lembaga Hasil Dalam Negeri (LHDN)
- ePerolehan
- Kumpulan Wang Simpanan Pekerja (KWSP)
- Pos Malaysia
- Bank Simpanan Nasional
- Tabung Ekonomi Kumpulan Usaha Niaga (TEKUN)
- Federal Agricultural Marketing Authority (FAMA)
- Amanah Ikhtiar Malaysia (AIM)
- SME Bank
- Perbadanan Tabung Pendidikan Tinggi Nasional (PTPTN)
- Indah Water Konsortium (IWK)
- Agrobank
- Tenaga Nasional
- Perbadanan Usahawan Nasional Berhad (PUNB)
- Majlis Amanah Rakyat (MARA)
- Telekom Malaysia (TM)
- Ministry of Woman, Family and Community
- Ministry of Youth and Sports
- 1M4U
- Tabung Haji
- Biro Pengaduan Awam (BPA)
- Ministry of International Trade and Industry (MITI)

=== Public Amenities ===
Public amenities may vary from one UTC to the other depending on the location and size of the centre:-

- Futsal court
- Cybercafe
- Gymnasium
- Medical centre
- Rock climbing
- ATM machines
- Information kiosk
- Cafeteria

== List of Existing UTCs ==
There are 12 UTCs in Malaysia in Alor Setar, Ipoh, Johor Bahru, Kota Kinabalu, Kuala Lumpur, Kuantan, Kuching, Melaka, Bandar Baru Sentul, Keramat, Miri and Sibu. In 2015, the UTCs collectively served 11.5 million people. The government aims to set up a UTC in each state.

=== UTC Johor ===
The UTC Johor is located at Galleria@Kotaraya, Jalan Trus, Johor Bahru, Johor. It opened to public on 3 July 2014.

==== Government Agencies ====
Specific federal and state government agencies that are available at UTC Johor:-

Jabatan Pengangkutan Jalan (JPJ) = renew road tax / license.

- Johor Bahru City Council (MBJB)
- Iskandar Puteri City Council (MBIP)
- Tabung Haji
- Johor Education Foundation (YPJ)
- Johor Religious Council (MAIJ)
- Johor Religious Department (JAIJ)
- Land and Mineral Office
- State Government Secretary's Office
- Syarikat Air Johor (SAJ)

=== UTC Kedah ===
UTC Kedah Building.

The UTC Kedah is located at Kompleks UTC Kedah, Alor Star, Kedah. It was officiated by the Prime Minister, Datuk Seri Najib Tun Razak on 16 August 2013.

The building, formerly known as Kompleks Majlis Bandaraya Alor Setar (MBAS). The centre covers the area of 23,226 sq metres, making it the biggest UTC in the country.

=== UTC Kuala Lumpur ===
The UTC Kuala Lumpur is located at Pudu Sentral, Jalan Tun Tan Cheng Lock, 50550 Kuala Lumpur. It is the second UTC after Melaka, and was officiated by the former Prime Minister, Datuk Seri Najib Tun Razak on 22 September 2012.

==== Government Agencies ====
Specific federal and state government agencies that are available at UTC Kuala Lumpur:-

- Dewan Bandaraya Kuala Lumpur (DBKL)
- Majlis Agama Islam Wilayah Persekutuan (MAIWP)
- Pusat Pungutan Zakat MAIWP (PPZ)
- Indah Water Konsortium (IWK)

=== UTC Melaka ===
The UTC Melaka is located at Jalan Hang Tuah, 75300 Melaka. It is the first UTC in Malaysia, and was officiated by the Prime Minister, Datuk Seri Najib Tun Razak on 23 June 2012.

==== Government Agencies ====
Specific federal and state government agencies that are available at UTC Melaka:-

- Syarikat Air Melaka Berhad (SAMB)
- Perbadanan Pengurusan Sisa Pepejal dan Pembersihan Awam Negeri Melaka (PPSPPA)
- Majlis Bandaraya Melaka Bersejarah (MBMB)
- Majlis Agama Islam Melaka (MAIM)
- Pusat Zakat Melaka (PZM)
- Amanah Ikhtiar Malaysia (AIM)

=== UTC Perak ===
The UTC Perak is located at Pasar Besar Ipoh, Ipoh, Perak. It is the third UTC after Melaka and Kuala Lumpur, and was officiated by the Prime Minister, Datuk Seri Najib Tun Razak on 15 February 2013.

=== UTC Pahang ===
The UTC Pahang is located at Bangunan UTC Pahang, Jalan Stadium, 25200 Kuantan, Pahang. It was officiated by the Prime Minister, Datuk Seri Najib Tun Razak on 11 April 2013.

The building was formerly a bus and taxi terminal known as Terminal Makmur. The bus and taxi terminal was moved to Terminal Kuantan Sentral.

==== Government Agencies ====
Specific federal and state government agencies that are available at UTC Pahang:-

- Bahagian Perumahan Pejabat SUK Pahang
- Jabatan Agama Islam Pahang (JAIP)
- Jabatan Kehakiman Syariah Pahang
- Kolej Islam Sultan Haji Ahmad Shah (KIPSAS)
- Majlis Perbandaran Kuantan (MPK)
- Majlis Ugama Islam dan Adat Resam Melayu Pahang (MUIP)
- Pahang Skill Development Centre (PSDC)
- Pengurusan Air Pahang Berhad (PAIP)
- Perbadanan Kemajuan Bukit Fraser (PKBF)
- Perbadanan Kemajuan Negeri Pahang (PKNP)
- Perbadanan Perpustakaan Awam Pahang
- Pusat Kutipan Zakat Pahang
- Yayasan Pahang

==== Non-Governmental Organisations ====
Specific NGOs that are available at UTC Pahang:-

- All Bikers Club
- Bulan Sabit Merah Malaysia (PBSM)
- Majlis Belia Negeri Pahang
- Majlis Pendekar Negeri Pahang
- Persatuan Radio Amatur Negeri Pahang (PERAMAH)

=== UTC Sabah ===
==== Kota Kinabalu ====
UTC Sabah is located at UTC Kota Kinabalu, Lorong Belia, 88000 Kota Kinabalu, Sabah. The sixth UTC was soft launched by the Second Finance Minister, Dato' Seri Ahmad Husni Hanadzlah on 23 January 2014, and was officially launched by the Prime Minister, Datuk Seri Najib Tun Razak on 15 November 2014.

==== Tawau ====
Tawau UTC was opened on 15 August 2016 at the Tanjong Market. The UTC operates at levels 2 and 6 of the market.

==== Keningau ====
The third UTC in Sabah and 17th in Malaysia was opened in Keningau on 17 November 2016. The UTC was built at a cost of RM 29 million. The UTC will serve the districts of Keningau and neighbouring districts like Tambunan, Nabawan, Tenom and Sipitang.

=== UTC Sarawak ===
==== Kuching ====
UTC Sarawak is located at Aras 2, UTC Sarawak, Jalan Bukit Mata, 93100 Kuching, Sarawak. It was opened to public on 1 October 2014 and was officiated by the Prime Minister, Datuk Seri Najib Tun Razak on 26 February 2015.

The establishment of UTC Sarawak was announced by the Secretary-General of the Ministry of Finance, Tan Sri Dr Mohd Irwan Serigar Abdullah on 18 July 2013.

==== Miri ====
UTC Miri is the second UTC in Sarawak, and is located at Miri City Council multi-storey carpark. The UTC was opened to public on 16 March 2016. Agencies operating at the UTC are Miri City Council, Sarawak Energy Bhd, Laku Management, Police, Inland Revenue Board, Treasury Department, Sports and Youth Department, National Registration Department, Welfare Department, Miri Resident office, Miri District Office and Immigration Department.

==== Sibu ====
In October 2015, it is announced that Level 8-10 of Sibu Central Market will be converted into a one-stop UTC that serves Sibu and the surrounding areas. The UTC started its operation on 14 March 2016 and houses the offices of Immigration Department, National Registration Department, Sibu Water Board, Sarawak Energy Corporation (Sesco), State Treasury Department, Resident's Office, District Office, Road Transport Department, 1Malaysia Clinic, Police Department and several other Federal offices. The MYR 32.3 million UTC was officially opened by the Deputy Prime Minister Datuk Seri Ahmad Zahid Hamidi on 22 April 2016.

== Mini UTC ==
Although the Government's initial objective was to establish a UTC in all state capital and also Mini-UTC in densely populated areas like Sentul and Keramat in Kuala Lumpur, the exploding demand for UTC including that of Mini-UTCs made the Government to upgrade Mini-UTCs to be named as a UTC by itself. All the UTCs established in state capital will be known by the state's name, e.g.: UTC Kedah in Alor Setar, while UTC established in city's will be known by the city/town name, e.g.: UTC Sungai Petani.

This is inline with Government's aspiration to bring the services closer to people. By having UTC it is a recognition for the city/town as an urban area.

=== UTC Sentul (Formerly known as Mini UTC Sentul) ===
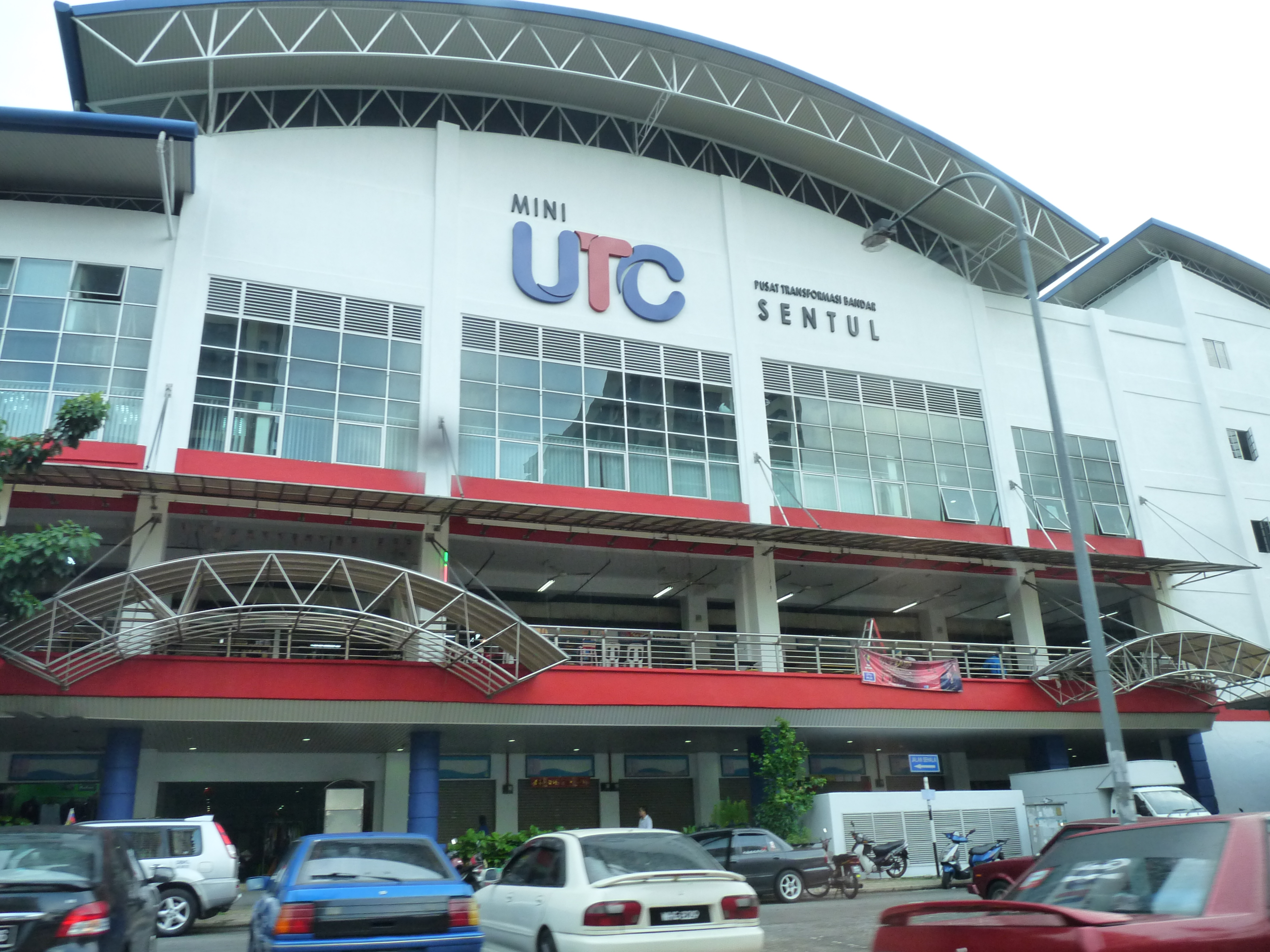
Mini UTC Sentul in February 2013

The Mini UTC Sentul is located at Kompleks Perniagaan dan Komuniti, Bandar Baru Sentul, Kuala Lumpur. It is the first mini UTC built in the country, with the cost of RM 7.7 million. The centre was officiated by Federal Territories Minister Datuk Seri Tengku Adnan Tengku Mansor on 16 March 2013.

=== UTC Keramat (Formerly known as Mini UTC Keramat) ===
The establishment of Mini UTC Keramat at the Keramat Mall was announced by Federal Territories Minister Datuk Seri Tengku Adnan Tengku Mansor on 8 June 2013, in order to generate more traffic to the mall. It was further confirmed by Titiwangsa Member of Parliament Datuk Johari Abdul Ghani on 1 June 2014 that the centre is expected to be operational by the end of 2014.

== List of Proposed / In Progress UTCs ==
Seven UTCs are to be developed in 2015 in Negeri Sembilan, Perlis, Kelantan and Terengganu; three of these centres are mini UTC in Kedah, Sabah and Sarawak costing approximately RM 200 million.
