= Death of Ahmad Sarbani Mohamed =

2011 death of a Malaysian customs official during a corruption investigation

Ahmad Sarbani Mohamed was a Malaysian customs officer from Port Klang. On 6 April 2011, he was found dead in an open air badminton court on the first floor of the Malaysian Anti-Corruption Commission (MACC) building in Kuala Lumpur. His death coincided with the MACC's investigation into allegations of corruption in the Royal Malaysian Customs. The MACC insists that Ahmad Sarbani was not murdered, nor did he commit suicide, but rather fell to his death trying to escape from the building. In September 2011, the coroner's court ruled the death an accident.

Ahmad Sarbani's death came nearly two years after the death of Teoh Beng Hock in the custody of the MACC. A royal commission of inquiry ruled Teoh's death as suicide resulting from abusive behaviour by MACC officers, a verdict which was rejected by the victim's family.

== Biography ==
Ahmad Sarbani bin Mohamed was the Selangor Customs assistant director. He was attached to the Port Klang Customs office. At the time of his death, Ahmad Sarbani was 56 years old. He is survived by his parents, his wife, and five children.

== Events leading to death ==
On 29 March 2011, the MACC announced that it had uncovered a syndicate involved in tax evasion, money laundering and illegal money outflows worth RM108 billion. That figure was later revised to RM2.2 billion. A special task force comprising the MACC, the Inland Revenue Board, the Customs Department and Bank Negara Malaysia raided over 100 premises, including 25 Royal Malaysian Customs offices, in what was known as "Operation 3B."

Ahmad Sarbani was among 62 customs officers who were detained relation to the investigation. He was first detained on 1 April 2011. He was then picked up again by the MACC for questioning on 4 April. During this round of questioning, he confessed to accepting between RM50 and RM100 a month from Schenker Logistics officer Wan Zainal Abidin Wan Zaki and between RM30 and RM200 a month from a Top Mark Freight & Shipping officer called Ah Seng. After giving his statement, Sarbani was released on bail.

He returned to the MACC building on Jalan Cochrane, Kuala Lumpur at 8:26 am on 6 April, apparently to change a statement he had previously given. The MACC maintains he had gone on his own accord without prior appointment. According to MACC accounts, Ahmad Sarbani was brought into a room on the third floor by an officer and disappeared a few minutes after 10:15 am. He was then found dead in the open air badminton court on the first floor at 10:20 am.

Police classified the case as sudden death.

== Aftermath ==
In a press conference after the news emerged, MACC director of investigations Mustafar Ali said Ahmad Sarbani went to the MACC building without prior appointment. Two MACC investigating officers who met Ahmad Sarbani were suspended on 8 April. The MACC also announced that all business with accused persons, suspects, witnesses and complainants would be conducted only on the ground floor with heightened supervision.

None of the Customs officers initially held under the tax evasion and money laundering allegations has been charged.

Ahmad Sarbani's family lawyers denied allegations that he was involved in money laundering and rejected suggestions that he committed suicide.

=== Inquest ===
On 2 June 2011, Attorney-General Abdul Gani Patail agreed to hold an inquest into Ahmad Sarbani's death. The inquest was held from 4 to 15 July 2011 at the magistrate's court in Kuala Lumpur and continued on 2 August.

Family

Sarbani's wife, Maziah, told the court that her husband was "very calm, patient and rational" and would "never" have committed suicide.

Schenker Logistics

Schenker Logistics senior executive Wan Zainal Abidin Wan Zaki denied that Sarbani ever took bribes from his company. Zainal Abidin said Sarbani called him at 8:55 pm on 4 April to tell him that his name was mentioned by Sarbani when questioned by the MACC. He also told the court he felt Sarbani was being pressured. Zainal Abidin last spoke to Sarbani at 9:55 pm on 5 April to ask how he was.

Customs officers

Customs officer Abdul Rahim Abdul Kadir, who among those arrested in the MACC crackdown on tax evasion and money laundering, told the court that he was beaten and forced to confess to accepting bribes by the MACC. He said he lodged a police report on the incident then retracted it out of fear. Another Customs officer, Mohd Khairul Hisyam Mohd Gazali, said Sarbani told him on 2 April that he was pressured by the MACC to confess that he had accepted bribes but refused to give in.

Three of Sarbani's colleagues testified that Sarbani was calm and patient man with "high integrity."

MACC

Investigating officer Abdul Ghani Ali testified that he was under orders from KL MACC investigation unit head Mohd Fauzi Husin not to allow Sarbani to change his statement on 6 April. He said he ordered Sarbani to wait in the MACC office before Sarbani was found dead. Ghani also said: "Throughout my career, I think no one has confessed like this before. I’ve never met a suspect who confessed."

Assistant superintendent Mohd Rosly Mohd Saup testified that Sarbani denied accepting bribes from a Top Mark officer on 2 April.

Assistant superintendent Sheikh Niza Khairy Sheikh Mohamad said Sarbani confessed to him on 4 April to receiving "goodwill payments" and that Sarbani went to the MACC office two days later to change his statement.

Forensics

DSP Sharul Othman Mansor from the Bukit Aman Forensic Division said Sarbani fell 10 m to his death.

Forensic investigator DSP Sharul Othman Mansor told the court that Sarbani's death was neither suicide nor murder. He instead claimed that Sarbani tried to jump over the roof of the badminton court, but missed and fell to his death. Sharul added that there were no signs of a struggle and that an optical illusion made the roof appear near to the corner of the window.

Forensic pathologist Faridah Mohd Noor, who performed the autopsy, said the death was "accidental" based on "the injuries and circumstantial evidence."

==== Verdict ====
On 26 September 2011, the coroner's court ruled Sarbani's death an accident. Coroner Aizatul Akmal Maharani said the fear of being arrested must have preyed heavily on Ahmad Sarbani's mind so as to make him consider the window exit. Aizatul also remarked that the MACC officer tasked to look after Sarbani on 6 April had been "negligent."

=== Malaysia Today allegations ===
Prominent blogger Raja Petra Kamaruddin alleged on his Malaysia Today blog that Sarbani fell accidentally from the third-floor pantry window of the MACC building after being forced onto the ledge by a senior MACC officer. He claimed the MACC then went through great lengths, including "concoct[ing] the most plausible story" and wiping CCTV footage, to cover up the incident. Raja Petra also posted what appeared to be Sarbani's cautioned statement denying that he had ever received "additional profit" as a Customs officer.

Sarbani's family lawyer Awtar Singh said Raja Petra's allegations were "plausible [ada asasnya]."

The MACC's lawyer called the allegations "nonsense."
