= Emergency Ordinance (Malaysia) =

Malaysia emergency ordinance

In Malaysia, the Emergency Ordinance (Malay: Ordinan Darurat, abbreviated EO) is used and enacted following a Proclamation of Emergency that has been issued by the Yang di-Pertuan Agong (as the Malaysian head of state) under Articles 150 of the Constitution.

== List of Emergency Ordinance ==
Emergency ordinance	Promulgated / Issued by	Date of issue	Date of coming into force	Explanation	Status
Emergency Ordinance 1966 [P.U.(A)339A/1966] Emergency (Federal Constitution and Constitution of Sarawak) Act, 1966 (Act No. 68 of 1966)	Ismail Nasiruddin of Terengganu, 4th Yang di-Pertuan Agong	14 September 1966	20 September 1966	Expands powers of the Governor.	Repealed
Emergency Ordinance 1969 [P.U.(A)145/1969] Emergency (Essential Powers) Ordinance, 1969 (No. 1)	Ismail Nasiruddin of Terengganu, 4th Yang di-Pertuan Agong	12 June 1969	16 May 1969	Allows the supreme head (Yang di-Pertuan Agong) to make any regulation for the maintenance of public order and security, including regulations providing for the punishment of persons, the creation of offences and penalties (including death penalty), control of aliens, and the deprivation of citizenship.	Repealed
Emergency (Essential Powers) Ordinance 1969 (No. 2)	Ismail Nasiruddin of Terengganu, 4th Yang di-Pertuan Agong		17 May 1969	Transfers executive authority in relation to emergency powers to a Director of Operations, who shall be designated by the Supreme Head. Also provides for a National Operations Council to assist the Director, and State Operations Committees to perform similar functions at the state level.	
Emergency (Public Order and Prevention of Crime) Ordinance, 1969 (No. 5)	Ismail Nasiruddin of Terengganu, 4th Yang di-Pertuan Agong		12 June 1969	Allows persons to be detained for up to 60 days without an order of detention, and to be held up to 2 years upon the order of the competent Minister. Sets forth procedures for representations in relation with this Ordinance.	
Emergency (Essential Powers) Ordinance of 1969 (No. 6)	Ismail Nasiruddin of Terengganu, 4th Yang di-Pertuan Agong		27 June 1969	Allows the Director of Operations to extend any law or subsidiary legislation without approval of Parliament.	
Emergency Ordinance 1977 [P.U.(A)358/1977] Emergency Powers (Kelantan) Act 1977	Yahya Petra of Kelantan, 6th Yang di-Pertuan Agong	8 November 1977			Repealed
Emergency (Essential Powers) Ordinance 2021 [P.U.(A) 12/2021]	Abdullah of Pahang, 16th Yang di-Pertuan Agong	14 January 2021	11 January 2021		
