= Kedai Rakyat 1Malaysia =

Chain of convenience stores in Malaysia

MRT Retail Sdn. Bhd.
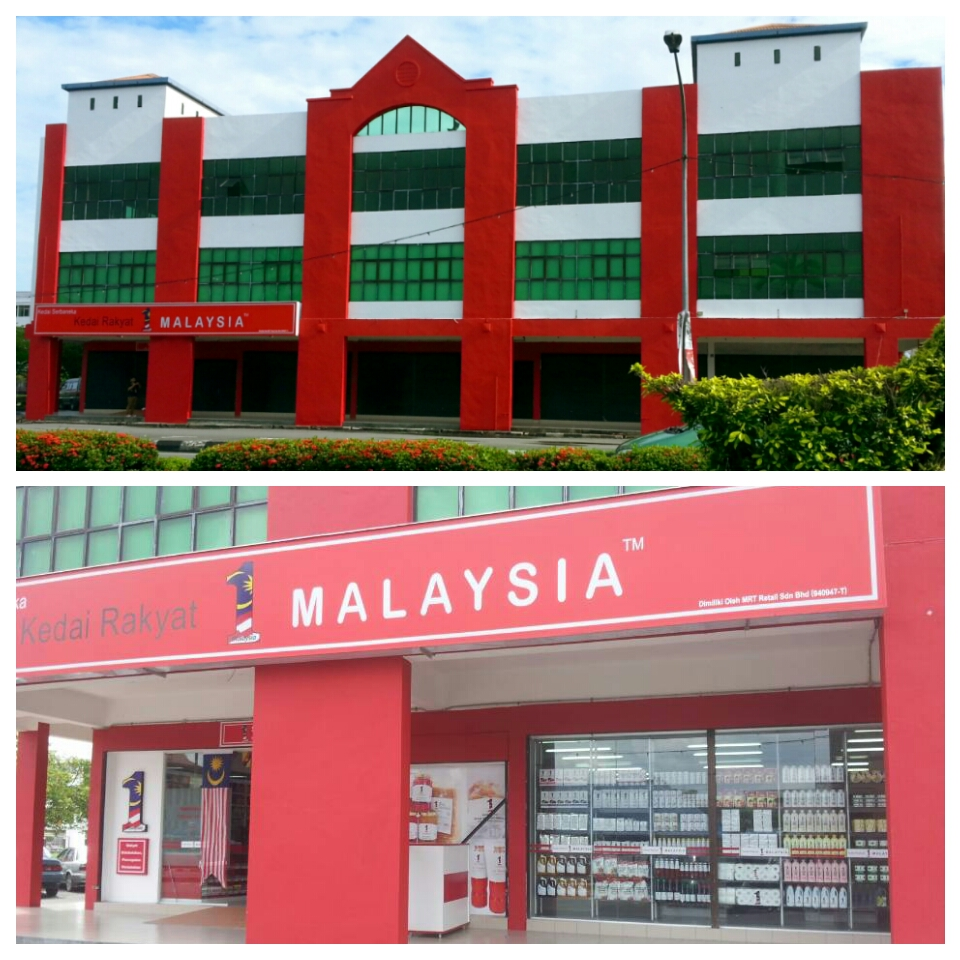
- Type: Public
- Industry: Convenience stores
- Founded: 2011; 15 years ago
- Defunct: July 2017
- Fate: Dissolved
- Products: Grocery stores
- Owner: Government of Malaysia
- Website: www.kedairakyat1malaysia.com.my

MRT Retail Sdn. Bhd., doing business as Kedai Rakyat 1Malaysia (KR1M) (unofficial English title: 1Malaysia Grocery Stores) was a government-owned chain of convenience stores in Malaysia. It was established as part of the national campaign of 1Malaysia. Due to declining turnout rates and support from the public, it has closed all locations in 2017.

== History ==
In 2011, the 1Malaysia franchise branched off into a grocery store franchise going by the name Kedai Rakyat 1Malaysia (KR1M), with the first store being located at the Kelana Jaya Line Light Rail Transit (LRT) station in Kelana Jaya. The franchise was aimed at allowing the low income group to obtain cheaper groceries, potentially bringing support to 1Malaysia.

In July 2017, the chain began closing down its stores as the government had terminated the contract with MYDIN, the operator of the 1Malaysia stores, due to alleged goods within the stores were priced higher than the market value.

== Public responses to KR1M ==
There were claims that the groceries sold within the stores were more expensive compared to those sold in other stores like it around Malaysia. This was denied by the former Ministry of Domestic Trade, Co-operatives and Consumerism Ismail Sabri. There have been also allegations of poor product quality in its products, namely children's milk powder, fresh milk, condensed milk, sweetened condensed creamer, oyster sauce, fruit jam, canned chicken curry, mango cordial, ghee compounds, peanuts, peanut butter, crispy peanut butter and fish tinned sardines in tomato sauce. In response, the franchise had its products sent out for a periodical laboratory testing.
