= Royal Malaysian Customs Department =

Malaysian Government department

Royal Malaysian Customs Department Jabatan Kastam Diraja Malaysia جابتن كستم دراج مليسيا
- Crest of the Royal Malaysian Customs
- Abbreviation: RMC / JKDM

Agency overview
- Formed: 1931
- Preceding agencies: Customs Union; Straits Settlement Customs and Excise Department; Federated Malay States Customs and Excise Department; Royal Malaysian Customs and Excise; Royal Malaysian Customs and Excise Department

Jurisdictional structure
- National agency (Operations jurisdiction): Malaysia
- Operations jurisdiction: Malaysia
- Legal jurisdiction: National
- Governing body: Government of Malaysia
- Specialist jurisdiction: Customs, excise, gambling

Operational structure
- Headquarters: Putrajaya, Malaysia
- Elected officers responsible: Anwar Ibrahim, Minister of Finance; Ahmad Maslan, Deputy Minister of Finance I; Steven Sim, Deputy Minister of Finance II
- Agency executive: Dato' Haji Amran bin Haji Ahmad
- Parent agency: Ministry of Finance

Website
- www.customs.gov.my

The Royal Malaysian Customs Department (Abbr.; RMCD; Malay: Jabatan Kastam Diraja Malaysia – JKDM; Jawi: جابتن كستم دراج مليسيا); is a government department body under the Ministry of Finance. RMCD functions as the country's main indirect tax collector, facilitating trade and enforcing laws.

RMCD facilitates trade by making sure that all imported and exported goods follow national and international rules. This involves inspecting and clearing goods at various entry and exit points, such as ports and airports. The department also works to prevent smuggling and other illegal activities through strict enforcement measures.

== Structure ==
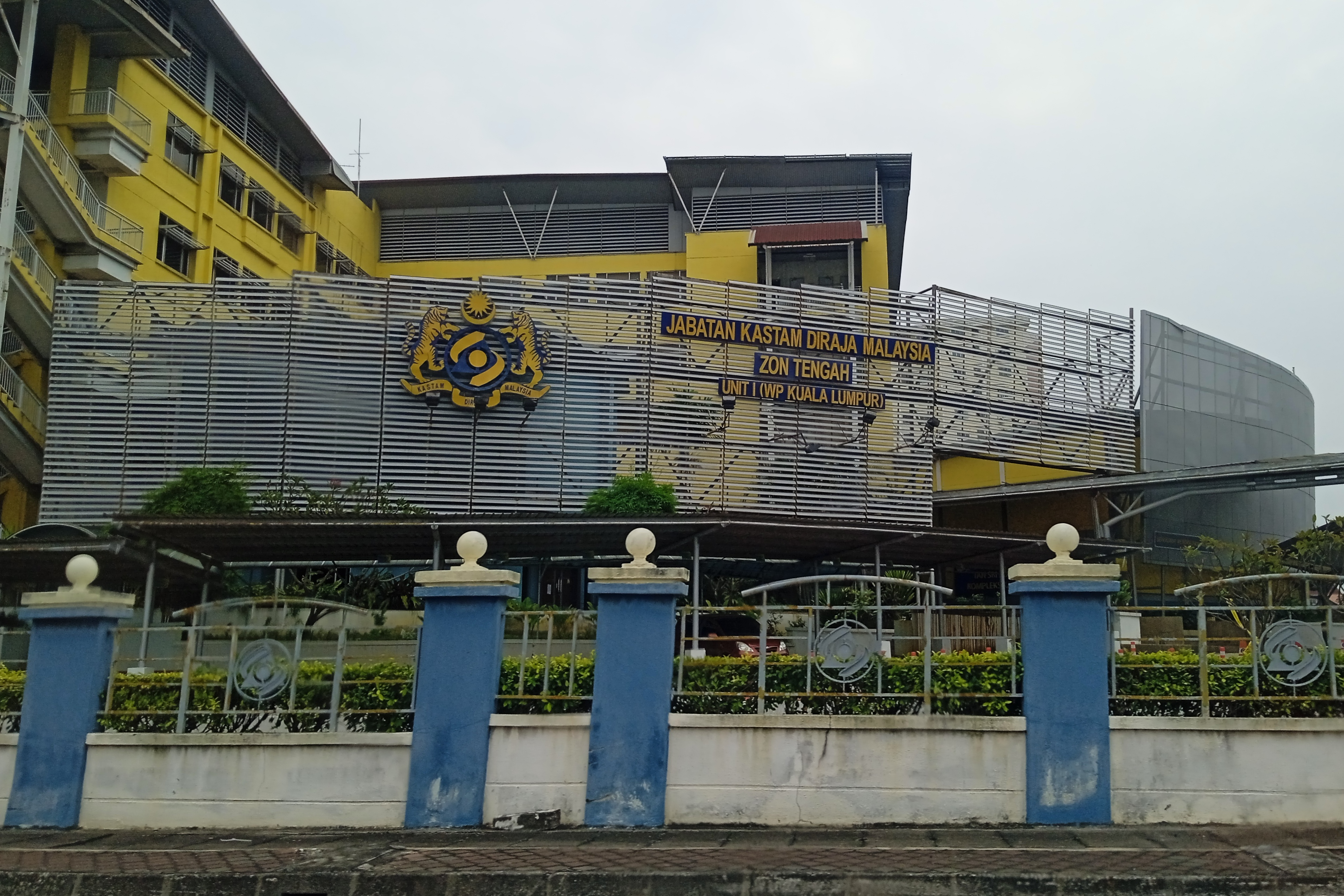
RMCD Kelana Jaya

The top management of the Royal Malaysian Customs Department is led by the Director General of Customs (Turus III) and assisted by 3 deputies, namely, the Deputy Director General of Customs Enforcement/Compliance Division (Jusa A), the Deputy Director General of Customs Customs/Inland Tax Division (Jusa A) and the Deputy Director General of Customs Management Division (Jusa B). In addition to that, there are also two Assistants of Director General for Enforcement (Jusa B) and Inland Tax (Jusa B). The RMCD consists of several divisions, namely the Enforcement Division, the Inland Tax Division, the Compliance Division, the Customs Division, and the Technical Services Division.

== Function and responsibility ==
Royal Malaysian Customs Department (RMCD) role is to:

- Collect national revenue in the form of taxes and customs duties consisting of import duty, export duty, excise duty, sales tax, service tax, extraordinary profit levy, vehicle levy, departure levy, non-tax revenue, state revenue/trust money and tourism tax.
- Providing trade facilitation in the form of incentives and facilitation to the industrial and commercial sectors that aim to generate the national economy in line with the change in government policy that prioritizes the industrial sector has been prepared by RMCD.
- Enforce laws and regulations administered by RMCD.

== Legislation ==
JKDM has been allocated the authority to enforce the Acts/Regulations as below. The list of legal references is as follows:

- Customs Act 1967 & Regulations
- Dangerous Drugs Act 1952
- Excise Act 1976 & Regulations
- Code of Criminal Procedure
- Arms Act 1960
- Prisons Act 1995
- Lockout Rules 1953
- Sales Tax Act 2018 & Regulations
- Service Tax Act 2018 & Regulations
- Anti-Money Laundering Act 2001 (AMLATFPUAA)
- Poisons Act 1952
- Free Zones Act 1990 & Regulations
- Law Reform (Abolition of Dark Samsu) Act 1976
- Goods and Services Tax Act 2014 & Regulations
- Tourism Tax Act 2017
- Anti-Trafficking in Persons and Anti-Smuggling of Migrants Act 2007 (ATIPSOM)
- Strategic Trade Act 2010
- Prohibition on Imports 2017
- Prohibition On Exports 2017
- International Trade in Endangered Species Act 2008 (CITES)
- Wildlife Conservation Act 2010
- Merchant Shipping Ordinance 1952
- Countervailing Duty and Anti-Dumping Act 1993
- Protection Act 2006
- Passport Act 1966
- Immigration Act 1959/63
- Registration of Criminals and Undesirable Persons Act 1969
- Evidence Act 1950
- Witness Protection Act 2009
- Whistleblower Protection Act 2010
- Courts of Justice Act 1964
- Federal Constitution
- Other related subsidiary legislation

== History ==
=== Early history of tax administration ===
Before any Western powers ever set foot in this land, a tax administration system had existed, that is during the heyday of the Malacca and Johor-Riau Sultanate.

In the era of the Malacca Sultanate, maritime and harbour laws existed along with matters pertaining to a tax structure involving the foreign and local merchants. During that period the tax collector and all tax-related matters were the responsibility of the Chief of the Exchequer (Penghulu Bendahari):

" ... the Chief of the Exchequer. (He) controlled all the revenue and Customs Officers and looked after the palace building and equipment". (R.J.W. Wilkinson "The Melaka Sultanate". JMBRAS VOL. XIII-Pt. 2, 1935, p. 31).

The portfolio in charge of tax collection was the harbour master (syahbandar). He was entrusted by the king with the power to enforce rules and Harbour Laws (Undang-Undang Pelabuhan). There were four harbour masters that used to handle traders from all over the world that harboured at the Malacca port:

Harbour masters	Handle traders from
Harbour Master 1	Gujerat
Harbour Master 2	China; Champa; Ryukyu Islands (From Japan onwards)
Harbour Master 3	Kalingga; Pegu; Bengal; Persia (Arabs and European as well)
Harbour Master 4	Java; Maluku; Banda; Kalimantan; Borneo; Pasai; Philippines

=== Tax administration in The Straits Settlements and Federated Malay States ===
With the establishment of the Straits Settlements (which consisted of Singapore, Penang, Malacca, Labuan and Dinding in Perak) in 1826, tax administration were supervised by a Governor and a Council directly answerable to the Governor General in Calcutta, India who was in turn controlled by the Board of Governors of the East India Company.

Even though the Straits Settlements had been established, a few tax structure and practices applied by the Malay chieftains were retained, for example the Tax Farming system. In this system, a lessee with the highest bid had the authority to collect tax. The lessee was given a license and was subject to specific rules. This facilitated the process of obtaining Excise Duty revenues.

To prevent smuggling, particularly opium, from 1861 onwards the number of police personnel were reinforced and new recruits swelled the ranks.

Even though a Customs and Excise Department had yet to exist, all customs activities were operated by a body called the Government Monopolies. This body was authorised to grant import license and process and sell certain goods such as opium, tobacco, arrack, cigarettes and matches.

At that time, excise duty were imposed on such goods as rice-wine (samsu), toddy and locally made opium whilst customs tax was imposed on opium imported from China, tobacco, cigarettes, liquor and fire crackers.

Government Monopolies, the body that controlled these customs and excise activities existed until 1937 whereby in that year the Straits Settlement Customs and Excise Department was officially launched as H.M. Customs and Excise. Following that, a Revenue Collection Branch and a Preventive Branch were set up to oversee customs and excise activities until 1937.

A station called the Coast Post was set up to place Customs Officers (at that time called Revenue Officers) who will collect tax and monitor commercial / trading activities. The Customs Department collaborated with the Harbour Master, Post Master and Immigration Department to ensure a smooth day-to-day operations.

In 1938 ship raiding were introduced to curb smuggling activities.

H.M. Customs and Excise continued until 1948 up to the extant of the Malayan Union era whereby the Federation of Malaya Customs and Excise Department were then established, covering the entire Malay Peninsula (except Singapore).

=== Taxation systems in The Federated Malay States ===
Before British intervention in the Malay States and before the Resident System was introduced, there existed a tax administration in Pahang, Perak, Selangor and Negeri Sembilan managed by the Malay chieftains. At that time, the Malay States were divided into several provinces or districts with a chieftain authorised to collect tax over the people. Among the taxes imposed were:

Commodity	Taxes imposed
Rubber	$1.00 per pikul
Animal skin	$12.50 per pikul
Tin	$4.00 per bahara
Rice	$16.00 per koyan
Tobacco	$2.00 per pikul
Opium	$4.00 per pikul
Oil	10% each type

(C.R.J. Wilkinson, Paper on Malay Subjects, O.U.P., London, 1971, p. 13)

The British had taken over tax collection from the local chieftains with the introduction of the Resident system from 1870 to 1880s. Before the formation of State Councils in the states governed by the Resident System, tax collection relied on the discretion of each Resident who is also the Sultan's Advisor. The State Council subsequently would determine all matters related to Customs tax in the states. Among the functions of the council were:

" ... Connection with the Government of the country influential natives and others with whom the Government may consult, regarding proposals for taxation, appointments, concessions, the institution or abolition of laws and other matters ...;"

Among the new taxes were:

Tin mines lease system with an export tax of $15.00 per bahara and 1/10 for other metals. Farming revenue -2.5% tax. Tax on imported opium. Systematic tax administration activities in the Malay States led to the establishment of the Customs Department. Customs stations were situated at river estuaries and state borders and were in charge of collecting duties on agricultural products, mining, alcoholic beverages, opium and gambier. The management system of the Customs Department varied from state to state.

The management of the department and tax collection were carried out by the clerks in the District Office and State Treasury Office; therefore the Customs Department did not fully manage customs and excise duty. For example, in Telok Anson, Taiping and Kuala Lumpur, tax were collected by the Government Treasurer, whilst at the ports, river estuaries as well as the borders of Perak, Selangor and Negeri Sembilan, tax collection were done by Customs Clerks who were directly responsible to the District Officers in those areas. In Selangor import tax on opium were collected by the Chinese People Affairs Protection Officers.

Customs Union in the Malay States had not existed then. This led to complication in enforcing tariff on goods and differing tax rate in the different states. As a consequence there was a need to form a federation between the Malay States and this basically had been approved by the British Foreign Secretary and Straits Settlements Governor.

With the formation of the Federated Malay States, there were efforts to integrate Customs matters between states. As an outcome, in 1904, a new legislation called the Goods Revenue Enactment Number II was enacted, with the purpose of controlling all Import tax revenue on alcoholic beverages. Under this legislation, the retailer was given a special license to import alcoholic beverages with a fixed rent payment.

On 1 January 1907, a new post of Inspector of Trade and Customs was created. On the same date, a legislation called The Customs Regulations Enactment was introduced with the approval of all four States Legislative Board. In 1908 the title of Inspector of Trade and Customs had been changed to Commissioner of Trade and Customs.

With the existence of this enactment, import and export tax schedules became uniform in the Federated Malay States. A complete integration occurred in 1920 with the establishment of one uniform Customs enactment for the Federated Malay States.

With this integration, Customs stations at the borders were abolished and no tax was imposed if the goods brought from a state to another were from the union. To collect export duty on goods that were brought out by trains, tax collecting stations were established in Singapore in 1918, Prai (1919) and Malacca (1922). The stations were also tasked with collecting duties on imported goods.

The establishment of the Customs Union in the Federated Malay States had harmonised all Customs regulations between the states. In fact, all Customs offices under the Trade Commissioner and Customs Department were responsible directly to the Chief Secretary of the Federated Malay States.

In 1938, the title Commissioner of Trade and Customs was changed to Comptroller of Customs.

=== The Establishment of Customs Union in the Malay Peninsula ===
In 1931 during the Federated Malay States Rulers Conference or Durbar in Sri Menanti, Negeri Sembilan, the British High Commissioner, Sir Cecil Clementi proposed an expansion of the union. The proposition was based on the annual increase of import tax.

Until the year 1932, Customs Tariff had already encompassed a majority of goods and preferential duty had to be created for goods coming from the British empire. The heavy reliance on import duty as a source of revenue for the Federated Malay States led Sir Cecil to opine:

"Like the rest of the British Empire, the Malay States had become increasingly dependent on Customs import duties as their main source of revenue, and it was on this score that he strongly recommended the creation of a customs union embracing the whole of the Malay peninsula if trade is not to be intolerably cramped, and the interdependence of one territory upon another in matter of commerce ".(C.R. Emerson, Malaysia a study in Direct and Indirect Role, Out 1979, p. 190).

Henceforth he suggested an establishment of a Customs Union for the whole of the Malay Peninsula. This was so that the tariff growth in the Federated Malay States would not disturb the smooth trade transactions in the states.

However, the Customs Union for the Malay Peninsula could only be established in 1946, that is with the formation of the Malayan Union in April 1946, and the department was given the name Customs and Excise of Malayan Union. Nevertheless, with the dissolution of the Malayan Union in 1948, this department was reorganised. The Customs Department then did not consist only of those under the Federated Malay States but it also included those under the administration of the Non-Federated Malay States and the Straits Settlements.

=== The Establishment of the Customs And Excise Department of the Federation of Malaya ===
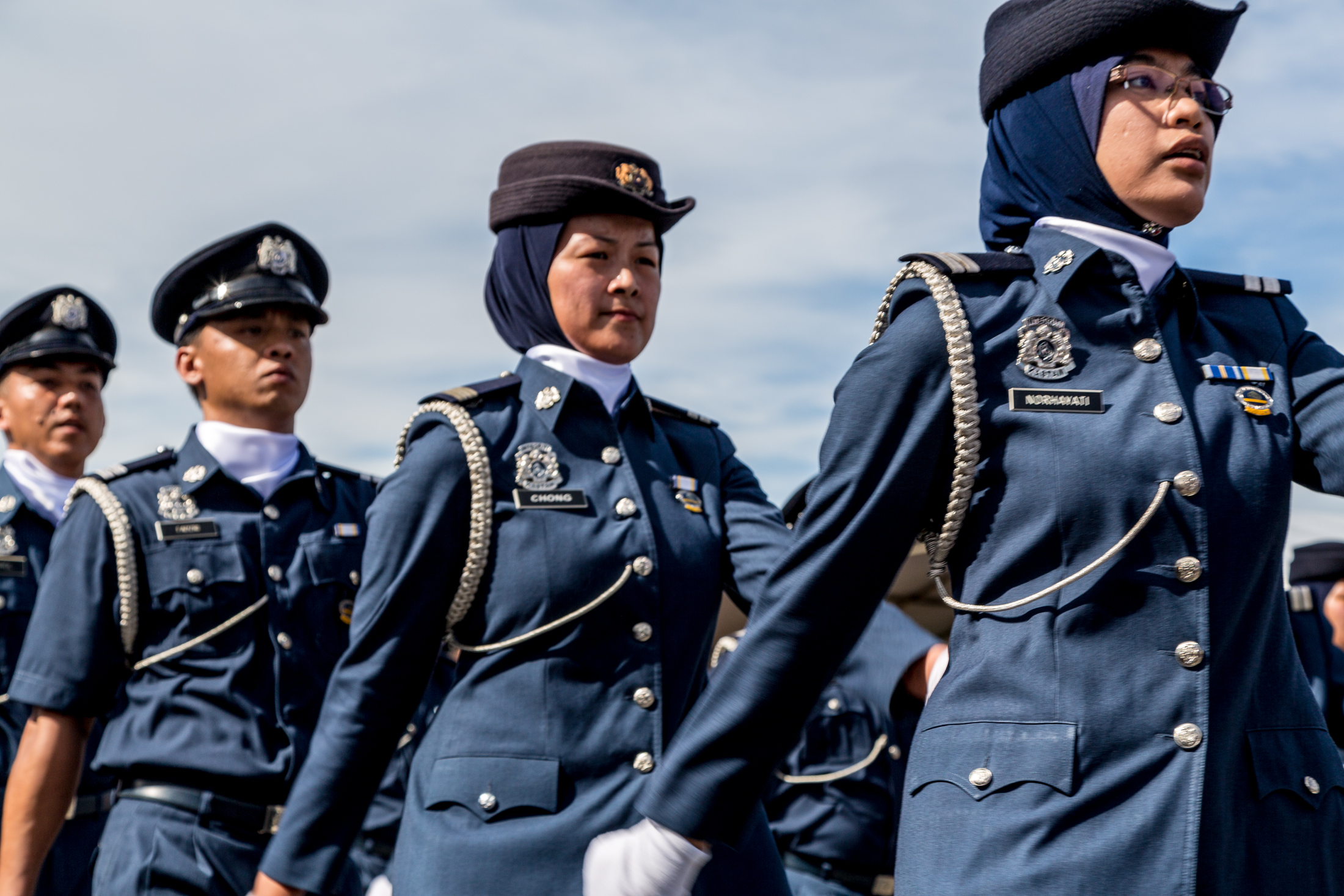
Officers of Royal Malaysian Customs

In 1948, with the formation of the Federation of Malaya, the Customs and Excise Department were established for the whole of the Malay Peninsula. Under the Customs Ordinance 1952, this department was put under the control of the High Commissioner for Malaya and headed by a Comptroller of Customs as can be found since 1938. This lasted until the country achieved its independence in 1957.

Section 138, Customs Ordinance, 1952 gave the Federation Council power to issue all rules and regulations on Customs affairs. The Customs main area at that time was the whole of Malaya excluding Penang (to maintain its free port status).

As a result, from the formation of the Customs Union in the Malay States in 1948, there was a dire need to boost staff performance to fulfill the needs of the country which was on her way to independence. In 1956 a training centre was formed in Bukit Baru, Malacca.

When the Federation of Malaya achieved its independence on 31 August 1957, the organisational structure of the Customs and Excise Department was reshuffled again to fulfill the needs of an independent Malaya. Customs and Excise Department administration was assigned under the Finance Ministry led by a Customs and Excise Comptroller who was responsible to the Finance Minister.

The department was divided into three zones based on three main trading centres. For the Northern Zone the base was in Penang and covered Kedah, Perlis and Perak. The Central Zone was based in Kuala Lumpur and its area encompassed Terengganu, Kelantan and Negeri Sembilan. Lastly, the Southern Zone comprised the remaining states of Johor, Pahang, Malacca and the Customs station in Singapore. Each Zone was led by a Senior Assistant Comptroller of Customs.

=== Development, Progression of Royal Malaysian Customs and Excise Department ===
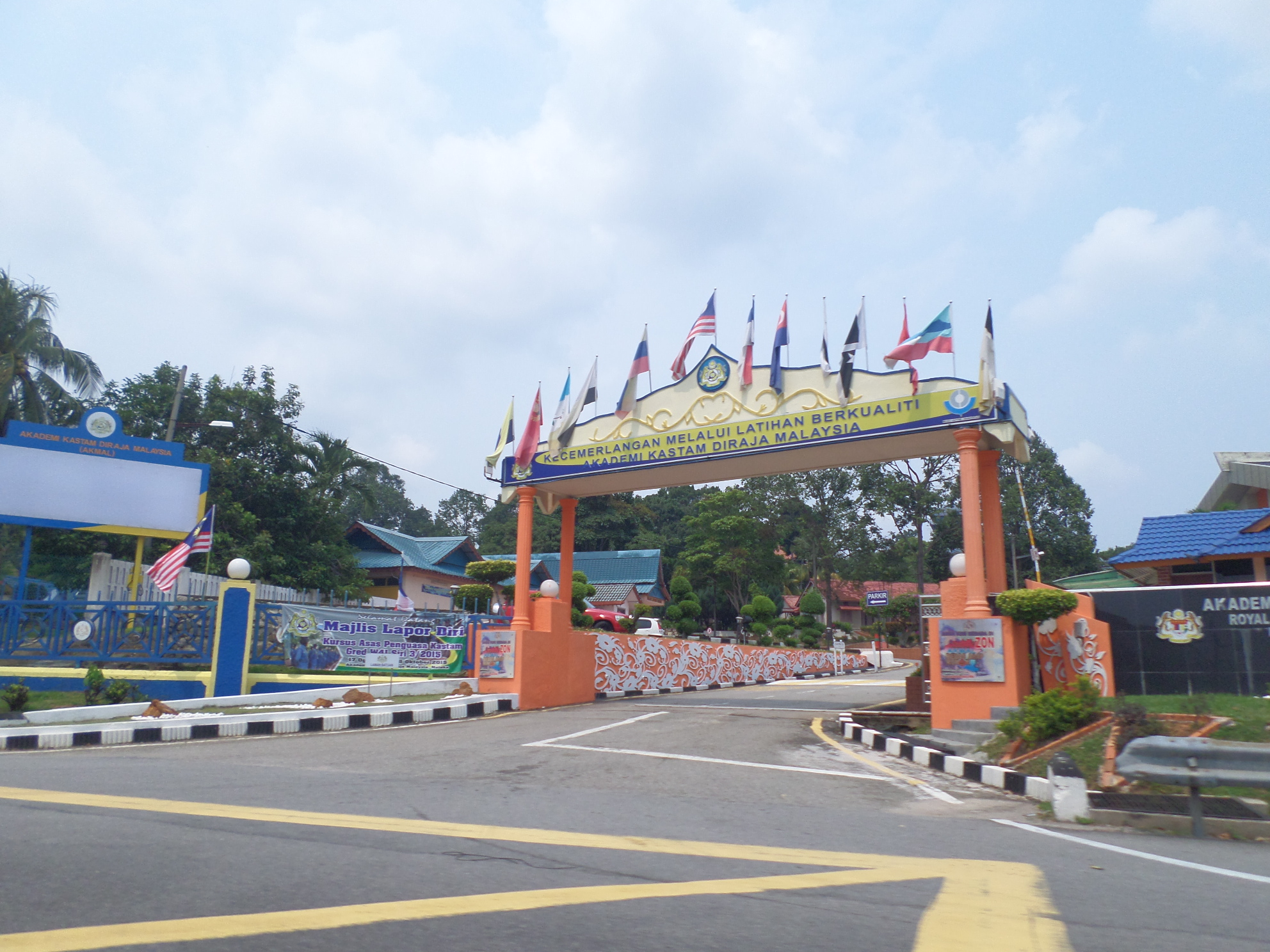
Royal Malaysian Customs Academy in Malacca

On 16 September 1963, the structure of the Customs and Excise Department administration was reshuffled again with the inclusion of Sabah, Sarawak and Singapore into Malaysia. The Customs department was divided into three main territories, that is the Peninsular Malaysia (West Malaysia), Sabah and Sarawak, where each territory were led by a Regional Comptroller of Customs and Excise.

On Tuesday, 29 October 1963, in the Dewan Tunku Abdul Rahman, Jalan Ampang, Kuala Lumpur, an auspicious event unfurled as the Customs and Excise Department was conferred the title Diraja / Royal by HRH Seri Paduka Baginda Di Pertuan Agong. This was an honour from the Government for the department's untold contribution to the country. It was a momentous occasion in the history of the Royal Customs and Excise of Malaysia.

Amendment to the Customs Ordinance 1952, enforced on 1 October 1964, had annulled the posts of Revenue Officer and Junior Customs Officer, and in its stead new posts were introduced called Customs Officer, Senior Customs Officer and Chief Customs Officer. Beside that, this amendment also created the posts of Assistant Superintendent of Customs and Superintendent of Customs.

1964 also saw an all local selection of Customs Officers upon service completion of the last two English officials.

Even though the Peninsular Malaysia, Sabah and Sarawak were contained in Malaysia, each state still worked under separate Customs Ordinances and Duty Orders. These affected the movement of goods from one territory to the other thus creating a bumpy journey through the different bureaucracies. Following these difficulties the Comptrollers from the three territories met in mid 1967.

A result of the meeting was the enactment of the Customs Act No. 62, 1967 that gave the whole of Malaysia a single Customs law. Consequently, the Indirect Tax Committee of the Treasury actively prepared a collective tariff for the three zones.

In 1972, the Royal Customs and Excise Malaysia were involved in a restructuring exercise following a report by an expert from the International Monetary Fund (IMF). On 1 August 1972, the title for the head of Customs Department was changed to Director General of Customs and Excise; and two new posts were created, that is the Deputy Director General of Customs (Implementation) and Deputy Director General of Customs (Management). From that date onwards, the position of Regional Comptroller of Customs and Excise (West Malaysia) was abolished and replaced with one Regional Customs Director each for the three areas, North, Central and South which were previously led by a Senior Assistant Customs Director.

In 1972, a revenue legislation called the Sales Tax Act 1972 was declared in the Government Gazette as Malaysia Law Act 64 and implemented on 29 February 1972. This tax, known as Sales Tax, was imposed on all imported and local products, except those exempted under Sales Tax (Exemption) Order 1972, or were produced by manufacturers exempted from being licensed under Sale Tax (Licence Exemption) Order 1972.

Accordingly, in 1975, the Government introduced yet another law called the Service Tax Act 1975. This enabled the department to collect service tax from business premises that provided services and goods which were taxed under the Second Schedule, Service Tax Regulations, 1975.

The enforcement of the Motor Vehicle Levy Act taking effect on 1 January 1984 also contributed towards increasing the department's revenue collection. With the enforcement, all motor vehicles ferrying certain goods either leaving or entering the country, notwithstanding laden or empty, (unless those exempted) will be levied.

Until the year 1977, even though Malaysia had existed for 14 years, there were still a few minor legislations in the three Customs controlled territories which operated separately. Research was done so that only one legislation is used in the regions of the Malay Peninsula, Sabah and Sarawak. The movement was called the Harmonisation Movement. The first benefit reaped was that movement of goods from one territory to another will no longer be considered as import or export; and goods will only be taxed once, that is when the goods were imported or exported for the first time from Malaysia. This means business transactions between territories can proceed unhindered.

On 19 December 1977, Penang was declared as a Main Customs Area. With that, Penang's free port status was withdrawn. The year also saw the department embracing the International Unit System or SI, converting everything into metric by 1 January 1978 through the Customs Duty Order 1978.

The Customs Department had another restructuring exercise in 1979. Whilst continuing to be helmed by the Director General of Customs, he was now assisted by three Deputy Director Generals who would be responsible for the Implementation, Prevention as well as Management and Policy programmes. Organisational structure at the headquarters level was arranged based on regional activity whereby each activity was headed by a Director of Customs. The activities were the Prevention Division, Customs, Internal Tax, Research, Planning and Training, Revenue Collection as well as General Administration and Finance. The same applied at state level where each state in Malaysia were led by a Director of Customs. In addition, the department also had a station in Singapore administered by a Federation Customs Tax Collector.

In 1983, history was made when, for the first time ever, the Royal Malaysian Customs and Excise Department celebrated World Customs Day. The date 26 January was chosen to coincide with the 30th anniversary of the Customs Cooperation Council (now known as the World Customs Organization or WCO for short). The first Customs Day celebration was inaugurated by the Honourable Minister of Finance on the compound of the Royal Customs and Excise Malaysia Training College (now Royal Malaysian Customs Academy).

1987 saw Langkawi declared detached from the Main Customs Area and made the second free port in Malaysia after Labuan. Free port status was conferred on the island beginning 1 January 1987 to encourage tourism in Langkawi (which had not been developed accordingly) wherewith it would increase the standard of living of the local people.

To equip the department with the required work force, the Royal Malaysian Customs College was established in August 1956 (formerly known as the Federal Customs Training Center, Federal Customs Training School and Royal Customs Training College).

After several years of going through the research and planning process, in 1989 the college was expanded. Now it is known as the Royal Malaysian Customs Academy (Akademi Kastam Diraja Malaysia or AKMAL, meaning 'perfect').

Beginning 1 January 1990, another event was chalked in the Customs annals, state of Perlis was given a new Customs administration independently. Previously, the Perlis Customs came under the auspices of the State Customs Director of Kedah and Perlis with Alor Setar, in Kedah as the headquarters. With the establishment of the new Customs administration, all activities and Customs affairs could be run more smoothly in the state of Perlis.

In 1995, the Royal Malaysian Customs and Excise Department once again reorganised its structure. At the top-level management, the status quo was retained whereby the Director General of Customs, aided by his three deputies, spearheaded the Implementation, Prevention and Management Programme. A new programme was introduced called the Corporate Planning and Development Programme. However this programme could only be found at the Headquarters level. In tandem with that, Customs activities in the Headquarters were arranged thus: (i) Customs, Internal Tax and Technique Service- under the Implementation Programme. (ii) Preventive - under the Preventive Programme. (iii)Personnel and Administrative, Finance and Procurement, Management Information System and Revenue Accounting - under the Management Programme. (iv)Corporate Planning and AKMAL- under the Corporate Planning and Development Programme.

Each of these activities is led by a Director of Customs. The post of State Director of Customs in the states remained. The same goes for the Federal Customs Tax Collector in Singapore and Customs Advisory Minister in Brussels, Belgium. Beside that, to create a greater impact for the department, the Public Relations Unit, Internal Audit Unit and Legal Affairs are assigned directly under the Director General of Customs.

On 23 October 1998, the Right Honourable Prime Minister who was also the Minister of Finance I, in his speech for the Budget of 1999 in the Dewan Rakyat, announced a levy on windfall profit imposed beginning 1 January 1999 to help the government secure added revenue. Windfall profit is a surplus profit whereby a higher selling price occurred as a consequence of the Ringgit depreciation riding on the backlash of the economic crisis that hit the country since the middle of 1997. The first commodity to be slapped by this levy is crude palm oil where levy is imposed when the price exceeds RM2, 000 per tonne.

== Organisation ==
=== Enforcement Division ===
Functions of Enforcement Division include:

1. Carry out intelligence operations on smuggling activities to increase enforcement against smuggling and irregularities.
2. Carry out operations to eradicate smuggling in an integrated and coordinated manner through land and sea patrols, road blocks and inspection of suspected premises and outlets.
3. Carry out investigations on smuggling activities as a result of information received, public complaints or intelligence reports and to complete investigations in the stipulated time frame.
4. Carry out operations against targets or smuggling black areas to wipe out syndicate through raids, searches, operations and propaganda.
5. Open investigation papers on cases obtained for punitive action either through court prosecution or offer of compound.
6. Manage the storage and disposal of seized goods efficiently.
7. Carry out anti smuggling campaigns to give awareness to the public regarding dangers of smuggling and build cooperation and networking with other local and overseas enforcement agencies.
8. Carry out enforcement tasks against offences involving Intellectual Property Rights (IPR), Drug act, Anti Money Laundering and Terrorist Financing Act 2001, Anti Trafficking in Persons Act 2007, and Weapons of Mass Destruction (WMD).
9. Carry out drug detection and enforcement in all land, sea and air entry gates of the country.

=== Compliance Management Division ===
Functions of Compliance Management Division include:

1. To conduct systematic, efficient and effective audits on licensees / importers
2. To ensure that taxes are collected properly and accurately to avoid loss of revenue.
3. To monitor and coordinate the audit activities in the states and evaluate the effectiveness of the audit programmes.
4. To review and evaluate the implementation of audit procedures for the purpose of improvement.
5. To analyze the results of audits to determine the cause of non-compliance of the laws and regulations.
6. To ensure that licensees / importers understand and comply with legislation and regulations related to customs.
7. To conduct investigative audit on licensees / importers involving fraud and to take legal actions appropriately.
8. To perform special audits / raids on licensees / importers for cases from complaints / information received.

=== Customs Division ===
Functions of Customs Division include:

1. Warehousing Management And Control Unit
2. Facilities and Incentives Management And Control Unit
3. Licensing Data Base Management Unit
4. Free Industrial and Commercial Zones Management And Control Unit
5. Licensed Manufacturing Warehouse Management And Control Unit
6. Import Management and Enforcement Unit
7. Export Management and Enforcement Unit
8. Duty Free Island(DFI)/Duty Free Shops(DFS) Management and Enforcement Unit
9. Travellers / Border Management And Enforcement Unit
10. Taxation Policy and Analysis Unit
11. Inter Agencies Commitment Unit

=== Internal Tax Division ===
Functions of Internal Tax Division include:

1. To study the domestic tax policy on sales tax and the implementation of sales tax.
2. To study the domestic tax policy on service tax and the implementation of service tax.
3. To control and monitor the implementation of sales tax and service tax involving registration, statement and payment of taxes.
4. To control and monitor the facilities, exemptions and verification (pre / post) on facilities included Tax Deduction Facilities (Contra), Disposal, Refund (refund), Return (drawback), Remission, exemption facilities Schedule A, B and C Sales Tax Order (People Exempt From Tax Payment) 2018, coordinate consultation programs with government agencies, private sector and industry etc.
5. To study and analyze industry risks by providing indicators through sales tax and service tax statements as well as providing performance analysis of each industry under sales tax and service tax scientifically using analytical data.
6. To review and propose amendments to sales tax legislation, service tax and tourism tax to the Ministry of Finance, conduct legal studies and give briefings on domestic tax legislation that has been gazetted to citizens, the public and industry. Also responsible for reviewing and processing applications related to Customs Ruling as well as being the secretariat of Private Technical Meetings at the CDN Division level, CDN Internal Technical Meetings and CDN Customs Ruling Panel Meetings.
7. To review and confirm GST treatment related to auditing issues and tribunal cases, process applications for GST transition issues after the repeal of the Goods and Services Tax Act from 1 September 2018 and monitor the Gentax system. Manage and monitor the registration, payment statements and policy issues and implementation of tourism tax in addition to processing the application for remission and return of tourism tax under the Tourism Tax Act 2017.
8. To account for tax revenue receipts (local) for Sales Tax (CJ), Service Tax (CP), Goods and Services Tax (GST), Tourism Tax (TTx) and Digital Services Tax (CPD) etc.

=== Technical Services Division ===
Functions of Technical Services Division include:

1. Providing advice on the valuation and classification of goods.
2. Updating the laws, regulations and orders administered by the department.
3. Monitoring revenues and arrears are accurately accounted for.
4. Processing appeals on drawback and refunds.
5. Processing subsidies of petroleum products
6. Assessing and targeting high risk consignment at entry points.

=== Management Services and Human Resources Division ===
Functions of Management Services and Human Resources Division include:

1. Administer and manage human resources and finance management affairs of the Department
2. Develop the department by means of studying and planning the optimal human resources needs
3. Manage the human resources in terms of recruitment, promotion and placement of the personnel of the Department
4. Manage the evaluation of the performance of the department's personnel in terms of the Annual Performance Evaluation Report and the Human Resource Development Panel Meeting
5. Manage the planning of the Department's procurement
6. Manage the development planning under the Malaysia Plan and the implementation of the department's development projects
7. Manage the budget planning and the financial allocation for the Management Budget Estimation and the Development Budget Estimation of the Department
8. Manage the account of the Department
9. Formulate and update orders and circulars relating to human resources, administrative, services and financial affairs
10. Implement the auditing program to the states and provide advisory services over human resources and financial affairs

=== Corporate Planning Division ===
Functions of Corporate Planning Division include:

1. To strengthen the relationship and cooperation between the Royal Malaysian Customs Department and other Customs Administrations to enable effective information sharing in line with international customs practices.
2. To enhance service delivery system of the Royal Malaysian Customs Department through research and development and coordination of quality, innovation and productivity programmes.
3. To implement organizational reform and modernization in line with public service and government policy.
4. To enhance image of the Royal Malaysian Customs Department through corporate communications and public relations management.
5. Organize and coordinate top-level management of the department meeting, audit queries and proposals for new potential taxes.

=== Legal Division ===
Functions of Legal Division include:

1. To conduct criminal trial, appeal and revision in courts in the whole Malaysia.
2. To conduct civil trial, appeal and judicial review in courts in the whole Malaysia.
3. To study and review the investigation papers forwarded to this division for order, advice and consent to prosecute.
4. To study and review civil case papers forwarded to this division for the purpose of filing of the statement of claim, defence, affidavits or for advice and action in courts.
5. To revise and study agreements between RMCD with local private sector and agreements between RMCD in representing Malaysia at the international level.
6. To give legal advice and opinion to the Customs officers and divisions in RMCD.
7. To study and review every court's decision whether criminal or civil to determine whether to file an appeal against the decision or not.
8. To give lectures to the Customs officers with regards to Customs law and for Competency Level Assessment courses.

=== Information Technology Division ===
Functions of Information Technology Division include:

1. To planned and implement the Department's ICT strategy and Policy
2. To design, develop, implement and maintain application systems based on JKDM ICT Strategic Plan
3. To provide, manage and maintain the Department's ICT infrastructure especially in security aspects.
4. To Monitor and evaluate the effectiveness of existing ICT projects to determine its benefit and suitability in supporting the operational and management functions of the Department
5. To manage daily operations of the Data Center and plan and implement all matters pertaining to the safety of Department's Data Center.
6. To provide ICT technical advice and assistance to all system users.
7. To implement ICT training and programs continuously among the staffs.

=== Integrity Branch ===
Functions of Integrity Branch include:

1. Ensure best governance is implemented.
2. Ensure the culture, institutionalization and implementation of integrity in the organization.
3. Detect and confirm complaints of criminal misconduct as well as violations of the code of conduct and ethics of the organization as well as report criminal misconduct to the responsible enforcement agency.
4. Receive and take action on complaints / information on criminal misconduct as well as violations of organizational code of conduct and ethics.
5. Ensure compliance with applicable laws and regulations.
6. Implement the secretariat function of the Disciplinary Board

=== Akademi Kastam Diraja Malaysia (AKMAL) ===
Federal Customs Training Centre consists of two building blocks for the office, classroom and dormitory buildings. AKMAL's main campus is situated in Bukit Baru Melaka. There are four (5) branches, namely AKMAL Sabah, AKMAL Sarawak, AKMAL Bukit Malut Langkawi and AKMAL Rantau Panjang Kelantan & AKMAL Tg. Surat Johor.

=== Specialised units ===
==== Customs Operational Battle Force Response Assault (COBRA) ====
The Royal Malaysian Customs Department (RMCD) established the Customs Operational Battle Force Response Assault (COBRA) in 2016 after the murder of the Deputy Director General of Customs (Customs/Inland Revenue) who was shot dead while on his way to his office in Putrajaya. on April 26, 2013.

COBRA functions as an attacker and protector of the RMCD Enforcement Division, especially in dealing with high-risk cases following the increase in threats especially to Enforcement Division officers such as death threats, obstruction, members being run over while carrying out tasks, houses and vehicles belonging to officers being burned, houses and vehicles belonging to officers being splashed with paint as well as including tonto interference.

COBRA is based at RMCD Headquarters (Putrajaya).

In addition to acting as a strike and support team for officers and members working on the front line (frontliner), COBRA is also assigned as a protector and escort to RMCD's highest officers (top management). Next, COBRA was also tasked with protecting important RMCD assets including marine bases and boat assets that are of interest to the syndicate.

The first batch of recruitment was carried out in 2016 with 23 officers and members who successfully completed the COBRA basic course. While the second series of recruitment was carried out in 2021 with 41 officers and members who successfully completed the COBRA basic course.

For both recruitment series, COBRA members underwent training at the Ulu Kinta Perak General Operations Training Center (PLPGA) where COBRA members were exposed to various forms of skills including shooting, combat medicine, "close quarter battle" (CQB), raids houses and buildings and operations at sea (marine).

The Cobra Tactical Training Center located at JKDM Perlis has been fully operational in training members covering aspects of raids, intelligence, weaponry, medicine, self-defense skills which they are trained by special forces operators in Malaysia.

RMCD is planning to increase COBRA membership to a total of 205 people to be placed in high-risk areas with smuggling crimes.

==== Customs Contraband Enforcement Team (CCET) ====
The Customs Contraband Enforcement Team or better known as the Customs Contraband Enforcement Team (CCET) was established in 2015 to fight the crime of smuggling on land and sea based in AKMAL Melaka.

CCET is involved in marine operations at the international level, which is the Indonesian and Malaysian Customs Coordinated Sea Patrol Operation (PATKOR KASTIMA) and also operations with other Divisions in JKDM in addition to performances in PATKOR KASTIMA, Langkawi International Maritime and Aerospace Exhibition (LIMA), World Customs Day (HKS) and others.

CCET members are exposed to a variety of skills in carrying out their duties including "close quarter battle" (CQB), shooting, T-Baton, martial arts and so on.

==== Smuggling Investigation Unit ====
The Trade Fraud Investigation Unit (USFP) is responsible for investigating criminal cases of smuggling and embezzlement involving all commodities/goods such as cigarettes, liquor, drugs (narcotics), firecrackers and others.

USFP is available in every state RMCD and Headquarters RMCD.

The Investigating Officer (IO) of the USFP is involved in the remand application against the suspect, the investigation process and the submission of the Investigation Paper (IP) to the Deputy Public Prosecutor for further instructions such as court charges.

The investigation carried out by the USFP involved all the legislation administered by the RMCD including the Customs Act 1967, the Excise Act 1976, the Dangerous Drugs Act 1952, the ATIPSOM Act 2007, the CITES Act 2008, the Illegal Samsu Act 1976, the Poisons Act 1952 and so on.

==== Fraud Document Investigation Unit ====
The Document Fraud Investigation Unit (USFD) is responsible for investigating cases of document fraud. USFD is in every state RMCD and Headquarters RMCD.

The Investigating Officer (IO) of the USFD is involved in the remand application against the suspect, the investigation process and the submission of the Investigation Paper (IP) to the Deputy Public Prosecutor for further instructions such as court charges.

The investigation conducted by the USFD involves all legislation administered by the RMCD including the Customs Act 1967, the Excise Act 1976, the Sales Tax Act 2018, the Service Tax Act 2018 and so on.

==== Money Laundering Investigation Unit ====
The Money Laundering Investigation Unit (USPWH) is responsible for conducting investigations into all serious offenses listed in the second schedule of the Anti-Money Laundering, Anti-Terrorist Financing and Proceeds of Illegal Activities Act 2001 involving the cross-border transfer of cash and bearer negotiable instruments. USPWH is only based at RMCD Headquarters.

The Investigating Officer (IO) of the USPWH is involved in the remand application against the suspect, the investigation process and the submission of the Investigation Paper (IP) to the Deputy Public Prosecutor for further instructions such as court charges.

The investigation conducted by the USFD involves legislation administered by the RMCD namely the Money Laundering Prevention Act 2001 (AMLATFPUAA).

==== Internal Investigation Unit (USD) / Special Investigation Branch (CSK) ====
The Internal Investigation Unit (USD) or better known as the Special Investigation Branch (CSK) was established on 01 January 2019 with a strength of 20 Senior JKDM Officers led by a Senior Assistant Director of Customs I (PKPK I) WK52.

The focus of this unit is to deal with the problem of smuggling, embezzlement and misconduct, especially involving the integrity of the Customs Officers themselves. USD/CSK will report their work directly to the Director General of Customs (KPK).T

he offense section in the Customs Act 1967 that is popularly enforced by this unit is Section 137 of the Customs Act 1967 which is the penalty for offering or accepting a bribe.

The punishment for the offense of Section 137 of the Customs Act 1967 is imprisonment for a period not exceeding 5 years or a fine not exceeding RM500,000.00 or both. And the person accused/convicted under Section 137 of the Customs Act 1967 will be detained from holding a position in the public service of the federal government or any state government.

==== X-ray Scanning Machine Unit (Scanner) ====
The World Customs Organization (WCO) SAFE Framework of Standards to Secure and Facilitate Global Trade stipulates that inspection equipment such as scanners should be provided and used by the Royal Malaysian Customs Department (JKDM).

This tool can assist JKDM in ensuring that imported and exported goods pledged as well as duties/taxes paid are correct in addition to detecting and preventing dangerous/prohibited goods such as drugs and firearms, without disrupting the flow of legitimate trade.

The use of scanning machines is necessary to reduce the physical inspection of imported and exported goods in order to speed up the clearance of the goods from Customs control.

JKDM has started using scanners since 2001 to scan the contents of imported/exported cargo and check passengers at airports, borders and ports/piers. There are three types of scanners: cargo scanners, baggage scanners, and body scanners.

The function of the scanning machine is to ensure that the types of goods scanned are as promised, detect prohibited goods or high-risk goods from entering the country, and curb smuggling or tax evasion activities.

==== Customs Narcotics K9 Dog Training & Control Unit ====
The K9 Drug Detection Dog Unit (APD) was established in 1978 by the Royal Malaysian Customs Department.

JKDM's K9 Unit is placed under the Enforcement Division, Narcotics Branch to assist the JKDM Narcotics Branch to detect drugs hidden in secret or difficult to detect rooms.

At the beginning of the establishment of the JKDM K9 unit, 6 drug detection dogs were supplied by the United States Customs and 4 drug detection dogs were donated by the Australian Bureau of Narcotics.

4 Customs Officers who were the initial nucleus team for the establishment of the JKDM K9 Unit were sent to attend a drug detection dog handling course in Front Royal Virginia, USA.

This unit is focused on combating drug smuggling and distribution which has become more widespread lately with the help of scanners.

Currently, the dog breeds used by this unit are German Shepherd and Belgian Shepherd. Most of the drug detection dogs of the JKDM K9 Unit are bred locally to save costs. JKDM's K9 unit regularly cooperates with domestic and foreign agencies such as Japan Customs (JICA) in empowering the human capital of K9 dog trainers/handlers.

In addition, the JKDM K9 Unit is also regularly invited to give demonstrations and explanations about the dangers of drugs in schools as well as government department open days.

The total assets of detection dogs (K9) owned by the JKDM K9 Unit are currently 37 drug detection dogs and 2 tobacco detection dogs.

==== Customs Marine Unit ====
According to written records, the Customs Marine Unit has existed since 1917. The Customs Marine Unit is under the Enforcement Division and was established to combat the crime of smuggling at sea.

On September 20, 2020, there was an anxious moment of exchange of fire between the JKDM Marine Unit and smugglers in Bohey Dulang Waters, Sabah. Post-COVID-19, the Customs Marine Unit has been actively involved in Op Benteng Laut (OBL) to curb the entry of Illegal Immigrants (PATI), contraband and the spread of the COVID-19 epidemic itself.

The acquisition of cases obtained by the Customs Marine Unit at this time does not only involve cases of cigarette and liquor smuggling under the Customs Act and the Excise Act, now the acquisition of cases by this unit is diversified such as cases under the ATIPSOM Act (smuggling and human trafficking ), CITES Act (wildlife smuggling), Dangerous Drugs Act and other legislation administered by JKDM.

The procurement of 32 units of High Speed Patrol Boats in 2021 and 2022 supplied by the Malaysian Government to all marine Customs bases can increase the ability of these units to carry out tasks more effectively and with high impact.

Not only enforcement duties, the Customs Marine Unit is also actively involved in various CSR missions such as rescue assistance for victims trapped in floods on the East Coast, assistance in finding and rescuing victims suspected of drowning at sea, rescue missions for boat capsized victims at sea and so on.

== Equipment ==
=== Firearms ===
Model	Variants	Type	Origin
Glock	17, 19, 26, 43	Semi-automatic pistol	Austria
CZ P-07		Semi-automatic pistol	Czech Republic
Walther P99		Semi-automatic pistol	Germany
Benelli M4		Shotgun	Italy
Heckler & Koch MP5		Submachine gun	Germany Turkey
CZ Scorpion Evo 3		Submachine gun	Czech Republic
M4 carbine		Assault rifle	United States

==== Retired Weapons ====
Model	Type	Origin
Smith & Wesson Model 36	Revolver	United States
Webley Revolver	Revolver	United Kingdom
Beretta 92	Semi-automatic pistol	Italy
Sten	Submachine gun	United Kingdom
Sterling submachine gun	Submachine gun	United Kingdom
L1A1 Self-Loading Rifle	Battle rifle	United Kingdom
Remington 870	Shotgun	United States

==== Vessels ====
No.	Boat/Ship Name	Type of Boat/Ship	No.of Boat/Ship	Speed	Draft	Length	Engine	Helm/Rudder
1.	Penumpas Siri 7	Fast Patrol Craft (FPC)	Classified	45 knot	0.59 m	12 m	Classified	House / Aircond
2.	Penumpas Siri 6 (Aluminium)	Fast Patrol Craft (FPC)	Classified	45 knot	0.59 m	12 m	Classified	House / Aircond
3.	Penumpas Siri 5	Fast Patrol Craft (FPC)	Classified	50 knot	0.55 m	12 m	Classified	Open
4.	Penumpas Siri 4	Fast Patrol Craft (FPC)	Classified	60 knot	0.7 m	13 m	Classified	Open
5.	Penumpas Siri 3	Fast Patrol Craft (FPC)	Classified	55 knot	0.55 m	9.50 m	Classified	Open
6.	Perantas Siri 9	Fast Interceptor Craft (FIC)	Classified	60 knot	0.98 m	16.5 m	Classified	Open
7.	Perantas Siri 8	Fast Interceptor Craft (FIC)	-	-	-	15.25-16 m	-	-
8.	Perantas Siri 7	Fast Interceptor Craft (FIC)	-	-	-	15.25 - 16 m	-	-
9.	Pemintas	Fast Patrol Craft (FPC)	-	45 knot	0.60 m	10.93 m	-	-
10.	Risik	-	-	-	-	6.5 - 9.5 m	-	-
11.	Bahtera Jerai	Bahtera Class	Hand over to Malaysia Maritime Enforcement Agency (MMEA)	20 knot	-	32 m	2 Paxman Valenta 16 Diesel	-
12.	Bahtera Juang	Bahtera Class	Hand over to Malaysia Maritime Enforcement Agency (MMEA)	20 knot	-	32 m	2 Paxman Valenta 16 Diesel	-
13.	Bahtera Perak	Bahtera Class	Hand over to Malaysia Maritime Enforcement Agency (MMEA)	20 knot	-	32 m	2 Paxman Valenta 16 Diesel	-
14.	Bahtera Hijau	Bahtera Class	Hand over to Malaysia Maritime Enforcement Agency (MMEA)	20 knot	-	32 m	2 Paxman Valenta 16 Diesel	-
15.	Bahtera Pulai	Bahtera Class	-	20 knot	-	32 m	2 Paxman Valenta 16 Diesel	-
16.	Bahtera Bayu	Bahtera Class	Hand over to Malaysia Maritime Enforcement Agency (MMEA)	20 knot	-	32 m	2 Paxman Valenta 16 Diesel	-
17.	Pembanteras Johan	Pembanteras Class	Hand over to Malaysia Maritime Enforcement Agency (MMEA)	-	-	22 m	-	-
18.	Pembanteras Jaguh	Pembanteras Class	-	-	-	22 m	-	-
19.	Pembanteras Juara	Pembanteras Class	-	-	-	22 m	-	-
20.	Bot Ronda	Bot Ronda	10 Buah	-	-	13.5 m	-	
21.	Bot Pelabuhan	Bot Pelabuhan	2 Buah	-	-	11 m	-	
