= Bandar Baru Sentul =

Township in Kuala Lumpur, Malaysia

Coordinates: 3°10′50″N 101°41′50″E

Bandar Baru Sentul

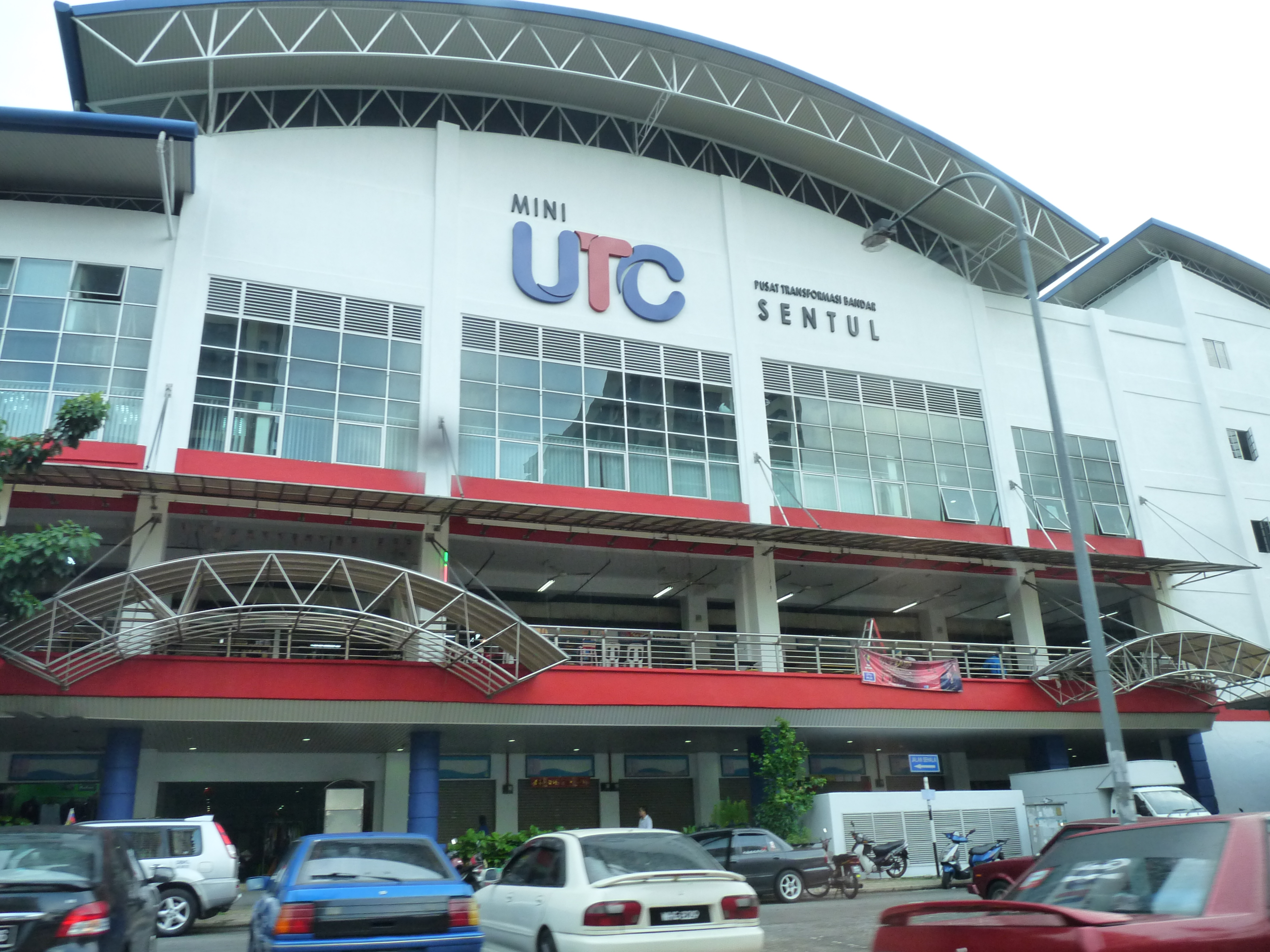
Mini UTC Sentul at Bandar Baru Sentul

Bandar Baru Sentul, also known as Sentul Perdana, is a major area located within the east side of the suburb of Sentul, Kuala Lumpur.

== History ==
The main mosque in the area, Amru Ibni Al'As Mosque, was constructed in 1995 and opened on 18 August 1997. As of 2018, the mosque considered soliciting donations for the repainting of its dome.

Creative Learning and IT Centre (CLiC), located at UTC Sentul, opened in August 2014 at a cost of RM 2 million. The centre is a collaboration of Sentul Raya Sdn Bhd, Kuala Lumpur City Hall and the Ministry of Education.
