= 2010 in Malaysia =

- Decades: 1990s; 2000s; 2010s; 2020s
- See also: Other events of 2010; History of Malaysia • Timeline • Years

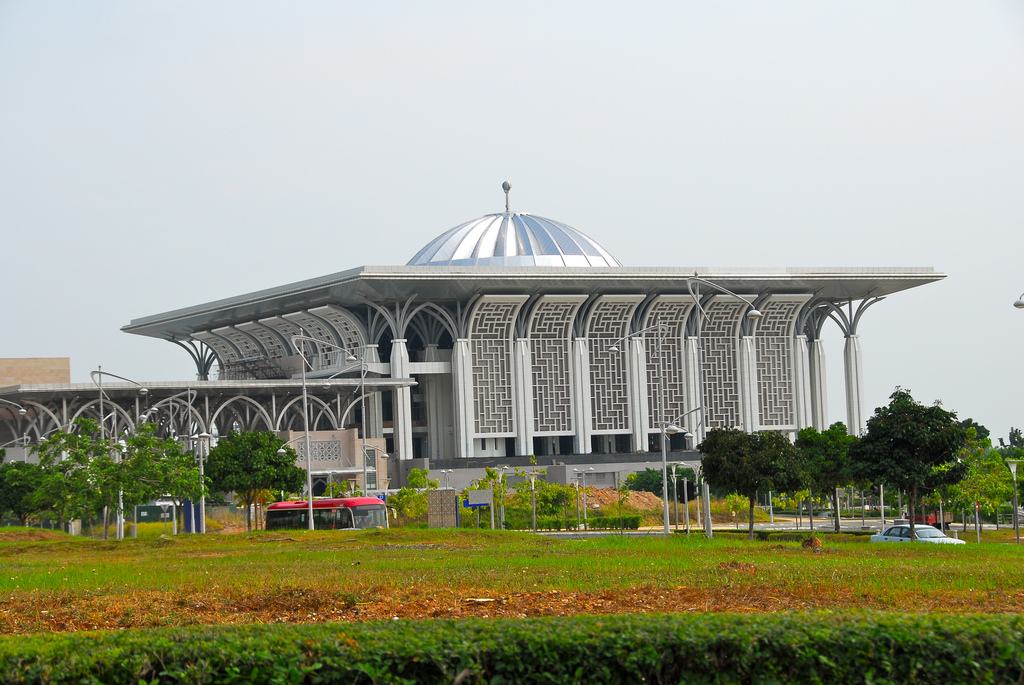
Tuanku Mizan Zainal Abidin Mosque (Iron Mosque) in Putrajaya, Malaysia.

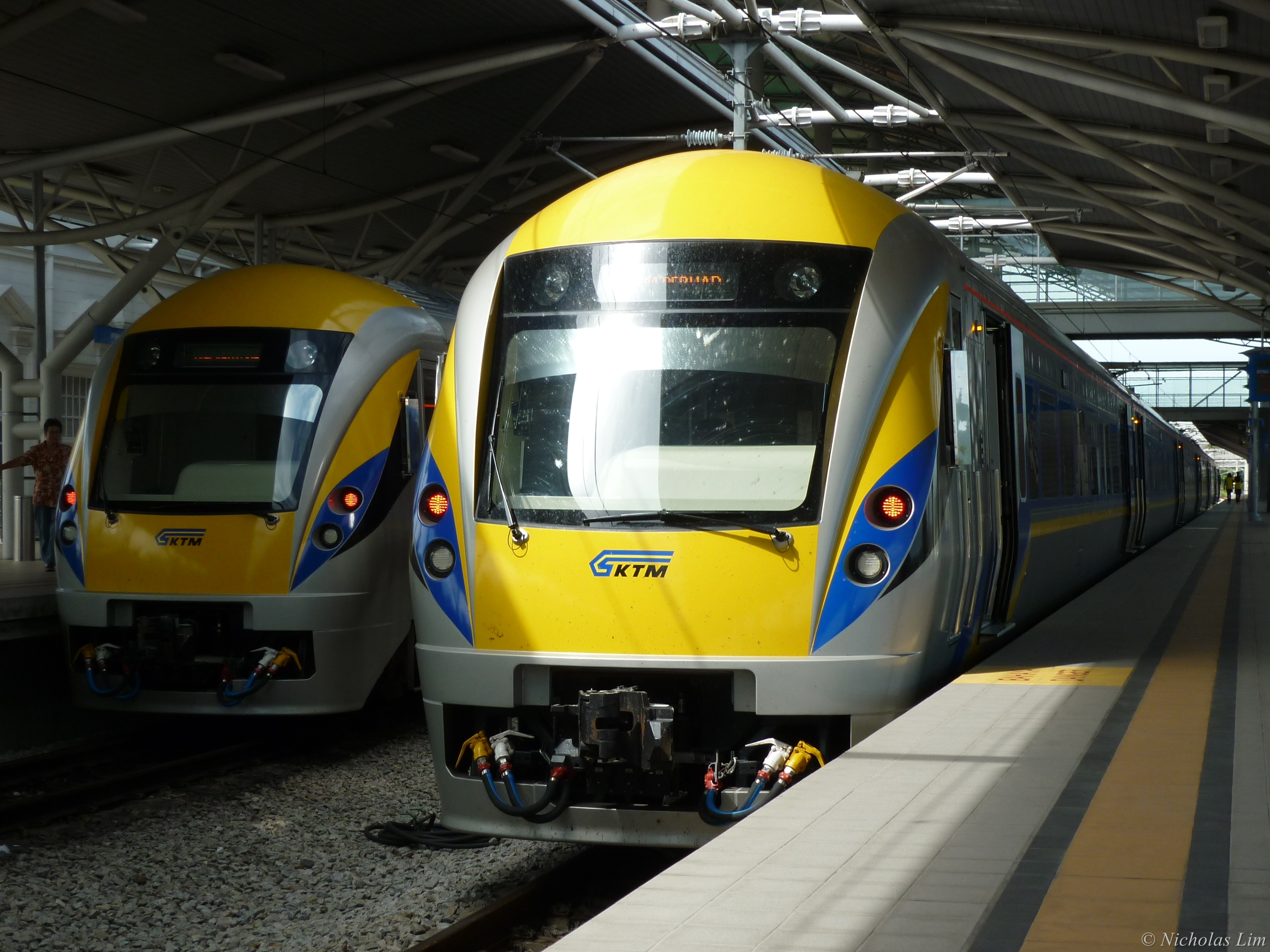
The Electric Train Service (ETS) Express.

This article lists important figures and events in Malaysian public affairs during the year 2010, together with the deaths of notable Malaysians. 2010 marked is 53rd anniversary of Malaysia's Independence, 16 September was celebrated as a national holiday for the first time of Malaysia Day.

== Incumbent political figures ==
=== Federal level ===
- Yang di-Pertuan Agong: Sultan Mizan Zainal Abidin of Terengganu
- Raja Permaisuri Agong: Sultanah Nur Zahirah of Terengganu
- Deputy Yang di-Pertuan Agong: Sultan Abdul Halim Mu'adzam Shah of Kedah
- Prime Minister: Dato' Sri Mohammad Najib Abdul Razak
- Deputy Prime Minister: Tan Sri Dato' Haji Muhyiddin Yassin
- President of the Dewan Negara:
  - Tan Sri Ir. Wong Foon Meng (until 12 April)
  - Tan Sri Abu Zahar Ujang (from 26 April)
- Speaker of the Dewan Rakyat: Tan Sri Datuk Seri Panglima Pandikar Amin Mulia
- Chief Justice: Tun Dato' Seri Zaki Azmi

=== State level ===
- Johor:
  - Sultan of Johor:
    - Sultan Iskandar (until 22 January)
    - Sultan Ibrahim (from 23 January)
  - Menteri Besar of Johor: Abdul Ghani Othman
- Kedah:
  - Sultan of Kedah: Sultan Abdul Halim Mu'adzam Shah
  - Menteri Besar of Kedah: Azizan Abdul Razak
- Kelantan:
  - Sultan of Kelantan:
    - Sultan Ismail Petra (until 13 September)
    - Sultan Muhammad V (from 13 September)
  - Menteri Besar of Kelantan: Nik Abdul Aziz Nik Mat
- Perlis:
  - Raja of Perlis: Tuanku Syed Sirajuddin
  - Menteri Besar of Perlis: Md Isa Sabu
- Perak:
  - Sultan of Perak: Sultan Azlan Muhibbuddin Shah
  - Menteri Besar of Perak: Zambry Abdul Kadir
- Pahang:
  - Sultan of Pahang: Sultan Haji Ahmad Shah Al-Musta'in Billah
  - Menteri Besar of Pahang: Adnan Yaakob
- Selangor:
  - Sultan of Selangor: Sultan Sharafuddin Idris Shah
  - Menteri Besar of Selangor: Abdul Khalid Ibrahim
- Terengganu:
  - Sultan of Terengganu: Tengku Muhammad Ismail (Regent)
  - Menteri Besar of Terengganu: Ahmad Said
- Negeri Sembilan:
  - Yang di-Pertuan Besar of Negeri Sembilan: Tuanku Muhriz
  - Menteri Besar of Negeri Sembilan: Mohamad Hasan
- Penang:
  - Governor of Penang: Tun Abdul Rahman Abbas
  - Chief Minister of Penang: Lim Guan Eng
- Malacca:
  - Governor of Malacca: Tun Mohd Khalid Yaakob
  - Chief Minister of Malacca: Mohd Ali Rustam
- Sarawak:
  - Governor of Sarawak: Tun Abang Muhammad Salahuddin
  - Chief Minister of Sarawak: Abdul Taib Mahmud
- Sabah:
  - Governor of Sabah: Tun Ahmadshah Abdullah
  - Chief Minister of Sabah: Musa Aman

== Events ==
=== January ===
- 1 January – The new Malacca state administrative centre, Hang Tuah Jaya was declared a municipality.
- 4 January – Datuk Abu Kassim Mohammad sworn in as Chief Commissioner of the Malaysian Anti-Corruption Commission (MACC).
- 8 January – Three churches in the Klang Valley were attacked following a legal dispute involving a Catholic news weekly The Herald which used the word "Allah" for the Christian God.
- 10 January – A church and a school guard post in Taiping, Perak had Molotov cocktails thrown at them. There was no damage to the All Saints Church in Jalan Taming Sari while the guard post at Convent High School suffered only minor damage.
- 17 January – A teacher and five students from Chung Ling High School were killed in a dragon boat accident tragedy in Penang, Malaysia.
- 18 January – MyID, electronic government transaction scheme was launched.
- 20 January – Police arrested eight men for attacking a Christian church with a firebomb in the Klang Valley.
- 21 January – Two surau, in Sabak Aur and Parit Beting in Muar, Johor were damaged by arson.
- 22 January – Sultan Iskandar of Johor, the 8th Yang di-Pertuan Agong (1984–1989), died aged 77.
- 23 January – Death of Sultan Iskandar of Johor
  - His body was laid to rest at Mahmoodiah Royal Mausoleum, Johor Bahru, Johor. His son the Tunku Mahkota Johor Tunku Ibrahim Ismail was proclaimed as the 5th Sultan of Johor with the title Sultan Ibrahim ibni Almarhum Sultan Iskandar. Johor declared seven days of mourning with the flag of Malaysia and the state flag of Johor be flown at half-mast and all entertainment activities cancelled.
- 24 January – A light aircraft crashed into the jungle at Kampung Sungai Ladong, Simunjan, in Samarahan Division, Sarawak, killing the pilot and injuring a surgeon who was also on board.
- 28 January – The Government Transformation Programme (GTP) was unveiled.
- 29 January – Shah Alam Member of Parliament, Khalid Abdul Samad was suspended for six months as Shah Alam PAS chief and member of the party's political bureau by the PAS discipline committee.

=== February ===
Regular international biometric passport (ICAO-compliant), issued starting February 2010

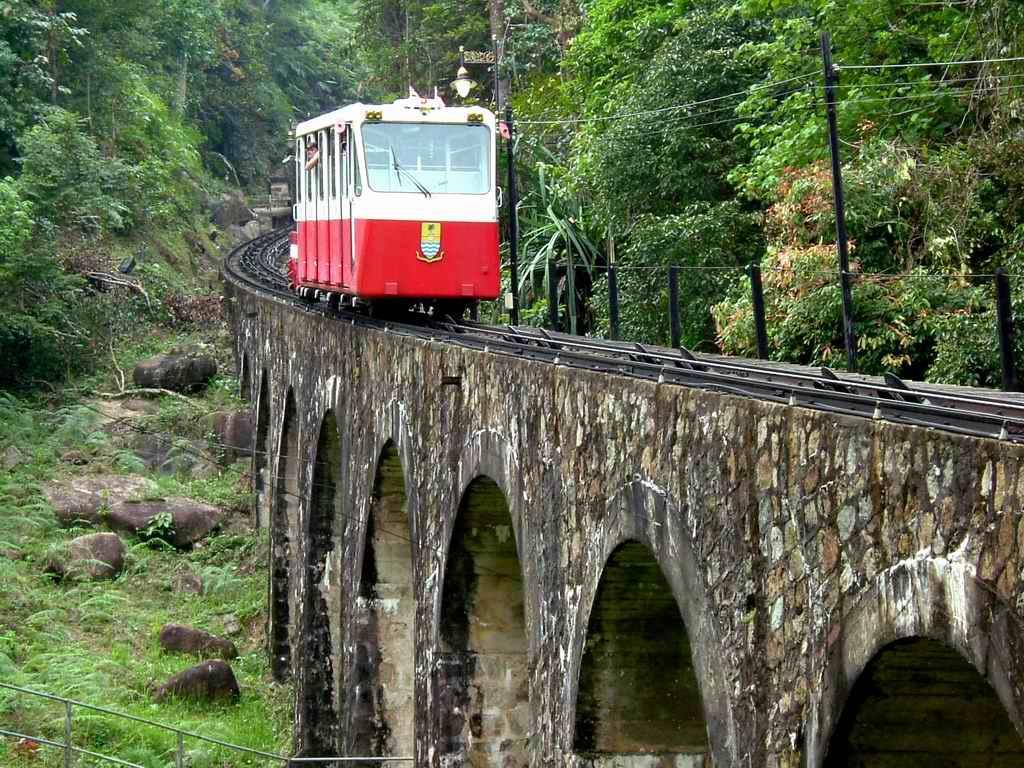
Penang Hill Railway.

- 2 February
  - The ICAO version of the Malaysian passport was launched.
- 2 February
  - The sodomy trial of Anwar Ibrahim began for the second time (the first was in 1998).
- 9 February – The Federal Court declared Zambry Abdul Kadir the rightful Menteri Besar of Perak.
- 12 February – Bayan Baru MP Zahrain Mohamed Hashim quit the People's Justice Party (PKR) party.
- 20 February – Penang Hill's iconic funicular train made its final run after 87 years. It would be replaced by a RM63 mil upgraded system seven months later.
- 23 February
  - Much of the 200-year-old Ho Ann Kiong Temple Chinese temple in the Chinatown Kuala Terengganu, Terengganu was destroyed by fire.
  - A Malaysian consular employee was stabbed to death outside his home in a suspected road-rage incident in Sydney, Australia.
- 27 February – A 3-year-old girl Syafia Humairah Sahari was killed in an act of abuse.

=== March ===
- 1–7 March – 2010 Tour de Langkawi
- 2 March – Nibong Tebal MP Tan Tee Beng quit the People's Justice Party (PKR) party.
- 8 March
  - The Federal Court of Malaysia ruled Anwar Ibrahim's 1998 dismissal as Deputy Prime Minister and finance minister was lawful.
  - The Norwegian Crown Prince Haakon VIII and Crown Princess Mette-Merit visited Malaysia.
- 9 March – Three siblings perished in a fire that gutted their house and four other houses in Bukit Mertajam, Penang.
- 10 March – A teacher and three children were injured in an attack at a Kindergarten in Muar, Johor.
- 14 March – Malaysia's World no.1 badminton player, Lee Chong Wei won the All England men's title.
- 24 March – Telekom Malaysia launches UniFi, a fibre optic service.
- 25 March – A Royal Malaysian Air Force (RMAF) pilot was killed when his Pilatus PC-7 MK2 aircraft crashed in Universiti Utara Malaysia (UUM) in Sintok, Kedah.
- 28 March – Former MCA deputy president Chua Soi Lek was elected as the new president, beating Ong Tee Keat and Ong Ka Ting.
- 30 March – Malaysia's New Economic Model (NEM) was unveiled.

=== April ===
- 15 April – Bakar Arang, Kedah's state assemblyman Tan Wei Shu quit the People's Justice Party (PKR) party.
- 17 April – Achik Spin (real name Abdillah Murad Md Shari), vocalist of Malaysian rock band Spin died in a car accident on Kajang–Seremban Highway near Pajam, Negeri Sembilan.
- 19 April – People's Justice Party (PKR) party treasurer for Hulu Selangor, Dr Halili Rahmat quit the party and joined UMNO.
- 20 April
  - Two Perak PKR female leaders, Roshanita Mohd Basir and Soraya Sulaiman, quit the party to join UMNO.
  - The Sarawak National Party (SNAP) officially joined the Pakatan Rakyat.
- 22 April – Kelantan PKR youth chief Wan Khairul Ihsan Wan Ahmad and secretary Ezri Zainal Abidin quit the party to join UMNO.
- 25 April – 2010 Hulu Selangor by-election, Barisan Nasional (BN) candidates P. Kamalanathan won a by-election with a majority of 1,725 votes beating People's Justice Party (PKR) candidates Zaid Ibrahim.
- 26 April – A 15-year-old boy Aminulrasyid Amzah was shot dead while reversing his car in an attempt to run over several policemen in Shah Alam, Selangor.

=== May ===
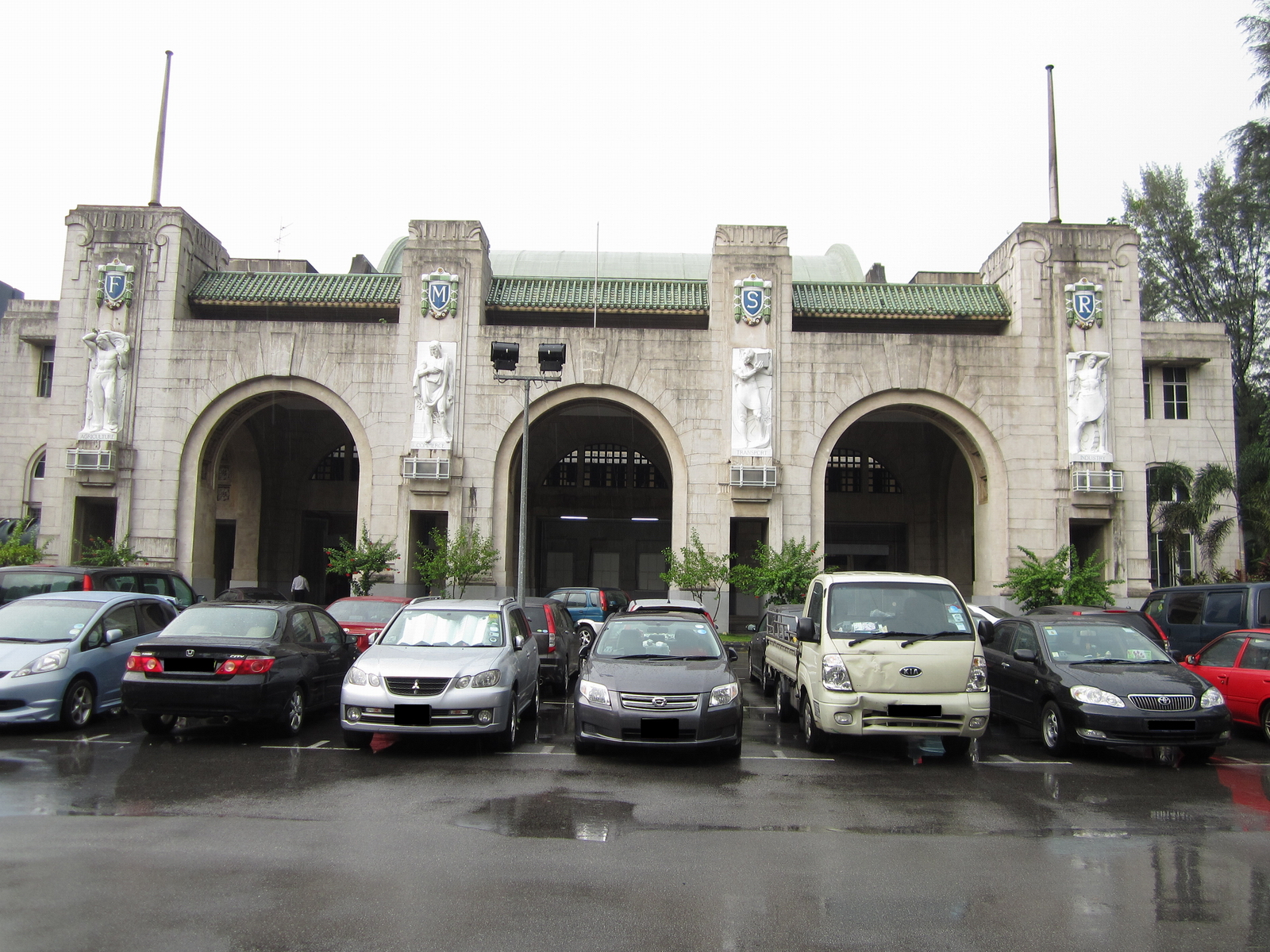
Tanjong Pagar railway station in Singapore owned by Malaysian KTMB.

- 9–16 May – 2010 Thomas & Uber Cup, Kuala Lumpur, Malaysia.
- 16 May – 2010 Sibu by-election, Democratic Action Party (DAP) candidates Wong Ho Leng won a by-election with a majority of 398 votes, beating Barisan Nasional (BN) candidates Robert Lau Hui Yew.
- 19 May – Kelantan palace guard Ramli Mohamad, who was shot by an unidentified assailant on 1 May, died in hospital.
- 25 May – A Malaysian tanker and a bulk carrier collided in the Singapore Strait, resulting in an oil spill estimated at 2,000 tonnes.

=== June ===
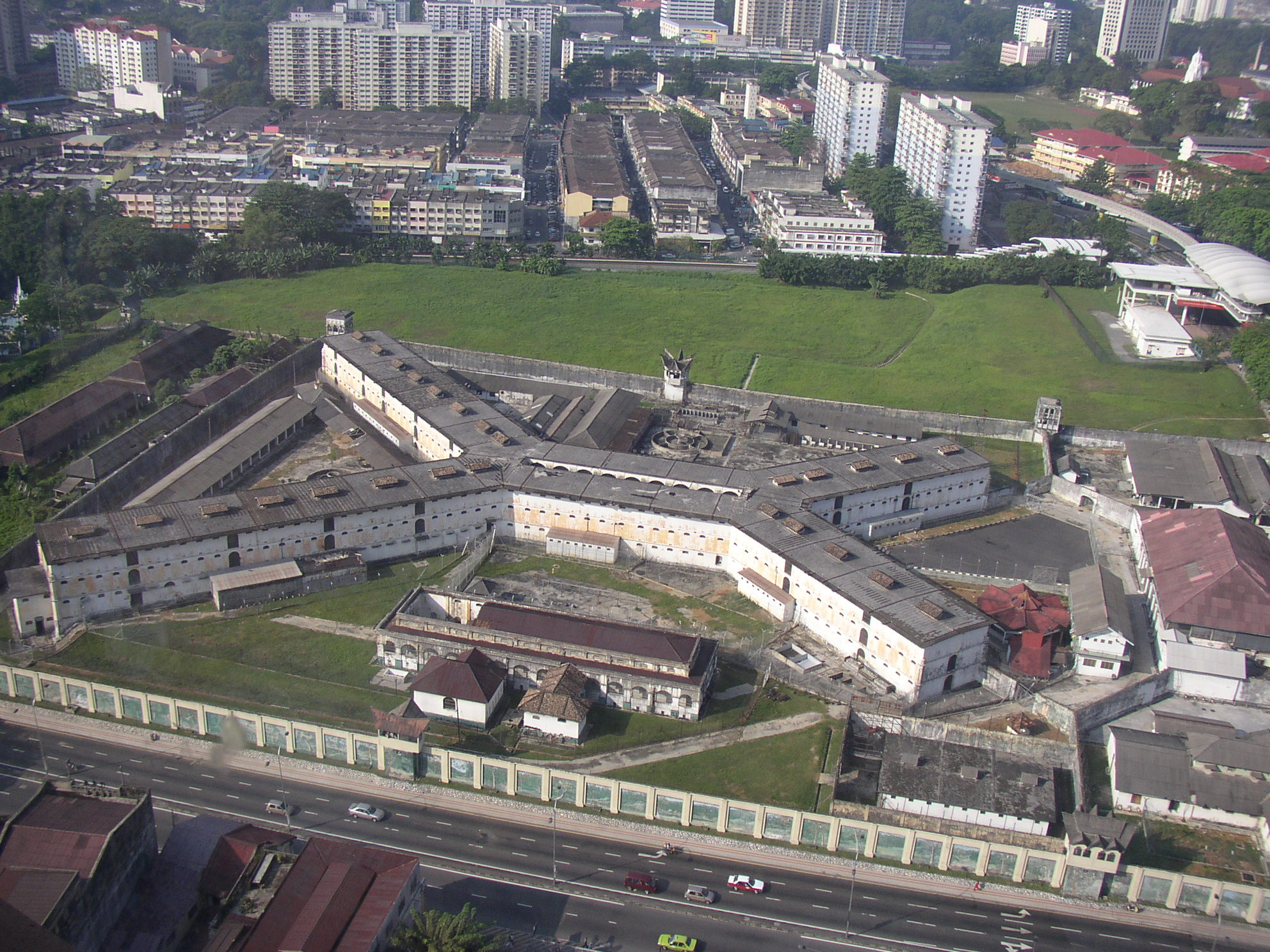
An overhead view of the Pudu Prison complex, as seen from the Berjaya Times Square. (2008)

- 2 June – All 12 Malaysians on board the Turkish vessel MV Mavi Marvara found safety following the flotilla attack by the Israeli naval forces, which was carrying activists to the Gaza Strip on 1 June, killing at least ten people.
- 3 June – The Land Public Transport Commission (SPAD) was gazetted.
- 6 June – All six Malaysians on board the Cambodian vessel MV Rachel Corrie returned home.
- 11 June – Official opening of the Tuanku Mizan Zainal Abidin Mosque (Iron Mosque) in Putrajaya, Malaysia.
- 12–19 June — 2010 Sukma Games in Malacca.
- 15 June – Malim Nawar, Perak's state assemblyman Keshvinder Singh quit the Democratic Action Party (DAP).
- 20 June – The 115-year-old Pudu Prison's wall between Jalan Pudu and Jalan Hang Tuah, Kuala Lumpur was demolished to make way for a road-widening project, which included the construction of an underpass at Jalan Pudu–Hang Tuah junctions.
- 22 June – An Indonesian boat sank in the Strait of Malacca near Port Dickson, Negeri Sembilan leaving two dead and seven others missing.
- 25 June – A Sikorsky-type helicopter belonging to a logging company crashed near Long Pelutan, Baram, Sarawak, killing its American pilot.

=== July ===
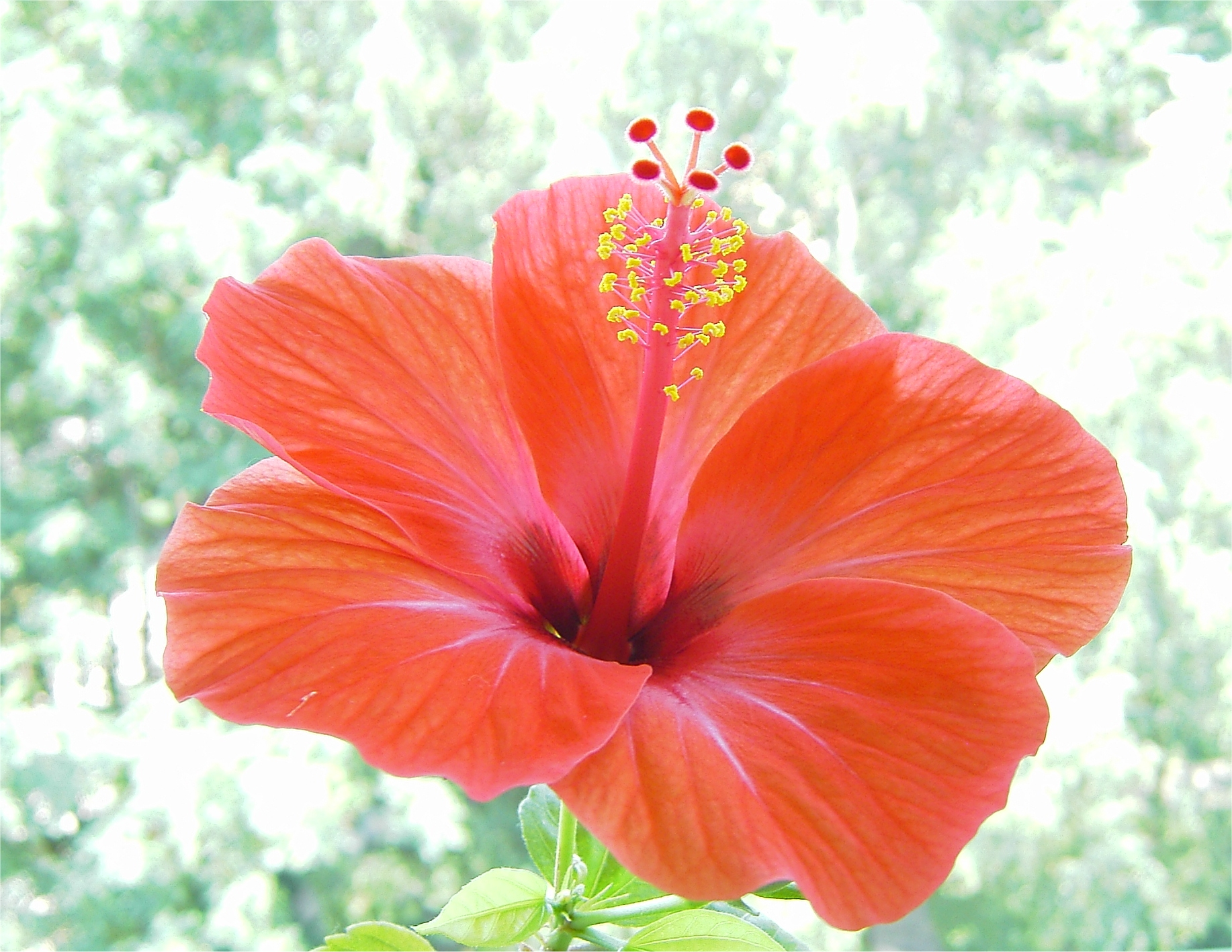
Bunga Raya (Hibiscus rosa sinesis) turns 50.

- 2 July – The second submarine KD Tun Abdul Razak arrived at Lumut Naval Base, Perak.
- 6 July–22 August – A population census was carried out, results showing the nation's population to be 28,334,135.
- 9 July – Proton cars celebrated its 25th anniversary. Launch of the Proton EMAS prototype cars.
- 16 July – The federal government announced a reduction in subsidies for fuel and sugar.
- 26 July – Heavy vehicles were banned during peak hours in the morning to ease congestion on certain routes of the PLUS Expressways in the Klang Valley, beginning 2 August.
- 28 July – 50th anniversary of the Bunga Raya (Chinese Hibiscus).
- 31 July – The Hari Pahlawan (Warriors Day) celebrations were held at the Merdeka Square, Kuala Lumpur, Malaysia for the first time.

=== August ===
- 3 August – Former Permatang, Selangor state assemblyman Datuk Abdul Aziz Mohd Noh and his female personal assistant Siti Rohana Ismat, were found shot dead inside a car at the North–South Expressway Northern Route near Sungai Buloh, Selangor.
- 12 August
  - The Ipoh–Kuala Lumpur–Seremban electric train service (ETS) express route began operations.
  - Kelantan introduced the Islamic gold dinar and silver dirham known as Kelantanese dinar as an alternative currency.
- 13 August – Two people were killed and two others injured in a freak storm at a Ramadan bazaar in Jasin, Malacca.
- 14 August – A man ran amok and killed his wife at their home in Langkap near Teluk Intan, Perak.
- 14–26 August – Malaysia at the 2010 Summer Youth Olympics in Singapore.
- 16 August – Pasir Mas Deputy RELA Chief Harun Abdullah, who was reported missing on Friday 13 August, was found dead near a railway track in Tumpat, Kelantan.
- 17 August – Four in a family of six were killed when their car collided with a van at Km 22 of Jalan Seremban–Simpang Pertang road in Bukit Tangga near Kuala Klawang in Jelebu, Negeri Sembilan.
- 18 August – Thai pathologist Dr. Pornthip Rojanasunand maintained that political aide Teoh Beng Hock did not commit suicide.
- 22 August – A 6-year-old boy was killed and two men were injured in an explosion at an abandoned house used to store fireworks and firecrackers at Kampung Seberang Baroh in Cabang Tiga near Kuala Terengganu, Terengganu.
- 23 August – Vandals splashed red paint on a surau in Taman Pulai Impian, Sikamat, Negeri Sembilan and left a broken beer bottle there.
- 30 August – The ground-breaking ceremony for the new Low Cost Carrier Terminal (LCCT) known as KLIA 2 at the Kuala Lumpur International Airport (KLIA) in Sepang, Selangor.

=== September ===
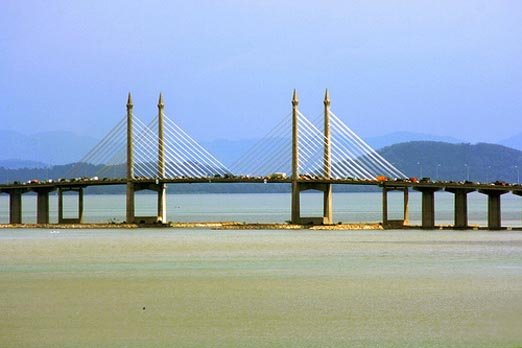
Penang Bridge turns 25.

- 1 September – Ismail Omar will replace Tan Sri Musa Hassan as the country's new Inspector-General of Police on 13 September.
- 2 September – The Kuala Lumpur–Karak Expressway and the East Coast Expressway Phase 1 (ECE 1) would be toll-free from 9pm till 6am on 7, 8, 15 and 16 September during Hari Raya Aidilfitri holidays.
- 6 September – A cosmetics millionaire Datuk Sosilawati Lawiya and three others, her driver Kamaruddin Shamsudin, CIMB Kampong Baru bank officer Noorhisham Mohammad and personal lawyer Ahmad Kamil Abdul Karim were reported missing since 30 August.
- 11 September – A 132kV power cable caught fire on the Penang Bridge, causing a massive traffic jam on both sides of the bridge
- 12 September – A missing cosmetics millionaire Datuk Sosilawati Lawiya and three others, her driver Kamaruddin Shamsuddin, CIMB Kampong Baru bank officer Noorhisham Mohamad and personal lawyer Ahmad Kamil Abdul Karim were murdered, burnt and their ashes strewn in a river near Ladang Gadong, in Tanjung Sepat near Banting, Selangor.
- 13 September – The Regent of Kelantan, Tengku Muhammad Faris Petra Ibni Sultan Ismail Petra was proclaimed as the new Sultan of Kelantan with the title Sultan Muhammad V.
- 14 September – Penang Bridge celebrated its 25th anniversary.
- 16 September
  - The first time of public holiday Malaysia Day.
  - Three Fire and Rescue Department of Malaysia personnel were injured after a helicopter they were in crash landed in a rubber estate at Bukit Lada, FELCRA Kuala Kaung, in Lanchang, Pahang.
- 19 September – Datuk Sosilawati Lawiya's friend and Kosmetik Aveer founder, Sarina Jaafar, was found hanging in the master bedroom of her house at Taman Pauh Jaya in Bukit Mertajam, Penang.
- 20 September
  - Malaysia and Singapore agreed to swap land parcels in the city-state Singapore as part of the Malaysia–Singapore Points of Agreement of 1990.
  - Istana Budaya held Mahathir, the Musical.

=== October ===
- 3–14 October – Malaysia at the 2010 Commonwealth Games in New Delhi, India.
- 6 October – A monkey killed a four-day-old baby girl sleeping in the living room of her family's home in Seremban, Negeri Sembilan.
- 7 October – Six fishermen were missing and 11 were saved when a merchant ship rammed into their boat in the Strait of Malacca, about 10 nautical miles (19 km) off Sabak Bernam, Selangor.
- 9 October
  - From 2016 onwards, the Penilaian Menengah Rendah (PMR) examination for Form Three students would be replaced with a school-based assessment to be drawn up by the Malaysian Examination Institution (Lembaga Peperiksaan Malaysia).
  - Batu Sapi member of parliament Datuk Edmund Chong Ket Wah died in a motorcycle crash at Kota Kinabalu, Sabah.
- 10 October
  - Malaysia's first angkasawan (cosmonaut), Sheikh Muszaphar Shukor marries Dr. Halina Mohd Yunos.
  - Twelve people were killed and more than 50 others injured in a highway crash involving two buses, three cars and a van at Km 223 of the North–South Expressway, near the Simpang Ampat Interchange in Malacca.
- 15 October
  - Parliament of Malaysia celebrated its 50th anniversary of the formation.
  - The RM5 billion landmark Warisan Merdeka project, including a 100-storey tower in Kuala Lumpur, Malaysia was announced during the 2011 Budget.
- 16 October – Beginning next year, all Year One pupils will be studying Science and Mathematics in Bahasa Malaysia (Malay Language), ahead of the initial 2012 target. Their textbooks will also be in Bahasa Malaysia.
- 18 October – Six people are dead and up to seven people are feared missing after a ferry collided with a tugboat in the Anap river, Sarawak.
- 20 October – Malacca was declared as a developed state in Malaysia.
- 21 October – 2010 Southeast Asian haze
  - The cloud of thick smog produced from the forest fires in Indonesia drifted across Malaysia's west coast affecting the capital of Malaysia, Kuala Lumpur and other areas such as Malacca and Johor. Muar, a coastal town located in Johor, experienced a hazardous Air Pollution Index (API) of 432 while the air quality in Malacca deteriorated to an unhealthy API of 106.
  - As a preventive measure, schools in Muar were shut down to prevent any adverse respiratory illnesses to children. Respiratory masks were also distributed to the public.
  - Vessels traveling along the Malacca Straits were also advised to travel with caution due to the poor visibility which fell to 2 nautical miles.
- 25 October
  - Nine agreements worth at least RM 30 billion have been inked between the Government and the private sector, boosting the RM 1.3 trillion Economic Transformation Programme (ETP).
  - 2010 Southeast Asian haze
    - In response, government hospitals and clinics were placed on standby to cater to the high influx of haze-related respiratory illnesses.
- 29 October – Seven people were killed and more than 20 injured when the bus they were travelling in crashed at the Genting Sempah–Genting Highlands Highway slip roads of the Kuala Lumpur–Karak Expressway near Genting Sempah, Pahang.

=== November ===
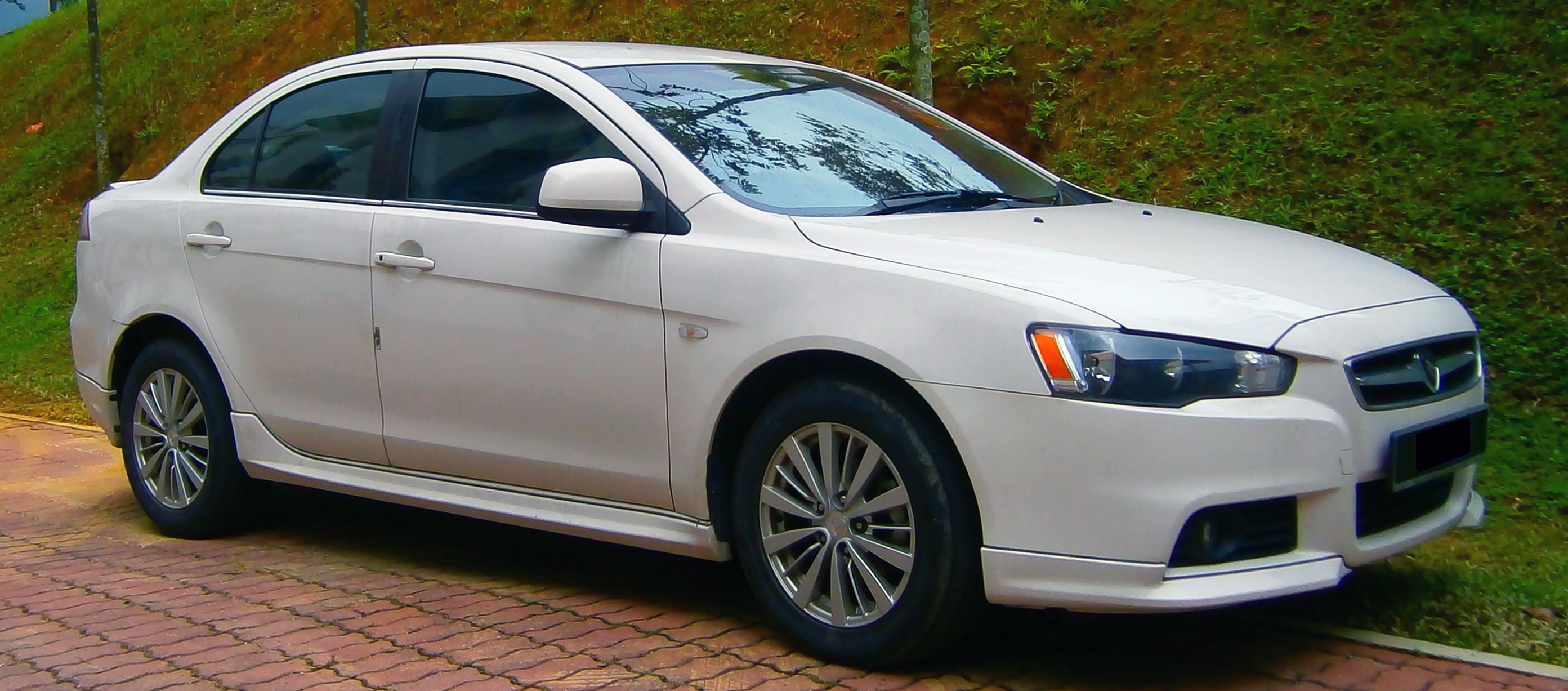
Proton Inspira

- 1 November
  - Australian Prime Minister, Julia Gillard visited Malaysia and met the Deputy Prime Minister Muhyiddin Yassin.
  - Several parts of northern Peninsular Malaysia were hit by flash floods. About 50,000 people were evacuated and at least four people died.
- 2 November – United States Secretary of State, Hillary Clinton made a three-day official visit to Malaysia.
- 4 November – Galas and Batu Sapi by-elections. Barisan Nasional (BN) win in both by-elections.
- 7 November – Sixteen people, one of them a four-year-old boy, survived an 18-hour ordeal floating at sea after their boat sank near Tenggol Islamd off Dungun, Terengganu.
- 8 November – Eight workers were injured in the motorcycle rim factory blast at Perai, Penang.
- 10 November – Launching of the new Proton New Sedan Proton Inspira (P3-90A), based on the Mitsubishi Lancer Evo.
- 12–27 November — Malaysia at the 2010 Asian Games in Guangzhou, China.
- 21 November — 2010 Penang Bridge International Marathon.
- 21–26 November — 2010 Malaysian Paralympiad in Malacca.
- 29 November – Somali pirates hijacked a Malaysian-flagged ship in the Indian Ocean with 23 crew members on board.

=== December ===
- 1 December – A heavy downpour caused floods in several areas of the Klang Valley. Several users reported a heavy traffic build-up at the Subang Interchange of the New Klang Valley Expressway (NKVE) on evening.
- 5 December
  - The Barisan Nasional (BN) charter was unveiled at the BN convention.
  - Police fired tear gas and water cannons at some 5,000 opposition-led protesters trying to hand over a memorandum on Selangor water issues to the Yang di-Pertuan Agong in Kuala Lumpur.
- 6 December – Former Menteri Besar of Selangor Dr. Mohamad Khir Toyo was charged with land fraud involving two plots of land and a house in Shah Alam, Selangor worth millions of ringgit.
- 8–16 December — Malaysia at the 2010 Asian Beach Games in Muscat, Oman.
- 9 December – South Korean President Lee Myung-bak made a two-day state visit to Malaysia in conjunction with the 50th anniversary of diplomatic relations between both countries.
- 12–19 December — Malaysia at the 2010 Asian Para Games in Guangzhou, China.
- 16 December – Opposition Leader, Dato' Seri Anwar Ibrahim was suspended for six months from Dewan Rakyat over his statement linking the 1 Malaysia concept with the One Israel campaign.
- 18 December
  - A 14-year-old girl, Siti Mazni Abdul Rahman was found murdered at the oil palm plantation in Parit Ju Darat, Tongkang Pechah, Johor.
  - The Sungai Buloh–Kajang MRT Line, part of the Klang Valley Mass Rail Transit (MRT) project was unveiled. Construction would begin in July 2011.
- 20 December – 2010 Cameron Highlands bus crash
  - Twenty–seven people, mostly Thai people tourist were killed when the double-decker coach bus they were travelling in crashed at the Second East–West Highway of the state of Perak–Pahang border near Cameron Highlands, Pahang.
- 23 December – The Selangor state government banned advertisements on billboards that feature the '1 Malaysia' logo.
- 24 December – Former Prime Minister Mahathir Mohamad and his wife Siti Hasmah Mohamad Ali visited India, and arrived in Mumbai.
- 29 December – Malaysia national football team won the 2010 AFF Suzuki Cup for the first time in 14 years after beating Indonesia 4–2 on aggregate in the finals. Malaysian Prime Minister, Mohammad Najib Abdul Razak declared a national public holiday on 31 December.

== National Day ==
=== Theme ===
1 Malaysia: Menjana Transformasi (1 Malaysia: Transforming the Nation)

=== National Day parade ===
Putra Indoor Stadium, Bukit Jalil, Kuala Lumpur

== Births ==
- 26 January – Duerra Mitilda – Actress, singer.
- 31 January – Ariq Darius Fharied – Footballer.
- 7 March – Syed Irfan – Actor.
- 9 March – Thierry Syedi – Footballer.
- 27 May – Putera Luqman Hafiz – Footballer.

== Deaths ==
- 1 January – Tan Sri Mohamed Rahmat – former Minister of Information and UMNO secretary general (born 1938)
- 9 January – Tun Dr Fatimah Hashim – first woman minister and Welfare Minister
- 22 January – Sultan Iskandar of Johor – 4th Sultan of Johor and 8th Yang di-Pertuan Agong (1984–1989).
- 23 January – Robert Lam – ex-newscaster
- 24 January – Tun Ghazali Shafie – former Home Minister.
- 27 February – Syafia Humairah Sahari – A 3-year-old girl.
- 23 March – Tan Sri Dr Sulaiman Daud – former Minister of Agriculture.
- 25 March – Datuk Dr. Zainal Abidin Ahmad – Hulu Selangor, PKR member of parliament.
- 2 April – Din Beramboi (real name: Mior Ahmad Fuad Mior Badri) – actor, comedian and Era FM DJ.
- 9 April – Datuk Robert Lau – Deputy Transport Minister and Bandar Sibu, BN member of parliament.
- 26 April – Aminulrasyid Amzah – student.
- 13 May – Ashaari Mohammad – Al-Arqam leader and founder.
- 1 July – Tun Omar Ong Yoke Lin – Independence fighter and former President of the Dewan Negara.
- 28 August – Isa Bakar – Malaysian footballer.
- 9 October – Datuk Edmund Chong Ket Wah – Batu Sapi, BN member of parliament.
- 8 November – Daud Ibrahim – former national cyclist.
- 24 November –Tun Dr. Lim Chong Eu – 2nd Chief Minister of Penang.
- 8 December – Fan Yew Teng – former DAP member of parliament, politician, social activist and writer.
- 16 December – Datuk Sulaiman Taha – Tenang Stesen, Johor's State Assemblyman.
- 18 December – Siti Mazni Abdul Rahman – A 14-year-old girl.
- 23 December – Tun Ibrahim Ismail (general) – Malaysian Armed Forces Chief of Staff (1970–1977).

== See also ==
- 2010
- 2009 in Malaysia | 2011 in Malaysia
- History of Malaysia
- List of Malaysian films of 2010
