= 2010 attacks against places of worship in Malaysia =

Religiously motivated crimes in Malaysia

Attacks against places of worship in Malaysia were carried out in January 2010 in response to Malaysia v. The Herald, a controversial court decision holding government regulations prohibiting non-Muslim publications from using the word 'Allah' to be unconstitutional. The government and many religious leaders condemned the attacks and called for calm and unity among Malaysians.

== Attacks ==
A total of 10 churches and few mosques have been attacked or vandalized since 31 December 2009 decision in Malaysia vs. The Herald. Only one church has been seriously damaged and no deaths or major injuries have been reported.

Three churches in Kuala Lumpur were subject to an arson attack. One suffered considerable damage; witnesses saw two individuals throwing "something looking like a petrol bomb". As a result, the police stepped up security at all churches.

On 8 January 2010, preparations for another attack were found at the Good Shepherd Lutheran Church in Jalan Othman which is located about 1.5 km from the Assumption Church in Jalan Templer. In the early morning of Sunday, 10 January 2010, the All Saints' Church at Taiping and a Catholic Convent school were shocked with the discovery of Molotov cocktails near church grounds. Black paint was thrown at the Malacca Baptist Church in Durian Daun.

Sunday worship at targeted churches went on smoothly just a few days after the attacks. The Metro Tabernacle Church, which was badly damaged in the attack on 8 January, held services at the Wisma MCA’s Dewan San Choon and churchgoers were said to be, "somber but joyful." Roughly 1,700 members of the Protestant church packed the hall for joint Mandarin and English services.

Apart from Christian churches, a Muslim surau in Klang, Selangor and a Sikh gurdwara in Sentul, Kuala Lumpur were also attacked on 10 January 2010 and 12 January 2010 respectively. In a later incident, a rum bottle was thrown into the compound of a mosque in Sarawak on 16 January 2010.

While authorities have denied any links to these attacks with the spate of church attacks, Sikhs also use the term Allah to describe God in the Punjabi language and the Malaysian Gurdwaras Council unsuccessfully sought to be a party to the Malaysia v. The Herald.

== List of attacks on places of worship in Malaysia ==
Institution	Religion / Denomination	Location	Date
Metro Tabernacle Assembly of God	Christian (Assemblies of God)	Desa Melawati, Kuala Lumpur	8 January 2010
Church of the Assumption	Christian (Roman Catholic)	Petaling Jaya, Selangor	8 January 2010
The Life Chapel	Christian (Christian Brethren)	Petaling Jaya, Selangor	8 January 2010
LCMS Good Shepherd Congregation	Christian (Lutheran)	Petaling Jaya, Selangor	9 January 2010
Surau Taman Menara Maju	Islam	Klang, Selangor	10 January 2010
All Saints' Church	Christian (Anglican)	Taiping, Perak	10 January 2010
Malacca Baptist Church	Christian (Baptist)	Malacca Town, Malacca	10 January 2010
The Church of Good Shepherd	Christian (Anglican)	Miri, Sarawak	10 January 2010
SIB Seremban	Christian (Sidang Injil Borneo)	Seremban, Negeri Sembilan	11 January 2010
Gurdwara Sahib Sentul	Sikh	Sentul, Kuala Lumpur	12 January 2010
Church of St. Elizabeth	Christian (Roman Catholic)	Kota Tinggi, Johor	14 January 2010
Grace Global Prayer Church	Christian (Independent)	Seremban, Negeri Sembilan	15 January 2010
Unnamed mosque	Islam	Sarawak	16 January 2010

== Political response ==
All major political parties in Malaysia consisting of the ruling Barisan Nasional coalition and the opposition Pakatan Rakyat parties, including the Pan-Malaysian Islamic Party (PAS), who labelled the attacks as contradicting the teachings of Islam had united in condemnation of these attacks.

=== Government reaction ===
Najib Razak, the prime minister of Malaysia at the time, condemned the church bombings, directed police to increase security at all places of worship, and called for unity amongst the Malaysian people. The government will hold inter-faith dialogues including prominent religious leaders to find "common denominators of understanding." Tan Sri Dr Koh Tsu Koon, Minister in the Prime Minister's Department, said the government has already met separately with religious groups.

Najib visited the church most badly damaged in the attacks, the Protestant Metro Tabernacle church in Kuala Lumpur and promised a grant of RM500,000 to assist with reconstruction. CIMB Foundation donated an additional RM100,000 to the church.

The Malaysia Home Affairs Ministry met with over 60 foreign diplomats for a briefing to discuss the attacks and security issues on 11 January 2010. Secretary-General of the Malaysian Home Affairs Ministry, Mahmood Adam, emphasized that Malaysia is still a safe country and that daily life has not been significantly disrupted."They wanted to know what the guarantees are that their safety and safety of others are ensured. Those are some of the issues raised but most importantly, they wanted to understand the situation here and we explained that Malaysia is totally different," the home minister said.

=== Opposition reaction ===
Opposition leader, Anwar Ibrahim of the Pakatan Rakyat coalition, stated that the UMNO-controlled newspaper Utusan Malaysia's "racist propaganda" over the Allah issue and "inflammatory rhetoric" both contributed to the spate of arson attacks. and that the publication must be held responsible.

PKR vice-president Azmin Ali has claimed that at least four UMNO members were involved in the arson attack on the Metro Tabernacle church.

=== Local community and international reaction ===
The 2010 church attacks generated strong condemnation from Muslims and non-Muslims alike. Roughly 130 Muslim non-profit organisations and volunteer police officers have stepped forward to provide security for churches.

== Police investigation ==
Police say that eight suspects have been arrested in connection to the arson committed at the Metro Tabernacle Church in Desa Melawati. The first suspect was arrested when seeking treatment for burns on his chest and arms at a hospital in Kuala Lumpur. Information obtained during this arrest led to the capture of seven other suspects.

The police and government officials have asked the public not to fan religious and ethnic tension by spreading rumours via the internet and text messages. Ismail said, "Please don't play the fool by posting fake information on the Internet through Facebook, blogs or via SMS. Please come to us if you have any information." Police are investigating posts on Facebook claiming to have witnessed the making of explosives used in the attacks. Police have warned that the claims may be a hoax. Deputy Inspector-General of Police Tan Sri Ismail Omar says that the police are also investigating reports of seditious and racially inflammatory activity on blogs. The student responsible for at least some of the posts has been arrested and released on bail.

== Prosecutions ==
Azuwan Shah, a Malaysia Muslim, was prosecuted for his alleged role in starting a fire at a Protestant church on 8 January 2010 but acquitted due to lack of evidence in July of the same year. Two witnesses said Azuwan was not at the church when the fire started.

Two brothers, Raja Mohamad Faizal Raja Ibrahim, aged 24, and Raja Mohamad Idzham Raja Ibrahim, aged 22, also Muslim, were charged and convicted in the same attack. The pair were convicted of "mischief by fire" on 13 August 2010. Komathy Suppiah, a district court judge in Kuala Lumpur, presided over the trial. She called the attack "appalling and despicable" and told the brothers that their conduct, "...strikes at the very foundations and tenets of a civilised society." As of 17 August 2010 the brothers have not yet been sentenced but face a maximum penalty of twenty years in prison.
