= Banting murders =

2010 mass murder of a millionaire and three others in Malaysia

- Sosilawati Lawiya
- Location: Banting, Selangor, Malaysia
- Date: 30 August 2010
- Attack type: Murder
- Weapon: Cricket bat
- Deaths: 4
- Injuries: 0
- Victims: Datuk Sosilawati Lawiya (47); Kamaruddin Shamsuddin (44); Noorhisham Mohamad (38); Ahmad Kamil Abdul Karim (32)
- Perpetrators: N. Pathmanabhan (51); T. Thilaiyalagan (20); R. Kathavarayan (31); R. Matan (21)
- Motive: Money and land matters
- Accused: N. Pathmanabhan (41); T. Thilaiyalagan (20); R. Kathavarayan (31); R. Matan (21)
- Charges: Murder (x4)
- Verdict: All four guilty of all four counts of murder Sentenced to death in 2013; Appeal dismissed by Court of Appeal in 2015; Federal Court dismissed appeal from three accused: Pathmanabhan, Thilaiyalagan and Kathavarayan; Matan acquitted by the Federal Court in 2017
- Convictions: Murder (x4)
- Convicted: N. Pathmanabhan (41); T. Thilaiyalagan (20); R. Kathavarayan (31)
- Judge: Justice Datuk Akhtar Tahir

On 30 August 2010, in Banting, Selangor, Malaysia, 47-year-old cosmetics millionaire Datuk Sosilawati Lawiya and her three companions – bank officer Noorhisham Mohamad, lawyer Ahmad Kamil Abdul Karim, and her driver Kamaruddin Shamsuddin – all went missing. The four missing people were later found to have been murdered and had their bodies burnt by a lawyer named N. Pathmanabhan and another three accomplices. The remains of Sosilawati and the three men were later found at a farm in Tanjung Sepat, which belonged to Pathmanabhan. Pathmanabhan and his three farm hands – T. Thilaiyalagan, R. Matan and R. Kathavarayan (also spelt R. Khatavarayan) – were all arrested and charged with murder based on circumstantial evidence and without the bodies of the victims in this case.

In May 2013, the four accused were all convicted of murder and sentenced to death by the Shah Alam High Court. A long-drawn appeal process ended in March 2017, with the Federal Court confirming the death sentences of Pathmanabhan, Thilaiyagan, and Kathavarayan but released Matan after citing insufficient evidence to link him to the murders. The condemned trio - Pathmanabhan, Thilaiyagan and Kathavarayan - are still incarcerated on death row as of 2024.

The conviction of the killers marked the second case of murder conviction(s) without a body in Malaysia after the 1963 case of Sunny Ang, a law student who was hanged for murdering his girlfriend during a scuba diving trip for her insurance at Sisters' Islands in Singapore, when Singapore was still a part of Malaysia back then.

== Murder investigation ==
From left: Kamaruddin Shamsuddin, Ahmad Kamil Abdul Karim and Noorhisham Mohamad

On 30 August 2010, in Selangor, Malaysia, 47-year-old cosmetics millionaire Datuk Sosilawati Lawiya and her three companions – 38-year-old bank officer Noorhisham Mohamad, 32-year-old lawyer Ahmad Kamil Abdul Karim, and her 44-year-old driver Kamaruddin Shamsuddin – went to Banting from Kuala Lumpur for business matters, and they went missing thereafter. At the time of her disappearance, Sosilawati, who was of Indonesian descent and grew up in Johor, was the founder of Nouvelle Beauty Center Sdn. Bhd since the 1990s, and after her first marriage (which ended with a divorce), she was married to Malaysian rock singer Nashrudin Elias (nicknamed "Nash") on 16 November 2006 before her divorce in 2009 and third marriage, and she also had six children.

When Sosilawati and the three men did not return home that day, a missing persons report was lodged, and the families of the missing four went to search for them. The police took over the case and a week later, the police found the cars of Sosilawati and Ahmad Kamil parked at an apartment and a five-star hotel respectively in Subang Jaya. The investigation officers managed to uncover through their investigations that Sosilawati and the men were supposed to meet two lawyers – 41-year-old N. Pathmanabhan (Pathmanabhan a/l Nalliannen) and his 38-year-old brother Surendren – over a land deal. The brothers were questioned ten days after the disappearance of the millionaire and her partners, and six farm workers, who were employed at Pathmanabhan's betel leaf-cum-vegetable farm in Tanjung Sepat, were also detained for questioning.

After thorough investigations, it was uncovered that Pathmanabhan was the mastermind of the murders and due to a land deal allegedly going sour, he had solicited the three farmhands to kill Sosilawati and the three men, while Surendren himself was not involved in the murders. Regardless, given their unrelated previous acts of professional misconduct as lawyers, both Pathmanabhan and Surendren were no longer allowed to practice law through a hearing in October 2010. A month after murdering Sosilawati and her associates, on 13 October 2010, Pathmanabhan and the three farmhands - 20-year-old T. Thilaiyalagan (Thilaiyallagan a/l Thanasagaran), 21-year-old R. Matan (Matan a/l Ravichandran) and 31-year-old R. Kathavarayan (Kathavarayan a/l Rajodorai) - were officially charged with four counts of murder. Pathmanabhan was also named a prime suspect behind the disappearances of several people who were formerly his clients, including an Indian businessman, and it was speculated that Pathmanabhan had killed these people as well, making it a total of 13 murder cases which Pathmanabhan was allegedly responsible for.

It was believed that the bodies of Sosilawati and the others were being burnt to ashes before they were thrown into a nearby river. A police search was conducted within the perimeters of the farm, and the police managed to recover multiple exhibits of evidence, including bone fragments, blood stains and torn pieces of an underwear, and also discovered an alleged makeshift burning site where the four murder suspects had allegedly burnt the bodies after killing Sosilawati and her men. In total, 2,030 specimens of burnt human bones and teeth were retrieved from the river inside the farm, and several of the four victims' personal belongings, including Sosilawati's wristwatch, were also recovered.

Two other workers - 19-year-old K. Sarawanan and 26-year-old U. Suresh were also charged, not for murder but for seven counts of aiding the four alleged killers to dispose of the evidence under Section 201 of the Penal Code. In October 2010, the pair was sentenced to seven years in prison after they pleaded guilty. Four months later in February 2011, the duo's jail terms were enhanced to 20 years of jail each by the Shah Alam High Court.

== Murder trial and sentencing ==
=== Prosecution's case ===
N. Pathmanabhan, the lawyer who masterminded the murders.

On 4 July 2011, the four conspirators of the Banting murders – N. Pathmanabhan, T. Thilaiyalagan, R. Kathavarayan and R. Matan – officially stood trial for the murders of the four victims – Sosilawati Lawiya, Noorhisham Mohamad, Ahmad Kamil Abdul Karim and Kamaruddin Shamsuddin – at the Shah Alam High Court.

The trial court was told that Pathmanabhan and Sosilawati had dealings with each other with regards to land transactions in Penang, and on the day of the murders, Sosilawati and the three men arrived at the farm to meet with Pathmanabhan over a pending land deal. It was found that this was a ruse by Pathmanabhan, who was unable to help Sosilawati to honor a cheque pertaining to the land matters in Penang, and hence he lured Sosilawati and her partners to the farm, where he and his co-defendants held them hostage upon their arrival. It was the prosecution's case that due to his failure to settle the cheques, Pathmanabhan directed the three farmhands to murder Sosilawati and the three men. Under Pathmanabhan's order, the trio – Thilaiyalagan, Kathavarayan and Matan – had battered the victims to death with a cricket bat and other weapons, and they placed the bodies on a makeshift pyre and burned it down to ashes. The conspirators disposed of the ashes at the nearby river within the perimeters of the farm. The four victims' presence at the farm was corroborated by the testimony of Indonesian maid Siti Hamidah Karnax, who had seen a woman and three men entering the farm and a huge fire coming from the farm, and also heard a woman screaming at least twice from the farm.

The blood of the three male victims was found on the wall, and a cricket bat and two pieces of zinc recovered from the farm also contained the DNA stains belonging to the victims. The two other accomplices, U Suresh and K Sarawanan, who were serving their sentences at Sungai Udang Prison, Melaka for helping to dispose of the evidence, came to court as prosecution witnesses. 39-year-old Suzana Radin Pangat, the wife of Noorhisham Mohamad (who was one of the four murdered), stated that she received a phonecall from her husband, who told her he would be absent from home for three days and would help Sosilawati with the land dealings; but, as it turned out, Noorhisham was in fact threatened by the killers to make this call to his wife to distract her and the families of the other victims, before he was murdered. Suzana was initially angry that her husband would leave her and their children to help settle Sosilawati's matters before she realized the sad truth of her husband's brutal death. The original farm owner's nephew K. Sree Ganashan also testified that his aunt had sold the farm to Pathmanabhan a year before the murders. 62-year-old Buhari Mohamed, who was Sosilawati's ex-husband from her first marriage, also testified that when he noticed that his ex-wife was missing, he contacted Pathmanabhan and asked why Sosilawati had not yet returned home after going to Banting, wanting the ex-lawyer to take responsibility. Pathmanabhan reportedly replied that he did not know and seemed surprised why would a good person like Sosilawati disappear.

=== Defence's case ===
Alleged accomplices of the Banting murders
R. Kathavarayan, one of the three farm hands charged with murder

T. Thilaiyalagan, one of the three farm hands charged with murder

At the close of the prosecution's case, the trial court ruled that the four accused had a case to answer and ordered the four to enter their defence in April 2012. Pathmanabhan was the first to take the stand. Pathmanabhan denied planning to kill Sosilawati and three others, and also denied that the land sale and purchase deal in Penang involving the cosmetics millionaire was a fraud. During the trial, Pathmanabhan also testified about his involvement in two conflicting land deals and was entangled between Sosilawati, a prominent entrepreneur, and Datuk Abdul Rahman Palil, described by Pathmanabhan as a powerful politician, and as this was an ethical breach and it compromised his impartiality, Pathmanabhan admitted to his reluctance to arrange a meeting involving both parties. The judge would later consider this in his verdict as a starting point for Pathmanabhan to commit the murder of Sosilawati and her associates after choosing between the two.

The three farm workers also elected to put up their defence. Thilaiyalagan's defence lawyer Gurbachan Singh argued that his client never met Sosilawati and the three men, and Thilaiyalagan insisted that he was never involved in the murders. Matan similarly protested his innocence, stating that he had no reason to murder Sosilawati and had never met any of the victims on the day in question. Matan stated that he never received any order from whoever to commit a crime, much less murder. Kathavarayan, who also denied killing the four, stated that he only acted to apprehend the driver at the time of the incident and pinned the blame on the others, and he denied during cross-examination that he was harbouring vengeance against Pathmanabhan over him driving his family out of their house. Kathavarayan also testified that he heard Pathmanabhan told him not to tell anyone about the murders and he would hang himself if any trouble arose. In response, the prosecution argued that the defence of the four men should not be accepted, stating that their evidence was unsafe and unreliable, and they should be convicted as charged.

=== Verdict ===
On 23 May 2013, Justice Datuk Akhtar Tahir of the Shah Alam High Court delivered his verdict. In his judgement, Justice Akhtar found that the primary motive behind Sosilawati's murder was related to land issues. Justice Akhtar found that Pathmanabhan had a motive to kill Sosilawati due to his inability to honor a cheque issued to her and also directed the other three defendants to murder the four. The judge also noted that in the matter of Pathmanabhan being caught between Sosilawati and the politician, when pushed to the edge, Pathmanabhan resorted to the drastic step of eliminating Sosilawati after choosing between the two, which inadvertently led to the deaths of Noorhisham, Kamaruddin and Ahmad Kamil, who were merely at the "wrong place at the wrong time".

Akhtar also took note of Sosilawati's intended visit to Pathmanabhan in order to expedite payment on cheques issued by his firm, and the circumstantial evidence also corroborated that the four victims were attacked and murdered by the four accused at the farm when the land deal fell through and in spite of the absence of the victims' bodies, there was sufficient evidence to prove the four guilty of murder. As such, the four accused – Pathmanabhan, Thilaiyagan, Matan and Kathavarayan – were found guilty of murder on all four counts, and they were sentenced to death by hanging.

28-year-old Erni Dekritawati Yuliana Buhari (alias Rita Sosilawati), the eldest of Sosilawati's six children, said she was satisfied with the verdict of death handed down by the court, and expressed gratitude to the support their family received from the public throughout the ordeal. Five years later, in July 2015, Sosilawati's children managed to get a death certificate for their mother after filing a lawsuit.

== Court of Appeal hearing ==
The four condemned, who all confirmed they would appeal after the end of their trial, submitted their appeals, which were all fixed for hearing on 9 February 2015, but it was postponed to 18 May.

On 18 May 2015, the Court of Appeal heard the appeals of the four killers, who all continued to deny that they were involved in the murders of Sosilawati and her men, albeit for different reasons. The prosecution argued in response that Pathmanabhan had the motive to murder Sosilawati because he had insufficient funds to honour the cheques worth RM3 million and RM1 million due to Sosilawati over the sale of a plot of land in Penang, and also cited the three farm workers' respective roles behind the Banting killings, and urged the court to accept the guilt of the accused as presented by the circumstantial evidence. The judgement was subsequently reserved till a later date.

On 4 December 2015, a three-judge panel chaired by Justice Datuk Tengku Maimun Tuan Mat delivered their ruling, determining that all the four appellants were indeed guilty of the murders of Sosilawati and her three associates. She highlighted in the judgement that the panel found no merit in the appeal and they did not accept the appellants' attempt to discredit the testimony of Siti Hamidah, whom the trial court accepted as a truthful witness, and the circumstantial evidence had definitively pointed to the guilt of all the four appellants despite the lack of positive findings of the bodies.

The final avenue of appeal the four condemned had left was to bring the case forward to the Federal Court of Malaysia.

== Federal Court appeal ==
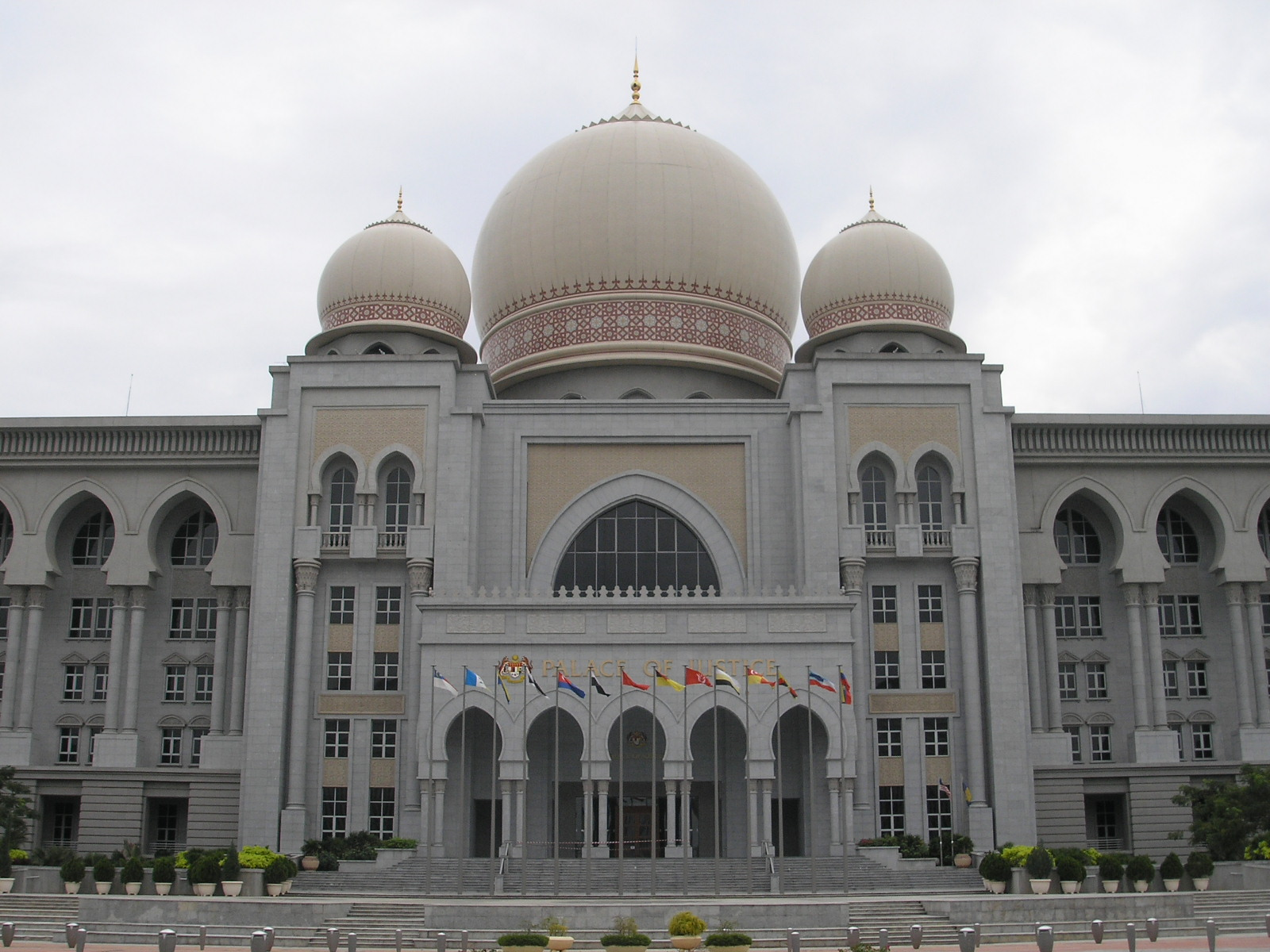
The Federal Court of Malaysia, the highest court of Malaysia where the four Banting murderers appealed against their death sentences

The four condemned appealed for the final time at the Federal Court to review their cases, and a court session was slated on 31 October 2016 to hear the appeals.

On 16 March 2017, the Federal Court delivered their verdict. The Federal Court dismissed the appeals of three appellants – N. Pathmanabhan, T. Thilaiyagan, and R. Kathavarayan – and upheld their convictions and sentences, and on the other hand, the third appellant R. Matan's appeal was allowed by the Federal Court, and he was therefore acquitted and fully discharged.

The Federal Court's five-man panel, led by Chief Justice Tun Arifin Zakaria, stated that they concluded there was overwhelming evidence to prove that the ringleader Pathmanabhan and two of his farmhands Kathavarayan and Thilaiyagan were involved in the murders, and there was a substantial window of opportunity for the trio to kill the four victims, who all died in the farm that belonged to Pathmanabhan. He noted that among the evidence, two of the sheets of zinc had bloodstains containing the DNA of Ahmad Kamil and Kamaruddin, while Noorhisham's DNA was found on the cricket bat, and the Indonesian maid Siti Hamidah Karnax also witnessed a huge fire coming from the farm, suggesting that it was lit to burn the bodies of the four victims and she also testified to hearing screams coming from the farm, which corroborated the circumstantial evidence against the trio. For this, the Federal Court confirmed the death penalty on Pathmanabhan, Thilaiyagan, and Kathavarayan and affirmed their convictions for the Banting murders.

On the other hand, in the case of Matan, the Federal Court found that the evidence was not convincing or sufficient to connect Matan to the murders. The court found that the trial judge had erred in calling for Matan to enter his defence and noted that the only evidence adduced by the prosecution was that Matan helped move the logs at the farm a day before the murders, and hence, they granted Matan an acquittal of all four counts of murder. However, Matan was not immediately released, as he was taken back to Kajang Prison, where he was formerly incarcerated on death row, before he was released later on the same day. Matan's lawyer Amer Hamzah Arshad told the press that his client was relieved with the acquittal.

== Abolition of mandatory death penalty and re-sentencing applications (2018 – 2024) ==
In October 2018, one year and seven months after Pathmanabhan, Thilaiyagan and Kathavarayan lost their final appeals, the Malaysian government announced that there would be a law review and the death penalty would be fully abolished in the country, where more than 1,100 people were held on death row for various capital crimes. The announcement sparked a huge public outcry and anger from most Malaysians, given that the country was highly supportive of capital punishment. Specifically, for the families whose loved ones were murdered, they were saddened and disappointed in the government's decision, stating that there would be no justice served if the killers who took innocent lives in cold blood were allowed to escape the gallows. Sosilawati's children were among the most vocal of the kin of these murder victims.

In November 2018, the families of Sosilawati and two other murder victims Anthony Kevin Morais and Stephen Wong Jing Kui also banded together on another occasion, urging the government to not abolish the death penalty. Sosilawati's daughter argued that the death sentence must stay for murder, and added that even in Islam, those who take the life of another should pay with theirs, and not doing so would be unfair and wrongful to the families of murder victims, including herself and her family after they lost her mother. The family of murdered activist Bill Kayong also supported this movement to oppose the abolition of capital punishment. On another occasion in January 2020, the families of eight murder victims, including Sosilawati herself and others like Annie Kok Yin Cheng and Chee Gaik Yap, gathered together to petition to the government to not abolish the death penalty.

In June 2022, after the government decided to keep the death penalty but no longer make it mandatory, Sosilawati's daughter Rita Sosilawati spoke up publicly once again, stating that she was firm on her stance to keep the mandatory death penalty, and she stated that in this case, she and her family suffered from both grief and trauma after losing a loved one, anyone who experienced a similar situation would not agree with this proposal to scrap the mandatory death penalty for murderers, and she believed that crimes involving life should be paid with life and even if the mandatory death penalty would have to be removed one day, it should not be removed in cases of brutal murders like her mother's.

Eventually, in April 2023, the Malaysian government elected to abolish both the mandatory death penalty and natural life imprisonment, and under the revised laws, any offenders convicted of murder would face either the death penalty or a jail term of 30 to 40 years. This change took effect in July 2023 and more than 1,000 death row prisoners in Malaysia were allowed to apply for a reduction of their sentences.

The three killers – Pathmanabhan, Thilaiyagan and Kathavarayan – applied for re-sentencing by the Federal Court of Malaysia. On 8 October 2024, the Federal Court heard the appeals of both Pathmanabhan and Thilaiyagan, while Kathavarayan himself elected to withdraw his re-sentencing plea and the court granted his request to not be re-sentenced, effectively finalising his death sentence. As for both Pathmanabhan and Thilaiyagan, the former's legal counsel asked to reduce the death penalty to a lengthy jail term as he gone through both pain and anguish during his time of incarceration, while the latter's defence lawyers stated that their client should be given a second chance since he was a youth offender at the time of the murders.

However, the prosecution asked for the death sentences of both Thilaiyagan and Pathmanabhan to stand, since the quadruple murders were brutal and gruesome, and there was unspeakable violence and inhumanity exhibited by the offenders in the course of these four homicides. A victim impact statement from one of Sosilawati's daughters was read out in court by the prosecution, in which she stated that her mother's death traumatised her so much that she could not bear to hear the word "Banting", due to its correlation to the murder of her mother.

On that same day, the Federal Court's three-judge panel, led by Chief Justice Tun Tengku Maimun Tuan Mat, issued their decision, ordering both Thilaiyagan and Pathmanabhan to hang for the Banting murders after they declined to commute the death sentences, which led to the duo losing their final bid to escape the gallows.

In response to the ruling, Erni Dekritawati Yuliana Buhari, Sosilawati's 39-year-old daughter, stated that her family found solace with the fact that the three perpetrators responsible for killing her mother and the three other men would be executed, although the pain of losing her mother still lingered on 14 years after the case, but Erni Dekritawati acknowledged that no matter the extent of the pain, the lives of the family had to move on.

As of 2024, the three killers – Pathmanabhan, Thilaiyagan and Kathavarayan – are still on death row awaiting execution.

== Aftermath ==
The quadruple murders of Sosilawati Lawiya and her three associates were one of the most shocking homicide cases to happen in Malaysia during the 2010s. In November 2010, a month after the murders, the six children of Sosilawati filed a lawsuit to seek a compensation of RM60 million from the perpetrators responsible for their mother's death.

From September 2017 to April 2018, local Chinese-language newspaper China Press began to publish a special series of real-life crime stories, covering the 30 most horrific crimes that happened in Malaysia since the 1970s and updated every Friday. The Banting mass murders were recorded as the 30th volume of the China Press crime story series.

In 2019, Al Jazeera filmed a documentary to cover the topic of capital punishment in Malaysia. Sosilawati's daughter Rita Sosilawati was interviewed in the documentary, and she stated that her mother died a brutal death and she greatly opposed to abolishing the death penalty, as she believed that those who commit murder should pay with their lives, and she wanted the government to understand the pain and suffering her family had gone through after losing their mother. In 2020, the Banting murders was one of the most notable cases discussed when there was a public discussion of whether the death penalty should be retained or not.

Notably, the Banting mass killings was the second legal case in the history of Malaysia where one was convicted of murder without a body. Prior to the homicides, the first case took place 47 years ago in 1963, when Singapore was still a part of Malaysia, a law student named Sunny Ang Soo Suan killed his barmaid girlfriend Jenny Cheok Cheng Kid during a scuba diving trip in the ocean near Sisters' Islands, Singapore. Ang was sentenced to death by the High Court of Singapore in 1965 after being found guilty of murder in the absence of Cheok's body and purely based on circumstantial evidence, and he was later hanged on 6 February 1967.

Chief Justice Tun Arifin Zakaria, who retired at the end of March 2017 after passing the final judgement on the condemned Banting killers, stated that it was his most memorable case when he attended a book launching event pertaining to his new book, which was a compilation of Justice Arifin's past judgments throughout his legal career. The Banting murders was the last major case heard by Justice Arifin before his retirement.

== See also ==
- Sunny Ang
- Circumstantial evidence
- Capital punishment in Malaysia
- Capital punishment in Singapore
- Murder conviction without a body
- List of murder convictions without a body
