= Baitullah =

Baitullah, an Arabic phrase ("بَيْتُ ٱللَّٰه") meaning "House of God", may refer to:

- The Kaaba, Islam's holiest site
- Any mosque
- Baitullah Mehsud (d. 2009), founder and first leader of the Tehrik-i-Taliban Pakistan
