= Archbishop of Kuala Lumpur v Menteri Dalam Negeri =

- Court: High Court in Malaya (Kuala Lumpur)
- Full case name: Titular Roman Catholic Archbishop of Kuala Lumpur v. Menteri Dalam Negeri and Kerajaan Malaysia
- Decided: 31 December 2009
- Citation: R1-25-28-2009
- Transcript: Court Judgment

Case history
- Prior actions: Home Ministry warnings and permit restrictions against The Herald
- Subsequent action: Jill Ireland v Menteri Dalam Negeri (2021)

Court membership
- Judge sitting: Justice Lau Bee Lan

Case opinions
- High Court ruled ban unconstitutional; later overturned by Court of Appeal and upheld by Federal Court

Keywords
- Constitutional law, religious freedom, judicial review, language rights

Titular Roman Catholic Archbishop of Kuala Lumpur v. Menteri Dalam Negeri (sometimes referred to as Malaysia v. The Herald) was a 2009 legal decision by the High Court of Malaya holding that Christians do not have the constitutional right to use the word "Allah" in church newspapers. An appeals court overturned a previous ruling which granted that right. This verdict on appeal was later upheld by the Federal Court of Malaysia in 2014. However, the ruling was not followed by the High Court in another case in 2021. The government lodged an appeal, but later withdrew it.

== Background ==
The Herald was issued with three warning letters by the Malaysian Home Ministry before a show cause letter was sent to its publisher on 16 July 2007. A Home Ministry official told The Sun the first warning letter was dated 10 March 2007, with the second on 16 March 2007, and the third on 1 July 2007. The official pointed out that The Herald did not print out its printing or serial number properly and carried articles that were contrary to its publishing permit. According to the government, the Catholic Herald would have its publishing permit suspended if it went ahead and publish an editorial on the Permatang Pauh by-election. An official with the Malaysian Home Ministry's publication control and al-Quran text division said this was because an editorial on the by-election was a topic under current affairs and politics. Che Din Yusof, of the government's Publications Control and Al-Quran Texts Unit said that the "reminder" was not a show-cause letter but was issued because the newsletter "focused on political issues or figures" such as Anwar Ibrahim.

The warnings were based on readings of the government's 1986 directive which banned the use of certain terms in Christian printed publications.

The Herald had come under government scrutiny for alleged repeated breaches of its permit conditions, and came out strongly in defence of itself. The Herald had assured the Malaysian Home Ministry that the authorities had nothing to worry about as the weekly was targeted at Catholics and not the general public. Its editor, Father Lawrence Andrew, said Herald had never gone beyond issues of religion in its publications. "The editorial is only asking people to pray for a just and fair by-election. Can't we Christians ask fellow Christians to pray? Is that against the law?" He also said "We comment on issues. The Pope comments on issues. It's normal for us to have an ethical interpretation" of current events and politics, Andrew said. "I don't think we were in any way going against the type of content we have chosen." "In our reply to an earlier warning letter from the same person ... we remarked that the Home Ministry had not defined the concept of religion in the application form for the renewal of printing permit, nor is there a definition of religion found in the Federal Constitution," wrote Father Lawrence Andrew, the editor of the publication, in an editorial. "So we asked them to point out where we had gone wrong. We are awaiting their reply." He defended the article, saying it does not degrade Islam or any other religion. "The article was an ethical analysis about the world after the September 11 attacks on the World Trade Center towers."

== Legal case ==
The Herald and the archbishop of the diocese of Kuala Lumpur opted to take the legal route and take the government to court to overturn the ruling on the use of the word Allah. Meanwhile, the state Islamic councils of Selangor, Terengganu, Malacca, Kedah, Johor, Penang, Federal Territory, and the Malaysian Chinese Muslim Association applied to intervene in the case. The Malaysian Gurdwaras Council informed the court that they wanted to submit a representation to the Attorney-General's Chambers in not turning this issue into a confrontation between the Catholics and Islamic Councils.

The Herald was ordered by the Malaysian government to cease printing its Malay language edition until the courts resolve a ban on the paper's use of the word Allah. The Herald newspaper editor Father Lawrence Andrew said the move was part of a series of restrictions put in place by the conservative Muslim government when it renewed the paper's licence on 30 December 2008. The Herald referred to its lawyers to check whether the Malaysian Home Ministry has the right to stop it from printing its Bahasa Malaysia edition. The Catholic Church wrote a letter to the ministry demanding that it recall its order against the use of Bahasa Malaysia when it renewed The Herald's annual publishing permit, giving the ministry seven days to reply or it would sue the government for going against the Federal Constitution.

The Herald asked the Malaysian High Court to intervene in a court case involving the use of the word Allah by the newspaper. The Archbishop of Kuala Lumpur, Tan Sri Murphy Pakiam, who also acted as the publisher of the Herald, submitted himself as the plaintiff. The application was filed on 22 December 2007. In his statement, Archbishop Pakiam was seeking a declaratory relief that the Herald was entitled to use the word Allah and that the word should not exclusive to Islam. He also was seeking a declaration that the minister's directive to cease the use of the word Allah in the Herald was illegal and null and void. One of the reasons for the government ban was concern that Malay language news content which used the word Allah to describe God in a non-Muslim context would confuse followers of Islam in Malaysia. In Herald's case notes, it was noted that word Allah was simply Arabic for "the God", and the Quran says that Allah is the same god worshiped by Jews and Christians. Thus Muslims in English-speaking areas like North America will often use the word God in place of Allah, and Christians in Arabic-speaking nations like Egypt will say Allah for God, even in church.

On the ruling by the Malaysian government on 27 February 2008, The Herald's editor stated that the controversial ban on the word Allah to mean God for non-Muslims is still in place. Father Lawrence quoting a letter dated 16 February 2009, said that the printing, publishing, sale, issue, circulation and possession of any document and publication relating to Christianity containing the words Allah, Kaabah, Baitullah and Solat were prohibited unless on the front cover of the document and publication are written with the words "FOR CHRISTIANITY" in font type Arial of size 16 in bold.

On 26 February 2009, The Herald got permission to use the word Allah on its masthead, provided it clearly states that the magazine is 'For Christians only'. This was stated in the recently gazetted order under Internal Security Act signed by the Home Minister Syed Hamid Albar on 16 February. However, on 28 February 2009, the Home Ministry rescinded the government gazette that allowed conditional use of the word Allah in Christian publications. The government's decision to ban the use of the word Allah in The Herald remained in force until the court decided otherwise.

=== High Court ruling and aftermath ===
On 31 December 2009, the Kuala Lumpur High Court ruled in favour of The Herald, stating that even though Islam is the federal religion of the country, this does not empower the government to prohibit the use of the word Allah. It also found that the word Allah was not exclusive to Muslims.

The ruling emphasised that use of the "Allah" by Christians is protected by the constitution as long as it is not used to proselytise Muslims. The court determined that the home minister considered irrelevant factors when deciding to prohibit the use of "Allah" by The Herald.

However the government began to appeal the decision made by Justice Lau Bee Lan, leading to a Court of Appeal overturning the 2009 court ruling, stating the term "Allah" must be exclusive to Islam or it could cause public disorder. In turn, the Catholic Church appealed the decision of the Court of Appeal, to the Federal Court of Malaysia (the highest court in Malaysia), which in June 2014 upheld the Court of Appeal decision, ruling that there was no constitutional right for non-Muslims to use the word "Allah".

Nevertheless, the use of Allah is not prohibited in the two Malaysian states of Sabah and Sarawak in Borneo as they have already been using it since a long time ago and both states do not have similar Islamic state laws as those in West Malaysia.

== Reaction ==
Several acts of arson and vandalism have been carried out against churches in Malaysia since the Herald decision on 31 December 2009. The government has responded by increasing security at places of worship and condemning the attacks.

The Malaysian opposition has criticised the government's handling of the Herald case and the resulting protests. Some opposition leaders claim that these protests, together with the government handling of the 'Allah' controversy may have been the prime reason for the church attacks.

The law firm representing The Herald was burgled on 14 January 2010 and a lawyer's laptop and cash was found to be missing.

== Jill Ireland v Menteri Dalam Negeri (2021) ==
After the court decision, Jill Ireland, a Christian from Sarawak whose Christian literature had been confiscated by customs officers, put forward a case noting that the 2014 case was looking at the use of the world ‘Allah’ in isolation. In a judgment handed down on March 17, 2021, High Court Judge Datuk Nor Bee Ariffin noted that the Directive being used was ‘illegal’, ‘irrational’ and ‘unconstitutional’.

The 2021 ruling noted that Christians can use the word ‘Allah’, as well as ‘kaabah’, ‘solat’ and ‘baitullah’.

== See also ==
- Religion in Malaysia
- Law of Malaysia
