= Robert Lam =

Malaysian newscaster

Robert Lam Ban Hoong (4 April 1945 – 23 January 2010) Broadcaster, Educator, Public Speaker

Robert Lam was a popular Malaysian newscaster and known for his clear English, whose steady voice and reassuring manner was heard across the country for more than twenty years. While he is chiefly remembered for the primetime bulletins he delivered each night, he was also dedicated to improving the public's command of English.

== Early life and influences ==
Born in Ipoh, Perak, during the final months of World War II, Robert grew up in a household that valued English above most other skills. His father, a village councillor during the British era, was known for drafting formal letters that even colonial officers would approve. Neighbours regularly came seeking his father’s help, and the steady rhythm of these conversations left an indelible impression on young Robert, teaching him the power of clear, correct speech.

Surrounded by books and after-school grammar drills, he came to believe that language, like music, allowed people to express what mattered most. Lam credited his father for laying that first brick and remembered Miss Yip at Anderson School, Ipoh for gently pushing him to excel in English. His early church days shaped him, too. As a youth leader in the Assembly of God, he spoke to the pews on Saturday evenings—honing the ease and warmth that would later define his public speaking.

== Service in the Air Force ==
In 1966, Lam joined the Royal Malaysian Air Force Flying Training College, rising to the rank of Lieutenant (Air). Though it was peacetime, he flew ration drops to remote jungle posts during the communist insurgency, narrowly avoiding crashes more than once. Reflecting on those days, he would often say that nothing compared to the freedom of "seeing God’s creation from the clouds."

Military life instilled in him a deep sense of discipline, attention to detail, and the need for purposeful communication—skills that would serve him well as a broadcaster.

== A voice for the nation ==
Broadcasting came into Robert’s life almost by chance. One evening, while listening to the news on RTM, he thought, I could do that better. Acting on impulse, he sent a letter to the station. After a six-month wait, RTM invited him to audition. His first attempt was met with honest critiques—his voice was too polished, his manner a little stiff. Lam took the feedback in stride, diving into phonetics, newspapers, and mirror drills. When he returned for a second try, his persistence paid off.

He began reading regional bulletins, and before long, producers promoted him to the national desk. At the same time, he pursued insurance and management courses in London, balancing lectures with late-night voice breaks. The balancing act lasted six years until RTM’s internal shake-up phased out freelance anchors.

Though briefly disappointed, Lam found new opportunities. In 1984, broadcasting veteran Ahmad Merican invited him to join TV3, the country’s first private channel. Lam declined a full-time position but remained a regular news anchor for years, delivering with quiet authority long after many of his peers had moved on.

His calm smile and polished delivery made him a household name. For countless Malaysians, his voice was the daily news. He later retired for a short time before returning as a news anchor for Metrovision in the late 1990 till it dissolved in 1999.

== Beyond Broadcasting ==
Robert Lam’s influenced many places other than television screens. He became one of Malaysia’s most sought-after presenters and emcees. He attempted to put care into each of his engagements, often rehearsing up to ten times before going on stage.

Identifying a national need for improved English communication, Lam established the Robert Lam English Language Centre, committed to promoting English mastery across Malaysia. The centre offered practical training in pronunciation, diction, and grammar, and expanded to include branches in Kuantan and Kuala Terengganu. Through hundreds of engagements—by his own count, more than 190 institutions—Lam enriched thousands of lives with his passion for language.

Unlike contemporaries such as Patrick Teoh, Lam avoided the entertainment industry, staying true to his calling as a communicator and educator. He firmly believed that strong communication could change lives—and even transform nations.

== Final years and legacy ==
Robert Lam died on 23 January 2010, aged 64, after a battle with metastatic melanoma. He died at University Malaya Medical Centre, leaving behind not just a long career in broadcasting, but also a legacy of mentorship, teaching, and national pride in the English language.

He is survived by his wife, son, and daughter.

Though Robert Lam was known as a pilot, broadcaster, educator, speaker he was mainly a communicator.
