= Duta Palma =

Palm oil company from Indonesia

Duta Palma is a palm oil company from Indonesia. It is a subsidiary of Darmex Agro Holdings. It has significant land banks.

The Military of Indonesia has or used to have a 30% investment in Duta Palma. Many prominent former military men have positions within the company. There were concerns over rainforest destruction. Duta Palma is said to be one of the companies with the worst track record of burning. Roundtable on Sustainable Palm Oil issued a membership termination letter to PT Dutapalma Nusantara in 2013 The owner of Duta Palma Surya Damandi has been charged for corruption for bribing the local authority to convert reserved land for plantation. The arrest warrant issued on the 9th August 2019.
