= Government Transformation Programme (Malaysia) =

Effort by Malaysia's Government

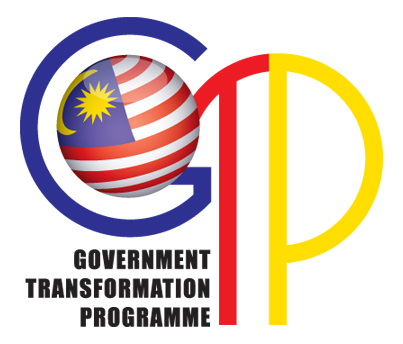
Government Transformation Programme (GTP) logo

The Government Transformation Programme (GTP) is an effort by Malaysia's Government to address seven key areas concerning the people of the country. The programme was unveiled on 28 January 2010, by Prime Minister Najib Razak, and is expected to contribute in making the country a developed and high-income nation as per its Vision 2020.

The Programme was created to support Najib's 1Malaysia concept and motto of "People First, Performance Now" and was planned to be implemented until 2012 as a foundation for the transformation of Malaysia.

Six initial National Key Results Areas (NKRAs) which were derived from surveys with the nation's citizens and following months of evaluating the people's demands of the Government and the most pressing issues were selected to develop the NKRAs. In July 2011, a 7th NKRA was announced to address another pressing issue of inflation and rising daily cost of the people. A focused list of projects and initiatives for each NKRA was developed to ensure that big fast results for specific targets are achieved.

The NKRAs are the responsibility of relevant Ministries and the Performance Delivery and Management Unit (PEMANDU) was initiated to monitor the achievements of each Ministry. The NKRAs and its detailed targets were made public with the publishing of the GTP Roadmap.

Following the first year in implementation, majority of the NKRAs achieved more than 90% of their targets and the results were also made available via the GTP Annual Report 2010.

== The National Key Results Areas (NKRAs) ==
The National Key Results Areas (NKRAs) under the GTP were identified to improve the socio-economic growth of Malaysia.

The NKRAs are the priority needs of the people. It represents a combination of short-term priorities to address urgent public demands and equally important long-term issues affecting the people that required the Government's attention immediately.

The initial six NKRAs are Reducing Crime, Fighting Corruption, Improving Student Outcomes, Raising Living Standards of Low Income Households, Improving Rural Basic Infrastructure and Improving Urban Public Transport that have been under the GTP since its introduction in 2010.

The NKRAs are collectively owned by the Cabinet, with accountability for delivery resting on a Lead Minister, appointed and formally monitored by the Prime Minister. In July 2011, a 7th NKRA – Addressing Cost of Living was announced to address another pressing issue of inflation and rising daily cost of the people.

Each NKRA is headed by a Ministry and the Minister is subject to the Ministerial Key Result Area (MKRA), which is a direct measurement of the targets to the outcome. The Performance Management and Delivery Unit (PEMANDU) was initiated to oversee the progress of each Ministry.

| NKRAs | HEADED BY |
|---|---|
| Reducing Crime | Minister of Home Affairs |
| Fighting Corruption | Minister in the Prime Minister's Department, in charge of Law |
| Improving Student Outcomes | Minister of Education |
| Raising Living Standards of Low-Income Households | Minister of Women, Family and Community Development |
| Improving Rural Basic Infrastructure | Minister of Rural and Regional Development |
| Improving Urban Public Transport | Minister of Transport |
| Addressing Cost of Living | Deputy Prime Minister |

Areas not covered by the NKRAs but deemed important will receive attention from the Government at the ministerial level. The MKRAs include the targeted outcomes that the people of Malaysia can see and feel (e.g. responding to public complaints and reducing the number of road traffic accidents).

=== Reducing Crime ===
The Reducing Crime NKRA looks at revitalising the criminal justice system to improve all operative layers of addressing crime in Malaysia.

Since the implementation, several measurable key results were announced such as nationwide crime reduced, violent crime cases cleared, police station ranking and more personnel mobilised to frontline duty. Specific action plans have been laid out to achieve this goal.

=== Fighting Corruption ===
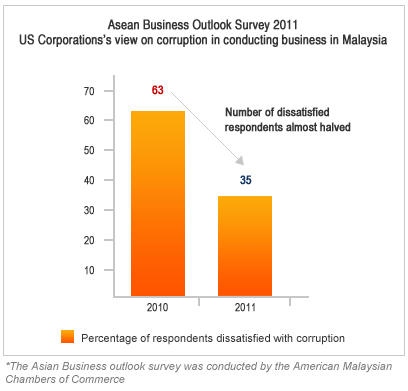
US Corporations' view on corruption in conducting business in Malaysia

Corruption has been a long fought battle in Malaysia. The cost of corruption to the nation is significant, potentially amounting to as much as RM10 billion a year, or 1–2% of GDP.

A key result aimed during the course of the GTP is to improve the internal perception of corruption. Corporate bodies in the country are also encouraged to sign a pledge to battle corruption in their business activities and operations in Malaysia known as The Corporate Integrity Pledge.

=== Improving Students Outcomes ===
Though Malaysia has achieved a 92% adult literacy rate, continuous efforts are needed to strengthen the core of Malaysian societal layers to ensure that quality education is accessible to all Malaysians.

The GTP targets to create a holistic growth in the education sector by addressing fundamental issues like pre-school education and basic literacy and numeracy skills through the programmes announced.

Performance based assessment for Principals and Head Teachers with rewards and consequences clearly drawn out. This is to emphasise the fact that a good leader can create credible results for the whole school. Rewards will be in the form of financial and non-financial recognition while underperformers will be sent to undergo development management and remedial programmes to assist their performance.

To assist underperforming schools achieve the High Performing School status gradually. The efforts under this programme will take place following the School Performance Ranking. An automated tool will be provided to study specific needs of each school under the programme and assist the Principals/ Head Teachers to plan better for the school. Approved plans will be provided with support tools for implementation. The NKRA aims to reduce the number of Band 6 and 7 schools by 20% and increase the number of Band 1 and 2 schools by 8% in the course of the GTP.

=== Raising Living Standards of Low-Income Households ===
The Raising Living Standard of Low-Income Households NKRA is aimed to empower low income households to improve their social standing and create more income opportunities.

Besides defining and identifying the poor, the NKRA also aims to create a long term system that helps create opportunities for the underprivileged. Among the initiatives are creating job opportunities, increasing basic wage, finding business opportunities and providing welfare assistance.

=== Improving Rural Basic Infrastructure ===
35% of the Malaysian population live in rural areas with minimal access to proper roads, water and electricity supply. These elements are basic human rights and should be accessible to all Malaysians regardless of location and economic background. The availability of these facilities will also develop the socio-economic status of the rural population.

The pace of deployment especially to East Malaysia has to be increased to ensure these basic rights are delivered for the long run in the identified areas. The target is to build 11 times as many kilometres of roads, 2.5 times as many houses, 5 times as many houses with electricity and connect seven times as many houses to clean water during the activation of the GTP.

1,900 km of the planned roads will be in Sabah and Sarawak. The achievement of this will mean that 91.4% of the population will be living within a five kilometre radius to a paved road by 2010 in Peninsular Malaysia.

Existing administrative processes will also be revamped to reduce time on paperwork- e.g. open road tender process. Application of standard templates and parallel processes where applicable. Collaborations amongst all state and federal government agencies have significantly improved with better communication and effective problem solution methodologies implemented through the years.

==== Ensure access to clean or treated water ====
This will mean in Sabah and Sarawak, the percentage of rural houses with access to clean or treated water will reach approximately 60% in 2010 and 89% in 2012, a significant increase from 57% currently. Finding least cost and fast ways to deliver through usage of alternative sources like tube wells, gravity wells or rain water recovery for areas that are distant from reticulation networks (piped water supplies).

Improved communications amongst government agencies, contractors and consultants speeded up construction works on site, thus creating effective and high intensity workforces throughout the project periods.

=== Improving Urban Public transport ===
Despite its necessity, the quality of urban transport was not commendable with constant complaints. The lack of an integrated system prompted the development of the Improving Urban Public Transport NKRA. This NKRA will address the issues of efficiency, connectivity and convenience of the urban public transport system.

As a big achievement, the GTP is looking to create a higher demand for public transport by improving the overall availability and efficiency of the system. Furthermore, seamless connectivity is also aimed to be achieved to ensure key urban areas are well linked.

Single point accountability through the Land Public Transport Authority (SPAD- Suruhanjaya Pengangkutan Awam Darat)-fully operational by end 2010 to manage policy planning and regulatory oversight. The Authority will tie in the 12 Ministries currently involved in the different aspects of public transport.

=== Addressing Cost of Living ===
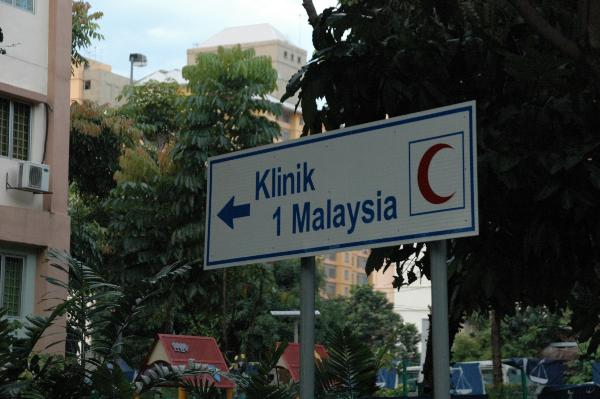
Klinik 1Malaysia

Malaysia's inflation rate stands at 3.4% as of September 2011.

The objective is to reduce/ subsidise these rising daily costs to ensure people have a better money flow to manage with their expenses. These initiatives will be developed and adjusted to suit the requirements of the people. Some initiatives provide immediate relied while the rest were implemented to ensure that people experience an improving living condition in the long run.
