= 2010 Air Untuk Rakyat rally =

The 2010 Air Untuk Rakyat rally was a rally held in Kuala Lumpur, Malaysia, on 5 December 2010. The rally organiser, the Air Untuk Rakyat movement and federal opposition Pakatan Rakyat, had called the protest regarding the privatisation of water management in Selangor state which surrounds the capital, Kuala Lumpur and the federal government's bailout of SYABAS, a water distribution firm controlled by associate of the UMNO-led federal government crony Rozali Ismail. A secondary objective of the rally was to hand over a petition with over 250,000 signatures to the King Tuanku Mizan Zainal Abidin to intervene against the privatisation of the water services in the state at the Istana Negara.

According to various estimates the rally attracted between 2,500 to 10,000 people. The rally started gathering outside the National Mosque in Kuala Lumpur at 9 o'clock, early Sunday morning on 5 December 2010.

== Police actions ==
All the roads leading to Istana Negara and the National Mosque were guarded and blocked a day before by police causing a massive traffic jams in various parts of the city. At least 60 people were arrested by the Malaysian police who considered the gathering illegal. The police used tear gas and water cannons to disperse the crowd.
