= Tanjong Sepat, Selangor =

Town in Kuala Langat District, Selangor, Malaysia

Coordinates: 2°40′22″N 101°31′37″E

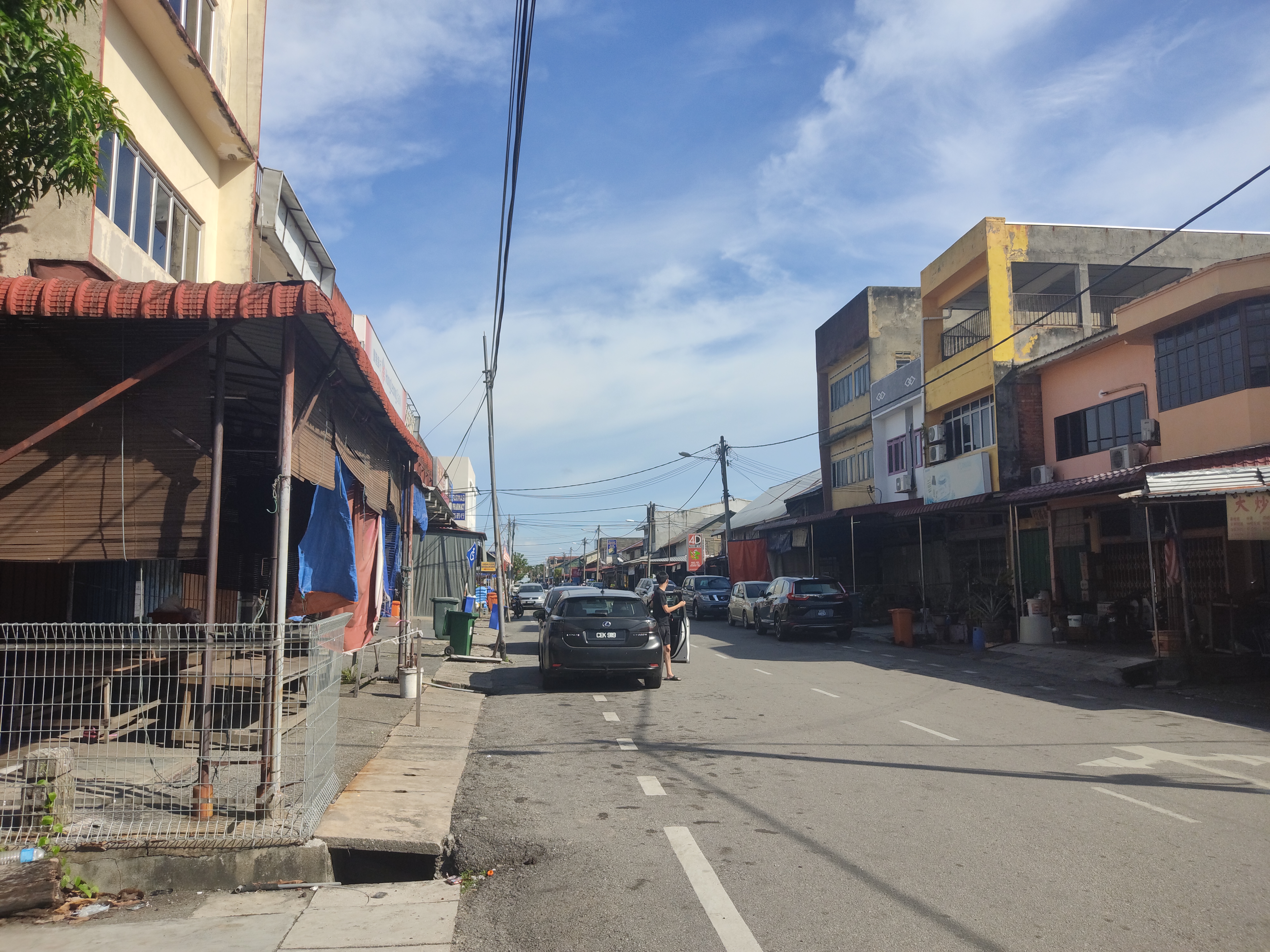
Tanjong Sepat town

Tanjong Sepat in Kuala Langat District

Tanjong Sepat (also known as Tanjung Sepat) (Jawi: تنجوڠ سڤت) is a town in Kuala Langat District, Selangor, Malaysia. It is on the Strait of Malacca. It is administered by the Zone 24 of the Kuala Langat Municipal Council. Kampung Kundang is a village located nearby.

Tanjong Sepat is primarily a fishing town. Most of the inhabitants have some kind of connection to the fishing industry, although the relative importance of fishing to the economy is dwindling due to pollution in the Straits of Malacca.

Tanjong Sepat is well known locally for its many seafood restaurants. The most famous dish is the seafood steamboat. Steamed buns, known as Baozi, are also well known in Tanjung Sepat. Many people visit Tanjong Sepat to buy buns during the holidays. People also visit the Gano Farm mushroom farm to view the various types of the mushrooms cultivated there. There is a couple's bridge in Tanjong Sepat, but it collapsed in 2013 and the rebuilding process was eventually completed 5 years later, in 2018.
