= Balak Island =

Island in Malaysia

- Interactive map of Balak Island

Geography
- Coordinates: 7°7′59.99″N 117°7′59.99″E

Administration
- Malaysia
- State: Sabah
- Division: Kudat
- District: Kudat

Balak Island (Malay: Pulau Balak) is an island located near Banggi Island in the Kudat Division on Sabah, Malaysia.

== See also ==
- List of islands of Malaysia
