= Buwaning Island =

Island of Malaysia

- Interactive map of Buwaning Island

Geography
- Location: Sulu Sea
- Coordinates: 6°58′40.08″N 117°29′56.76″E

Administration
- Malaysia
- State: Sabah
- Division: Kudat
- District: Kudat

Buwaning Island (Malay: Pulau Buwaning) is an island located near Pitas district in Sabah, Malaysia.

== See also ==
- List of islands of Malaysia
