= Bankawan Island =

Island in Malaysia

- Interactive map of Bankawan Island

Geography
- Coordinates: 7°13′59.99″N 117°18′0.01″E

Administration
- Malaysia
- State: Sabah
- Division: Kudat
- District: Kudat

Bankawan Island (Malay: Pulau Bankawan) is an island located on Kudat district in Sabah, Malaysia.

== See also ==
- List of islands of Malaysia
