= Malawali Island =

Island in Malaysia

- Interactive map of Malawali Island

Geography
- Location: Tun Mustapha Marine Park
- Coordinates: 7°3′9″N 117°18′6″E
- Archipelago: Borneo
- Adjacent to: Balabac Strait
- Area: 39 km^{2} (15 sq mi)
- Length: 8.3 km (5.16 mi)
- Width: 6 km (3.7 mi)
- Highest elevation: 138 m (453 ft)

Administration
- Malaysia
- State: Sabah
- Division: Kudat
- District: Kudat

Malawali (Malay: Pulau Malawali) is an island in the state of Sabah, Malaysia located in the Sulu Sea. It is located within the Kudat Division, and sits nearby the islands of Banggi and Balambangan. The island is surrounded by coral reefs and is a popular diving spot on the north-east coast of Sabah.

== See also ==
- List of islands of Malaysia
