= Tip of Borneo =

Cape in north Borneo, Malaysia

The Tip of Borneo
- Malay: Tanjung Simpang Mengayau; Rungus: Tanjung Sampang Mangazou
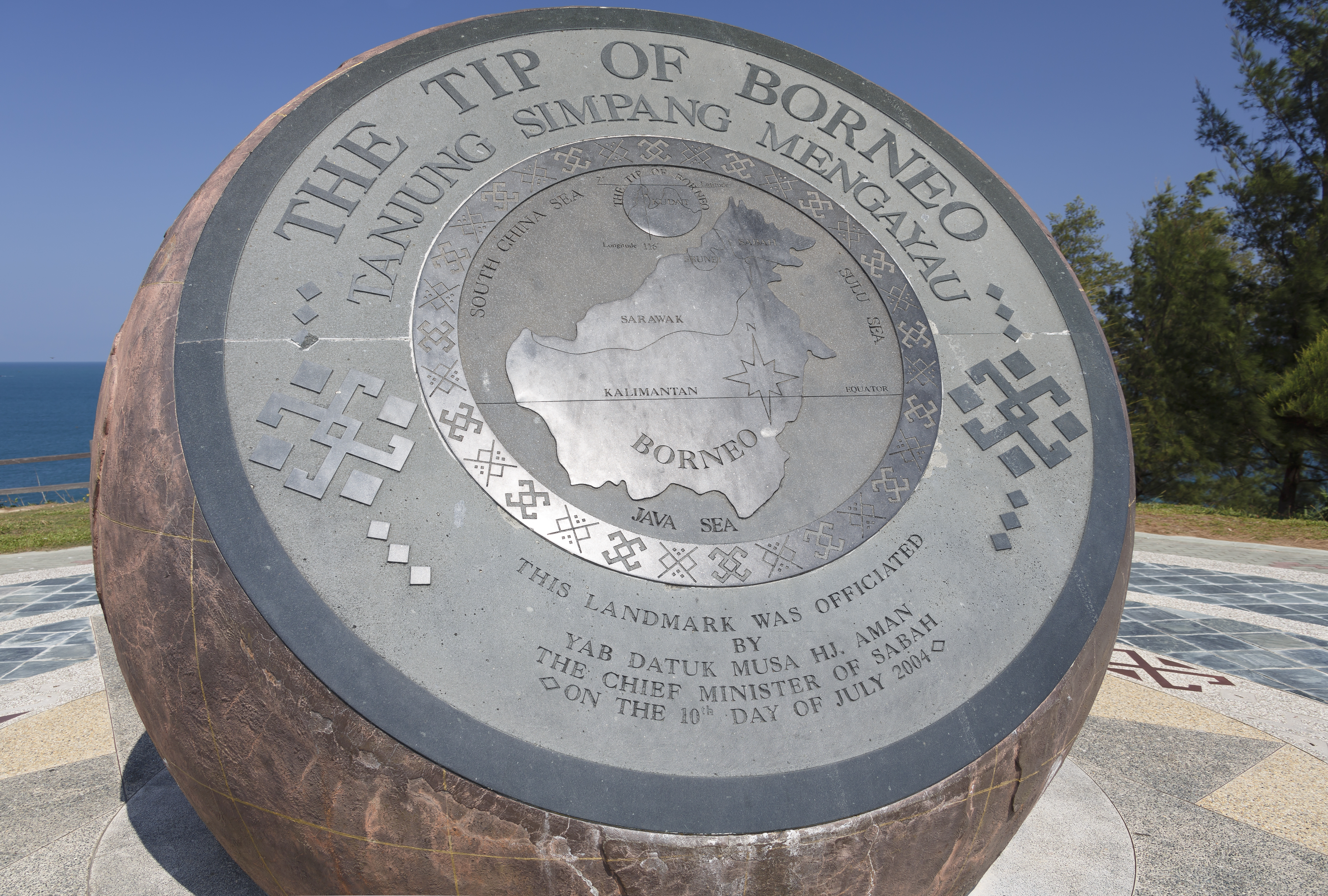
- The bronze globe.
- Interactive map of The Tip of Borneo
- Location: Kudat Division, Sabah, Malaysia
- Coordinates: 7°2′4″N 116°44′54″E
- Opening date: 2004
- Dedicated to: Marks the northernmost point of Borneo island

The Tip of Borneo (Malay: Tanjung Simpang Mengayau; Rungus: Tanjung Sampang Mangazou) is the northernmost tip of Borneo located in Kudat District, Sabah, Malaysia. The tip marks the meeting point of the South China Sea and Sulu Sea.

== Geology ==
The tip as part of the Kudat Peninsula was formed through the Kudat formation in the Early Miocene age. The Kudat formation is divided into three major lithological unit, namely the lower, middle and upper units based on significant changes in the composition of the sediments. The lower unit consisted mostly of sandstone and mudstone with the sandy beds predominating, the middle unit consisted of sandstone and mudstone with some occurrence of limestone beds and lenses, and the upper unit consisted of sandstone and mudstone of various proportions mainly in the southern part of the Peninsula.

== History ==
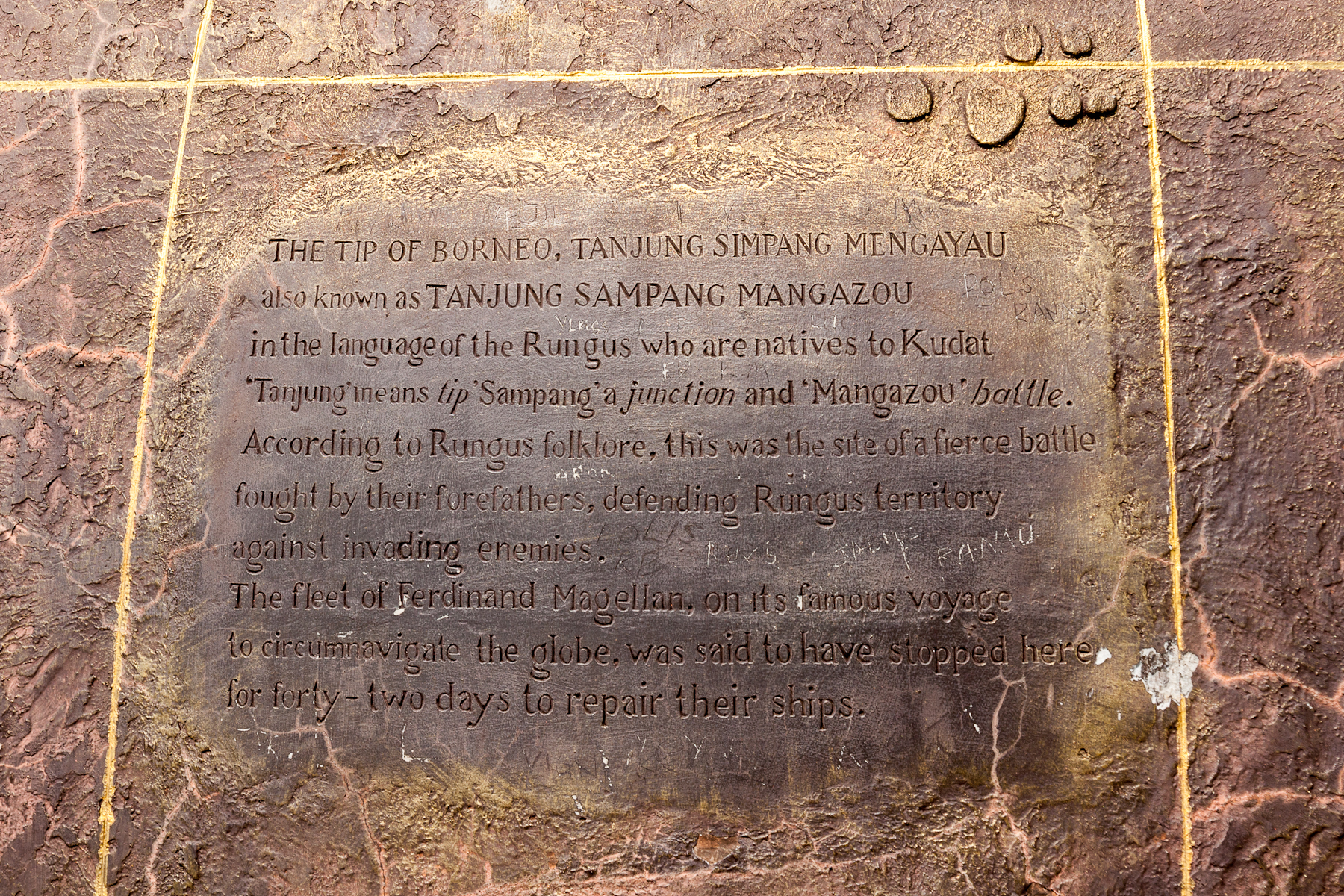
Inscription on the tip history.

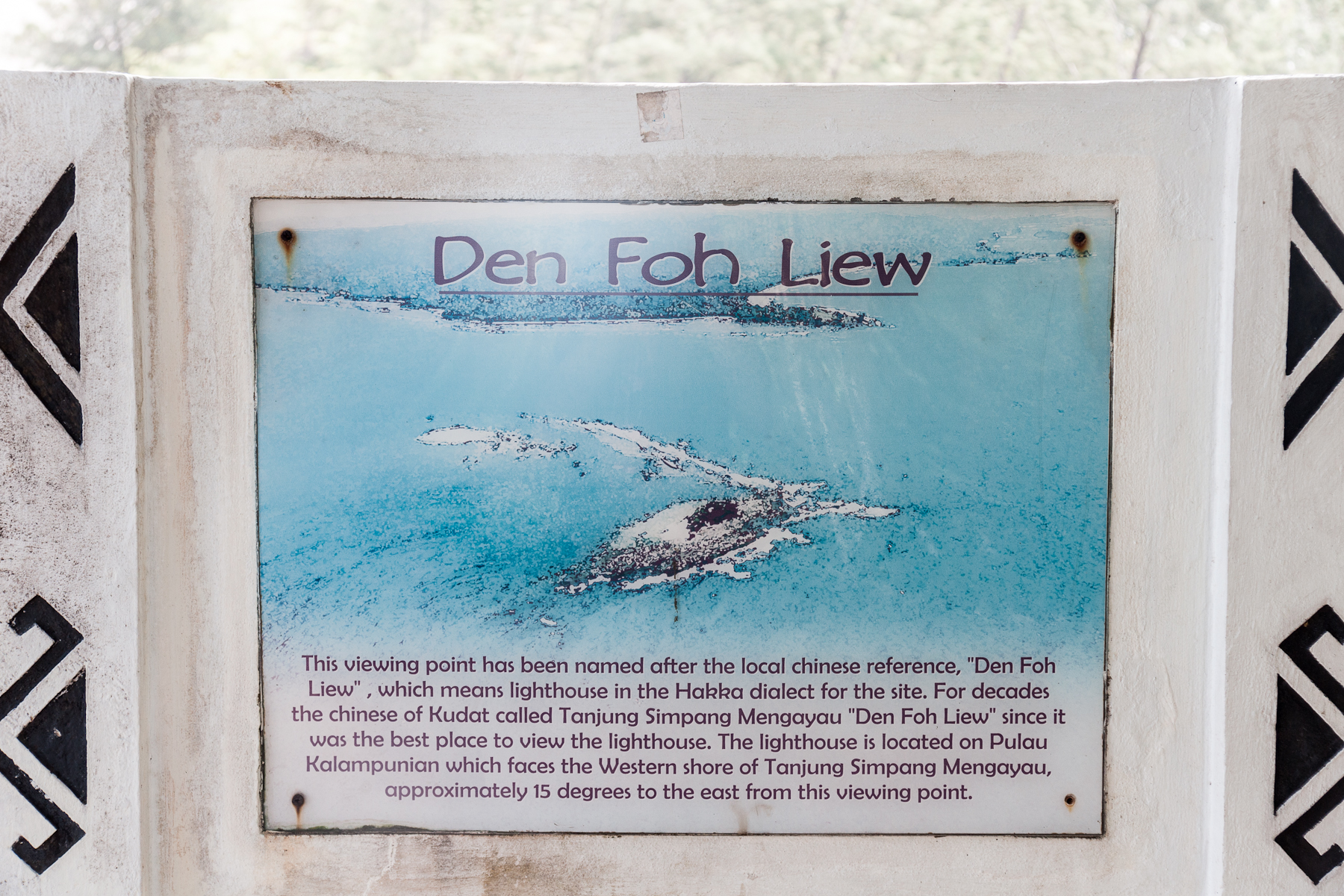
Inscription on the Chinese reference on the area.

The original name of Tanjung Sampang Mangazou comes from the language of the indigenous Rungus, an ethnic group which resides mainly in the district of Kudat. The words Tanjung (cape), Sampang (union) and Mangazou (battle) refers to this location of a battle that occurred when the ethnic Rungus defended their territory against the attack from Moro Pirates. (Note: Found in the inscription on the back of the bronze globe.) According to legend, this place was a favourite landing point for the pirates.

Local Chinese people referring the place as Den Foh Liew, which in Hakka means "lighthouse" due to a lighthouse on a nearby island of Kalampunian Island can be seen from here. The lighthouse also serves as a reminder of treacherous coastline and past shipwrecks since during the Chinese dynasties era of Song, Ming and Qing, many Chinese trading vessels were capsized while on their way to Celebes Islands, to reach Moluccas (which is known as the Spice Islands). During the famous circumnavigation era, Ferdinand Magellan fleet supposedly went here to perform repairs on his ships.

== Features ==
The tip is one of Sabah's popular tourist attractions. Within the area, there is a park-like grounds with a Malaysian flag pole and a large bronze globe which opened since 2004. The bronze globe marks the location of the Borneo Island tip at latitude 7 degrees north and longitude 116 degrees east with a map featuring the island embossed in bronze and laid on a flat surface at an angle with inscriptions to mark the tip. Over the years, several infrastructure and public amenities have been erected at the site which including a public rest area with a café, souvenir shop and washrooms. In the park-like grounds, it has become one of the destination to view sunsets and full moons.

Located not far from the tip is the Hibiscus Villa with panoramic views of the South China Sea amid a lushly landscaped one-hectare tropical garden, once described by Lonely Planet as "the place where Jay-Z and GQ magazine would throw the mother of all Southeast Asian parties".

=== Additional addition of facilities ===
The Tip of Borneo was closed since January 2022 for facilities improvement under the Twelfth Malaysia Plan (12MP) until it was reopened to the public in May 2025.

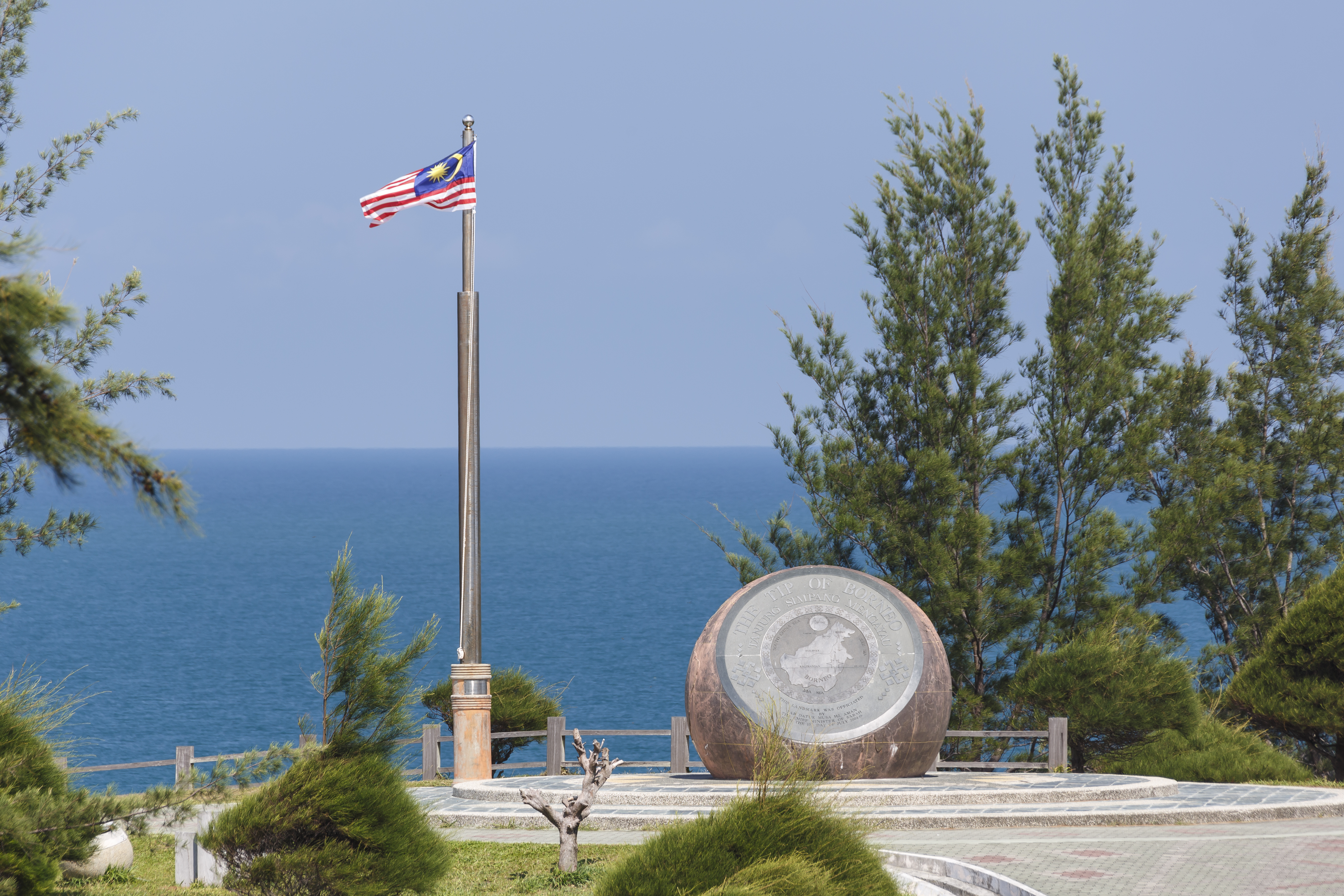
The park-like grounds.

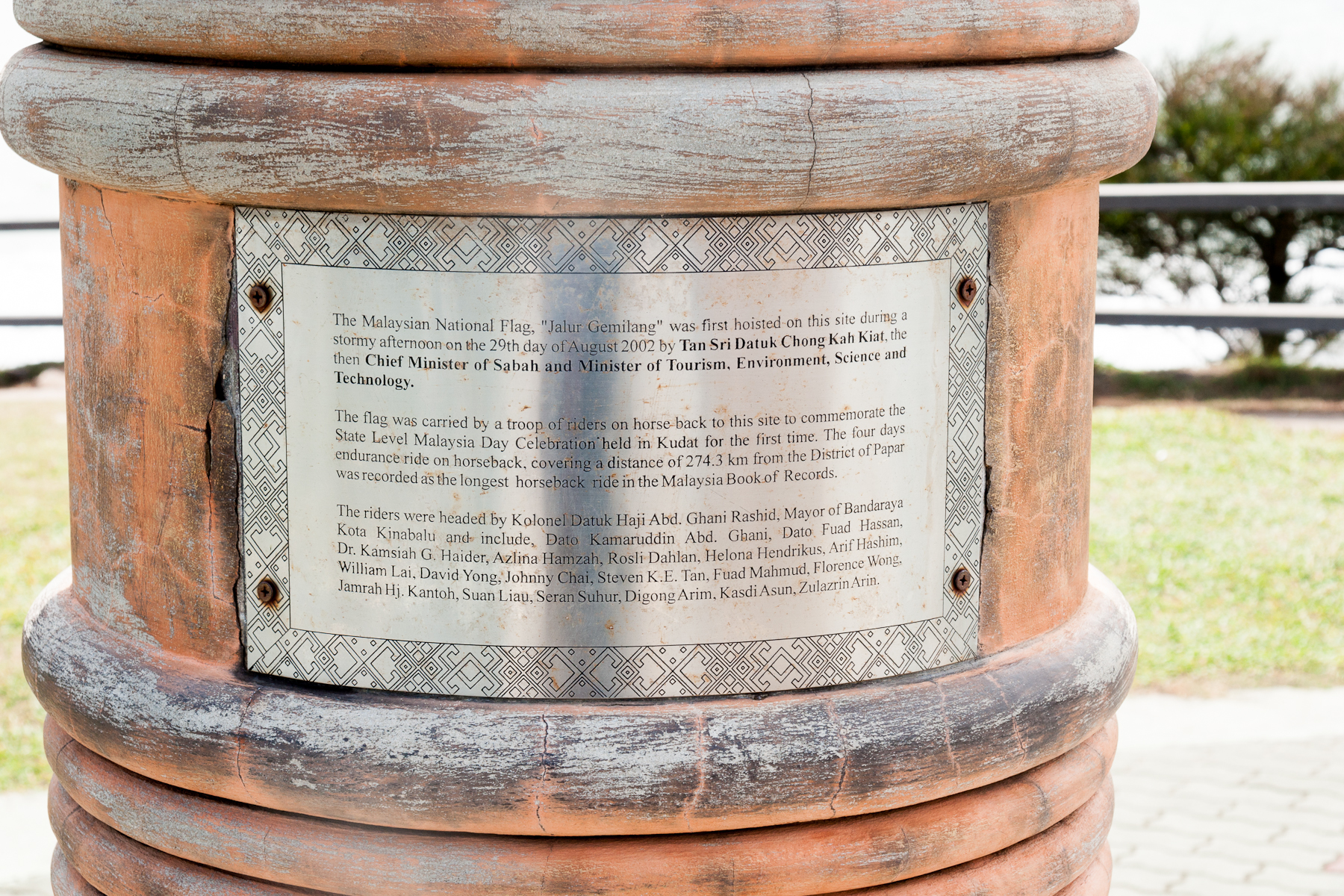
Inscription regarding the park history.

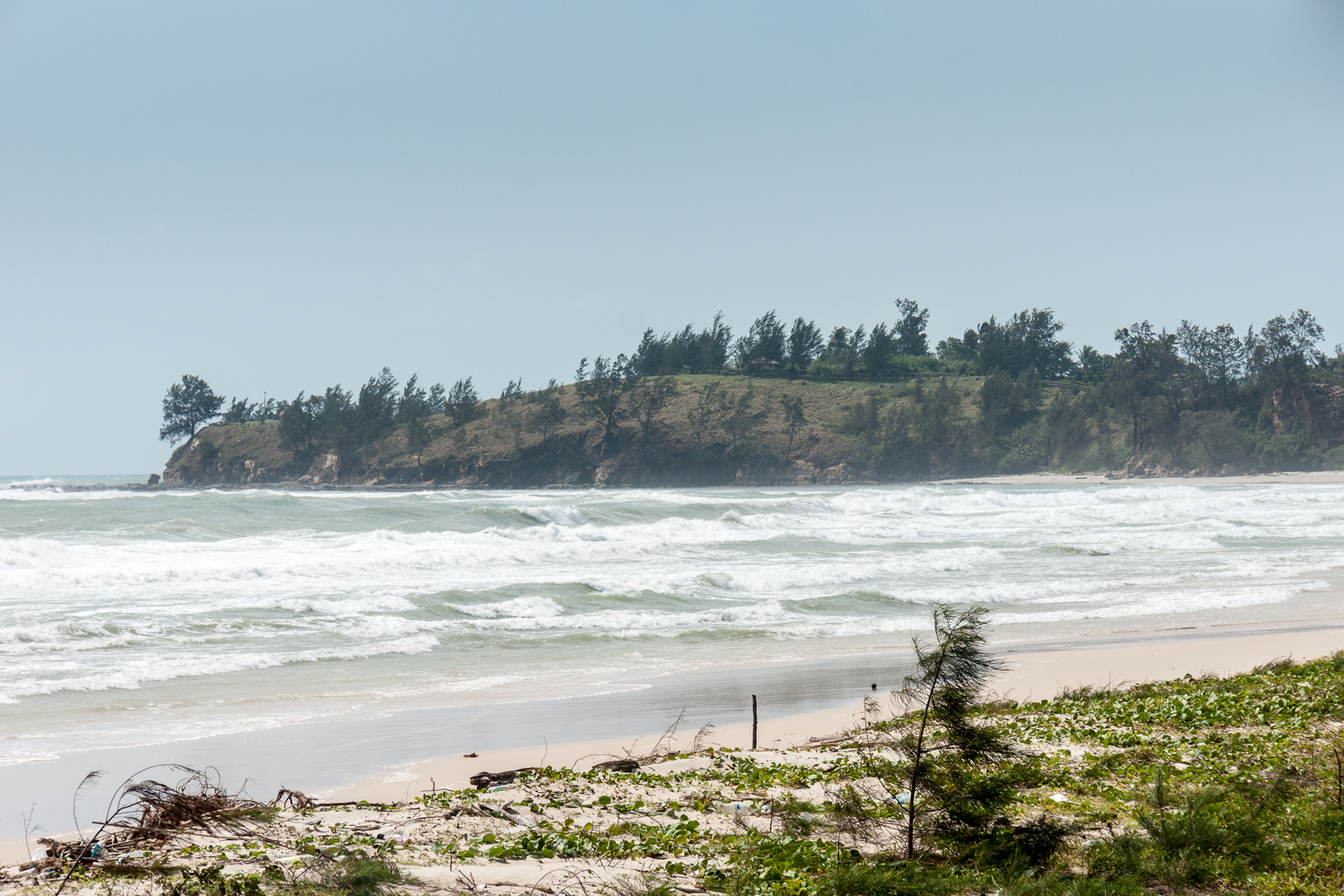
Sea wave in the tip.

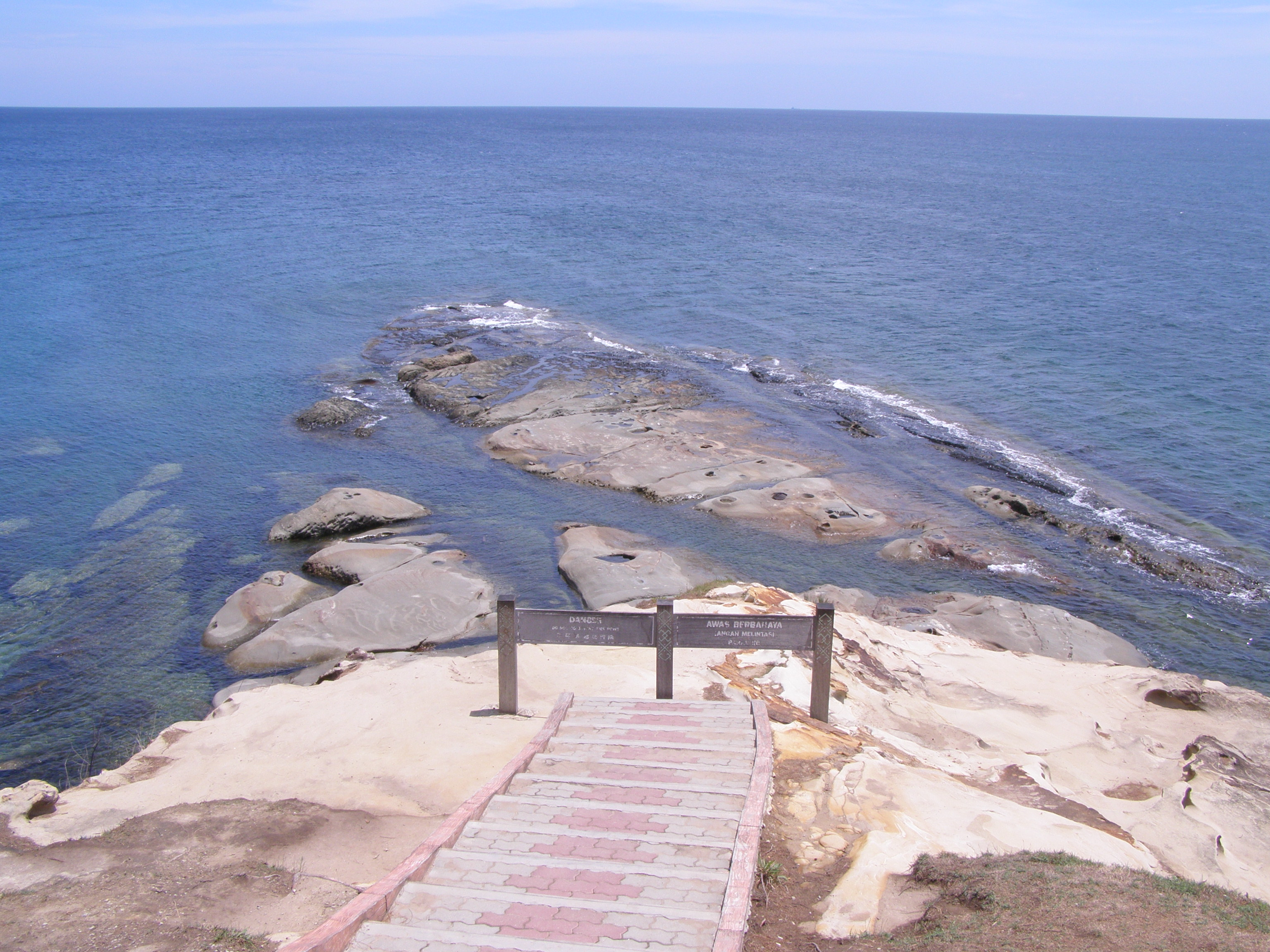
The limit for visitors walk.
