= Tun Mustapha Marine Park =

Marine park in Malaysia

- IUCN category II (national park)
- Location within Borneo
- Location: Sabah, Malaysia
- Nearest city: Kudat
- Coordinates: 7°15′0″N 117°10′0″E
- Area: 8,988 km^{2} (3,470 sq mi)
- Established: 2016
- Governing body: Sabah Parks

Tun Mustapha Marine Park is a marine park located off the north coast of the state of Sabah, Malaysia. It comprises an area of 898,762.76 hectares with more than 50 islands and islets located across Kudat, Pitas and Kota Marudu districts; making it the second largest gazetted marine park in the country after the Luconia Shoals in neighbouring Sarawak.

The marine park consists of four zones: the protection, community, multiple-used, and commercial fishing areas. Around 80 thousand people are dependent on the marine park for resources, including various local Sabah and Filipino indigenous ethnics such as the Dusun, Rungus, Sama-Bajau and Suluk.

== History ==
The area was originally proposed to be gazetted by the Sabah state government since 2003, shortly after the recognition as a significant marine conservation area. Initial assessment and consultation was done in the 2000s, and by 2011, a steering committee was formed by Sabah Parks to lead the establishment of the park, along with management and zoning plans. In 2012, a special expedition was conducted to assess its biodiversity and ecology, and its he socioeconomic benefits for surrounding coastline residents, involving representatives from Universiti Malaysia Sabah, Naturalis Biodiversity Center, Sabah Parks, and the Malaysian branch of the World Wide Fund for Nature (WWF), with high amounts of coral species were identified, along with a prominent marine ecosystem, and risks such as overfishing and fish bombing. In 2016, all the islands and islets inside the area was gazetted as a marine park, including the three major islands of Banggi, Balambangan and Malawali. During the time, the area was also become a part of the Sulu Sulawesi Marine Ecoregion Programme, and the Coral Triangle Initiative for Coral Reefs, Fisheries and Food Security (CTI-CFF) initiatives.

== Biodiversity ==
Tun Mustapha Marine Park is also home to several dolphin species, including the Indo-Pacific bottlenose dolphin (Tursiops aduncus), Indo-Pacific humpback dolphins (Sousa chinensis), and Indo-Pacific finless porpoises (Neophocaena phocaenoides). Other marine megafauna include green sea turtles, mobula rays, and marlins. Coasts on the Borneo mainland and islands throughout the park are known as established turtle hatching sites for green sea turtles, along with the hawksbill and olive ridley turtles. Elasmobranchs are extensive in the park, which are typically fished and sold in markets such as in Kudat.
