= Kandawayon =

Village in Sabah, Malaysia

Kandawayon is a village located at Sikuati, Kudat, Sabah, Malaysia.

Most of the people belong to the Rungus ethnic group. The village is located about 5 km from the Pekan Sikuati and 32 km from Kudat town.

According to the old folk, Kandawayon is named after a group of birds called egret or in Bahasa Rungus, it is called as Kandavai.
