= Banggi Island =

Largest Malaysian island

Banggi/Banguey Island
Native name: Pulau Banggi/Bonggi
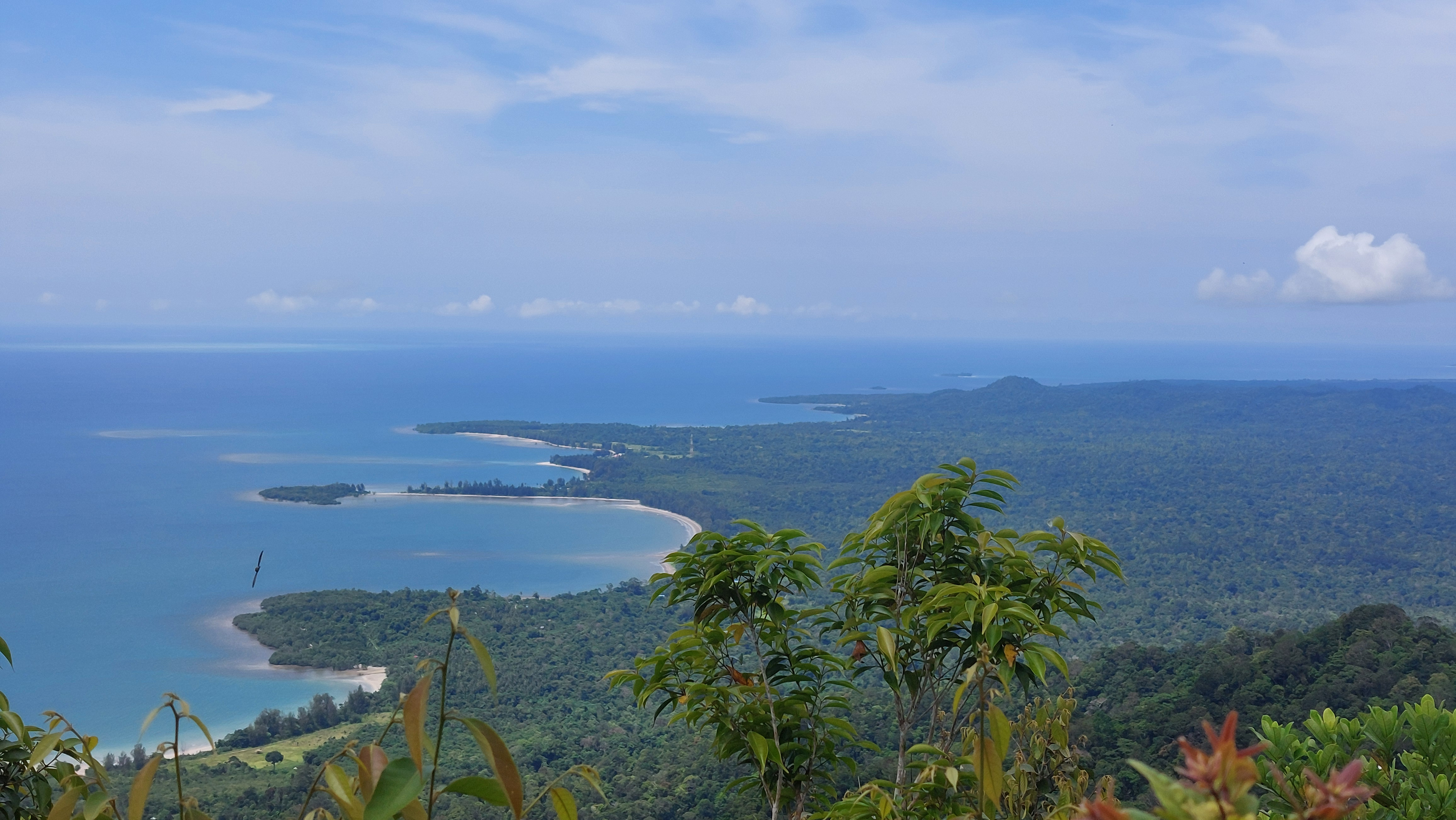
- View from the top of Sibumbung @ Senambung Hill, overlooking the east of the island

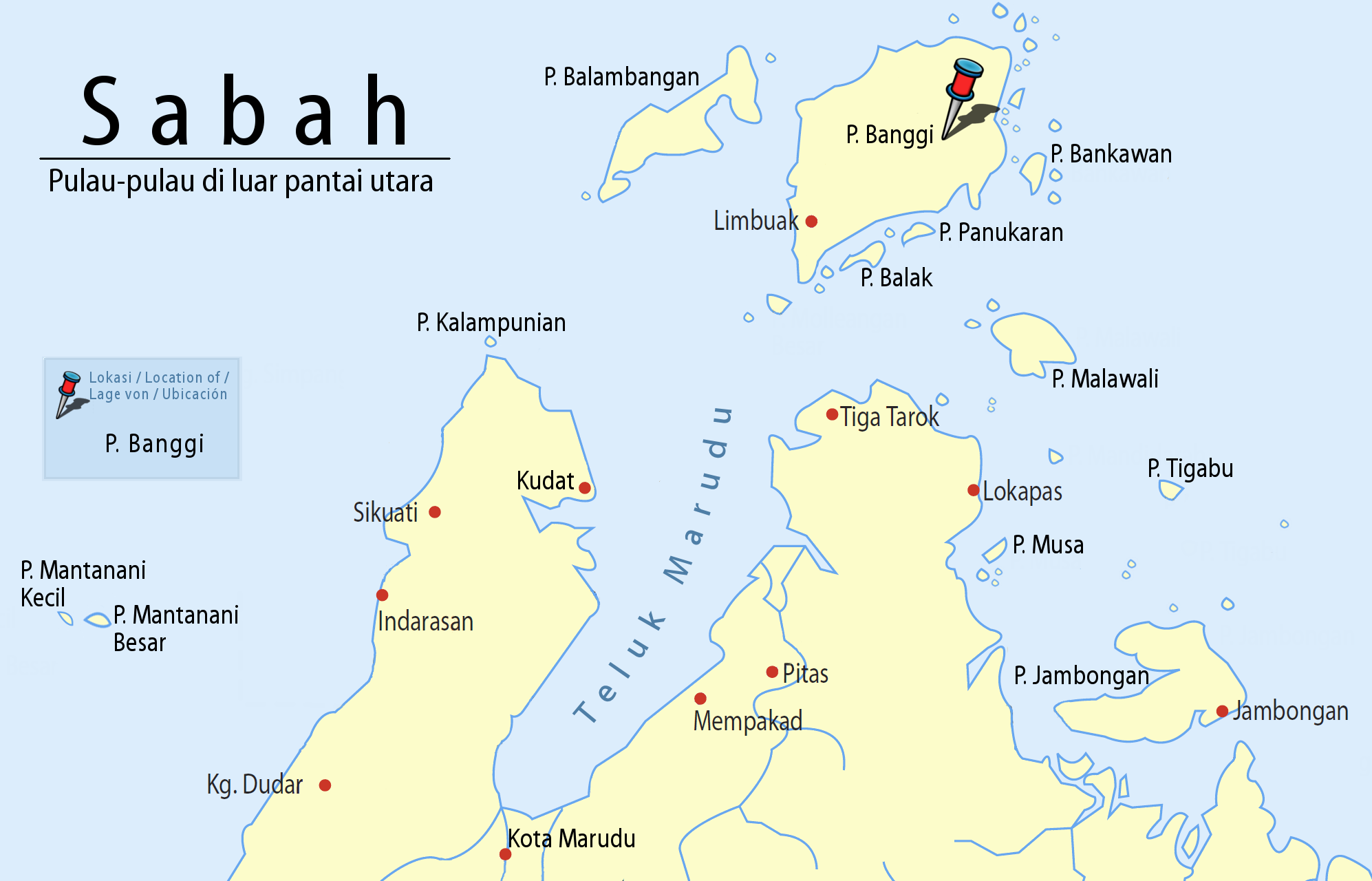
- Location of Banggi Island between South China Sea and Sulu Sea

Geography
- Location: Tun Mustapha Marine Park
- Coordinates: 7°15′0″N 117°10′0″E
- Archipelago: Borneo (Greater Sunda Islands)
- Adjacent to: Balabac Strait
- Area: 440.7 km^{2} (170.2 sq mi)
- Coastline: 121.3 km (75.37 mi)
- Highest elevation: 572 m (1877 ft)
- Highest point: Senambung Hill (572 metres (1,877 ft))

Administration
- Malaysia
- State: Sabah
- Division: Kudat
- District: Kudat

Demographics
- Population: 30,000 (2016)

Additional information
- Official website: PDKBanggi.sabah.gov

Banggi Island or Banguey Island (Malay: Pulau Banggi; Kadazan Dusun: Bonggi) is an island and sub-district located in the Kudat Division of Kudat District, Sabah in Malaysia. With an area of 440.7 square kilometres (170.2 sq mi) separated from the Sabah mainland by the South Banggi Channel, it is the largest island fully in the country followed by Bruit Island of Sarawak, Langkawi Island of Kedah, and Penang Island of Penang. Located off the northern coast of Sabah near Marudu Bay, the highest elevation on the island is the Senambung Hill (Malay: Bukit Senambung) at 572 metres (1,877 ft). As of 2016, the island has an estimated population of 30,000. Limbuak is one of the main settlements on the northern islands, with other settlements including neighbouring island of Balambangan, Dagotan, Kapitangan, Karakit, Laksian, Lok Agong, Loktohog, Malawali, Maliu, Palak, Sabor, Sebogoh, and Tigabu. The nearest neighbouring Philippine island is Mangsee Islands.

== Etymology ==
The origin of the island name of Banggi is borrowed from the local dialect of Bonggi Dusun, which carries the meaning of bangkai (corpse). In the past, visitors on the island would usually find human corpses strung up on trees since the practice of immediately burying the dead was non-existent among the earliest island inhabitants. Based on local folklore, the earliest island inhabitants would usually leave their dead relatives on trees to parch them to the bones, which were then collected for burial. In the modern days, the inhabitants are more used to calling the island "Bonggi". The word "Banggi" is also used among the islander as a curse word as in the phrase of "Banggi nu!" which are translated as drop dead in the English language. During the British administration, the island was referred to as "Banguey".

== History ==
A Vietnamese Đông Sơn drum was once uncovered in Timbang Dayang Hill on the island that was between 2,000 and 2,500 years old, together with the findings of ancient Chinese ceramics around the island and in Kudat, indicating the island's interaction with various Chinese and Vietnamese dynasties. The island was once under the rule of the Sultanate of Brunei, as were much of the areas of northern Borneo before the arrival of European powers. The Bruneian Sultanate used to exact tribute from the coastal people, whilst the interior was free from any thalassocratic control. Around 1704, Brunei ceded the northern part of Borneo from Kimanis northward, including the islands of Palawan, Banggi, and Balambangan, to the Sultanate of Sulu as a reward for their help during the Brunei Civil War.

=== British acquisition ===
In 1759, Alexander Dalrymple, a Scottish geographer, hydrographer, and publisher, was dispatched by the East India Company (EIC) to establish trade relations with the Sulu Sultanate, where he signed a treaty of alliance and commerce with Sultan Bantilan of Sulu in early January 1761.

The following year on 12 September 1762, Sultan Bantilan held the council of the chief people at Sulu, in which the island of Balambangan was granted to the EIC. Within the same year, Dalrymple established a factory at Banggi to process spice obtained from the Bugis working in the Moluccas, although the plan never materialised. Following the British occupation of Manila, Sultan Alimuddin of Sulu, who had been imprisoned in Manila by the Spanish authorities, was freed by the British and allowed to return to his throne, which was welcomed by the Sulu people. The first direct contact between the indigenous islanders of Bonggi Dusun and the English was made on 23 January 1763 when he took the island for the EIC and hoisted the British flag. He returned to Sulu in 1764 to renegotiate the agreement, and a new cession was made by the Sulu Sultanate on 2 July 1764, which gave the EIC exclusive rights on the islands of Balambangan and Banggi. By 1773, the British began establishing a settlement with John Herbert as Chief Resident, accompanied by Captain Thomas Forrest, while Dalrymple was dismissed by the EIC due to some disagreements with the company authority. Herbert, however, cheated the EIC out of large sums of money and quarrelled with local Sulu chiefs, causing the Sulus to regret their deals with the EIC and causing the British garrison to be attacked by the Sulus, with the Balambangan settlement being destroyed by Sulu pirates in March 1775. Due to his conduct, Herbert was dismissed by the EIC later that same year. Most of the British survivors fled to Brunei, and by 6 July 1775, the British returned to Banggi to reclaim the remains left behind by the Sulus.

A British Admiralty Chart in 1870, featuring the island of Banggi's location in the Balabac Strait

In 1803, the EIC dispatched Robert Farquhar to resettle the Balambangan Island although the British withdrew in 1805 due to the inability to defend their post. Further in 1823 and in the 1840s, the British considered resettling both Banggi and Balambangan although the British later establish the Crown Colony of Labuan instead in 1848. In 1865, the Sultan of Borneo leased the island to Charles Lee Moses, the American Consul General of Brunei, and subsequently to the American Trading Company of Borneo, which was later acquired by a German businessman, adventurer, and diplomat, Gustav von Overbeck, and Alfred Dent of the North Borneo Chartered Company (NBCC). In 1877, Sultan Abdul Momin of Brunei granted the territories from the Sulaman River to the Paitan River on the northeast coast to Overbeck and Dent, including the island of Banggi (spelt as Banguey at the time) and all other islands within three marine leagues of the coast (approximately 16 kilometres (9.9 miles) from the shoreline), as well as from the Paitan to the Sibuco River. Following the American Navy's consideration to build a naval depot in Banggi as well as the Kingdom of Italy's attempt to acquire the island from the Sultanate of Brunei in 1870 to establish a penal settlement, the British established the protectorate of North Borneo through the NBCC in 1881. The Germans also began to get involved in commercial activities on the island with the establishment of a tobacco estate at Limbuak Darat in 1884. By 1885, the British surveyed the proposed town of Mitford, which is the English name of Karakit or Kerahid by the Bonggi Dusun.

Since the establishment of North Borneo, the British administered Banggi Island directly from Kudat District with the only administration building on the island having been a police quarters at Mitford established in 1887. In 1903, the Sultanate of Sulu made further confirmation of their cession of all islands near to the territory of North Borneo, from Banggi to as far as the Sibuco Bay. The British began establishing schools in the 1950s to address islander literacy, with further administration infrastructure being established throughout the foundation of the Malaysian federation in 1963.

=== Present history ===
In 2014, a new township was proposed to be built on the island. The island has also been part of the gazetted area of Tun Mustapha Marine Park since 2016. A district office was constructed in the town of Karakit in the 2010s, covering Balambangan Island, Manawali Cape Island, and Tigabu Island. Other public infrastructure including a government rest house, hotel, Royal Malaysia Police station, health clinic, and homestay are operated by the islanders. In 2024, one of the primary schools on the island was chosen as part of the British Council's global English programs together with three other schools from the State of Palestine, Greece, and Cameroon.

== Geography ==
With the island's location in the northernmost part of Sabah, it hosts a variety of biodiversity. There are 10 species of mangrove trees on the island and 239 individuals, including 39 species of mammals with 20 that were reported for the first time in 1995. Animal species such as Tupaia gracilis, Exilisciurus exilis, and Hipposideros dyacorum are present on the island, and its fauna exhibits a characteristic of land-bridge island faunas. The –120 metre bathymetric line in the north of the island divides the fauna of Bornean species with the fauna of Palawan species of the Philippine Islands.

=== Climate ===
Banggi Island has a tropical rainforest climate (Af) characterised by high temperatures with abundant rainfall, as well as high humidity throughout the year. It experiences consistent temperatures, with average highs between 28 °C (82 °F) to 31 °C (88 °F) and lows between 24 °C (75 °F) and 26 °C (79 °F). Rainfall is significant, particularly during the northeast monsoon season (November to March), with an average of 1,654 millimetres (65.1 inches) to 2,500 millimetres (98 inches) annually.

=== Conservation sites ===
The island hosts a number of conservation sites, with the southern tip of the island, known as the Wak-Wak, containing both primary lowland forest and mangrove forest, which is part of the Karakit Forest Reserve. At the southeast part of Banggi Peak, known as Kalangkaman Site, which is part of the Banggi Forest Reserve, are a variety of tree and plant species, including abundant mosses and epiphytes covering the trees at 350 metres (1,150 ft) elevation, and at the summit, most of the trees are widely spaced and dense vegetation of various species of ferns and grasses, pitcher plants, as well as orchids. The eastern part named Sabor covered an area with logged forest, with scattered open grassland as a result of shifting cultivation. The Lok Tohok in the southern part is covered with mixed grasses and old unmanaged coconut plantations with a large remnant of forest trees. The southernmost tip of Karakit hosts a large mangrove forest area.

== Demographics ==
Various ethnicities inhabited the island, with most being from the indigenous group of Bonggi Dusun. The dominant religion practised is Sunni Islam, with the majority of the inhabitants adhering to it, although there were also communities that practice traditional beliefs of animism and folk religions, while cases of Banggi Christians erroneously identified as Muslims, either intentionally or unintentionally, by the federal Muslim-dominated agencies frequently occur when the indigenous apply for identity cards. The Bajaus have strong cultural and traditional beliefs deeply rooted in their society, where they incorporate elements of both Islam and their ancestral practices. Christianity is present among the indigenous, as in other parts of Sabah, while animistic beliefs and various superstitions hold a strong position among the majority of the indigenous Bonggi Dusuns.

=== Ethnic groups and languages ===
The main ethnicities on the island are Bonggi Dusun, Molbog (Balabak), Rungus, Kagayan Bajau, Ubian, Suluk, and several other islander minority including non-indigenous of Indonesians and Filipinos timber workers, as well as non-Sabahans working at the Malaysian Army camp post. The Bonggi differ from other indigenous groups in Sabah since they did not live in villages but scattered family settlements. The main spoken mother tongue is Bonggi, Molbog, Rungus, Bajau/Ubian, and Tausug (Suluk), with the official Malay language understood by most. The main islander ethnic language of Bonggi contains many English loanwords despite minimal contact with English speakers.

=== Religion ===
While Islam is the current dominant religion practised in the island, the islanders primary religion is a blend of traditional animistic beliefs and, for a small percentage, Christianity, specifically the Seventh-day Adventist denomination. Many of indigenous Bonggi Dusuns still practice animism, which involves reverence for spirits and the natural world, and they often resist other religions that were seen as conflicting with the traditional customs.

== Economy ==
The current main economic activity is fishery and farming, with the presence of palm oil, rubber, and coconut plantations, with further potential for ecotourism and aquaculture. During the British North Borneo administration, chromite was discovered by the British in 1909, and drilling was conducted by Borneo Mining Ltd., although there have been no further significant mining activities since.

There have been proposals to make Banggi Island part of the country's digital free trade zone (DFTZ) and subsequently as the "Golden Gateway" to both the Indonesian and Philippine markets, which are also part of the Brunei Darussalam–Indonesia–Malaysia–Philippines East ASEAN Growth Area (BIMP-EAGA). The island has been estimated by the BIMP-EAGA Council to have the potential to produce over 1.5 GWh of annual renewable electricity through the conversion of palm oil mill effluent and other biomass by-products into biogas, which further could reduce its overdependence on diesel-based electricity generation. As of 2023, the island operates the SSH Pulau Banggi, solar hybrid off-grid electric station.

== Transportation ==
The primary mode of transportation to the island is by ferry from the town of Kudat which depart twice daily, and the journey takes approximately 1.5–2 hours. Within the island, local transport include chartered boats and some local vehicles like motorcycles or potentially four-wheel drive vehicles. The operation of small water vessels within the island waters is subject to regulation under the State Ports and Harbours Enactment 2002.

== See also ==
- List of islands of Malaysia
