= Tigabu Island =

Island in Malaysia

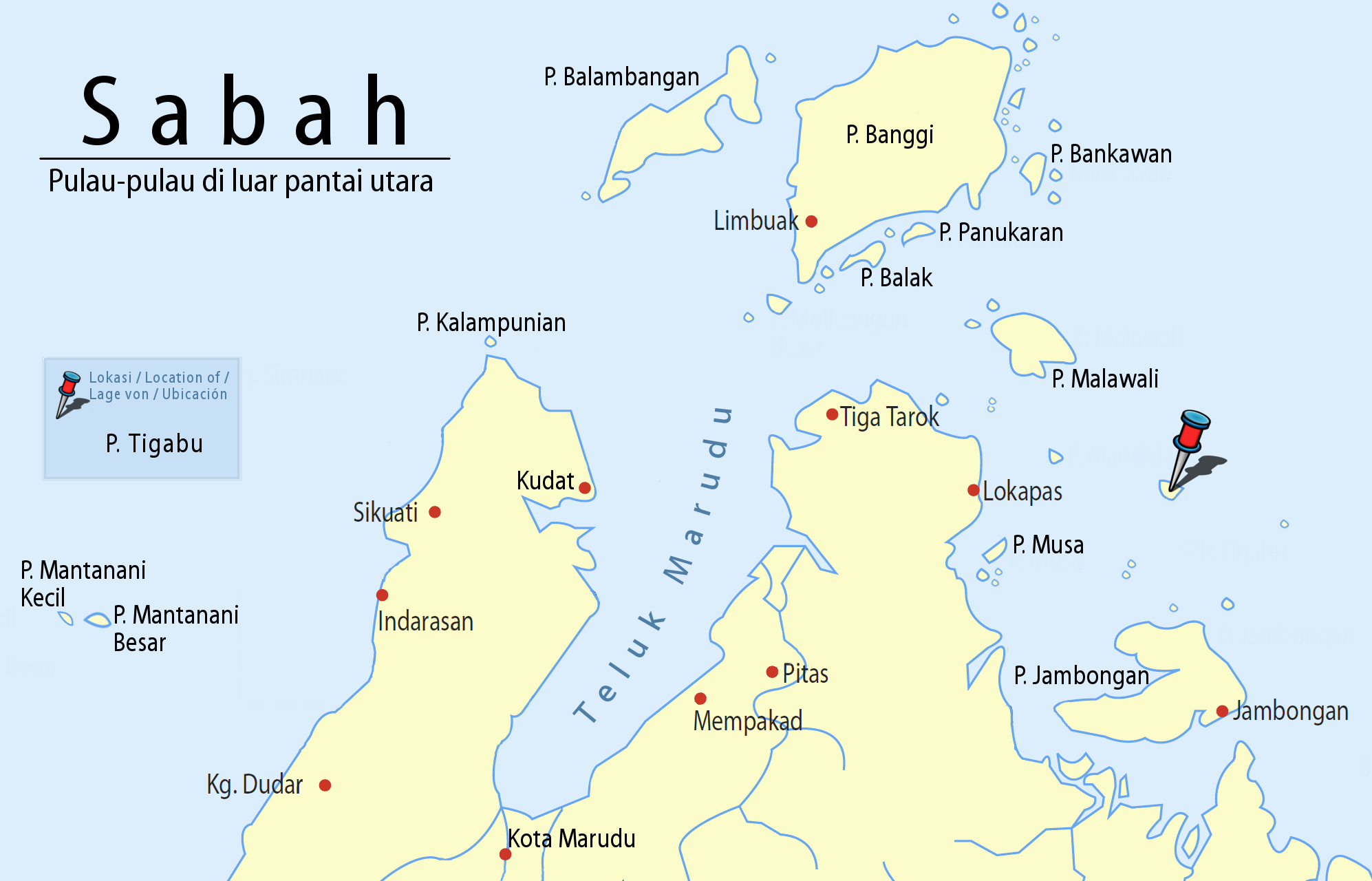
- Location of Tigabu Island in Sulu Sea
- Interactive map of Tigabu Island

Geography
- Coordinates: 6°53′19″N 117°28′29″E

Administration
- Malaysia
- State: Sabah
- Division: Kudat
- District: Kudat

Tigabu Island (Malay: Pulau Tigabu) is a Malaysian island located in the Sulu Sea on the state of Sabah.

== See also ==
- List of islands of Malaysia
