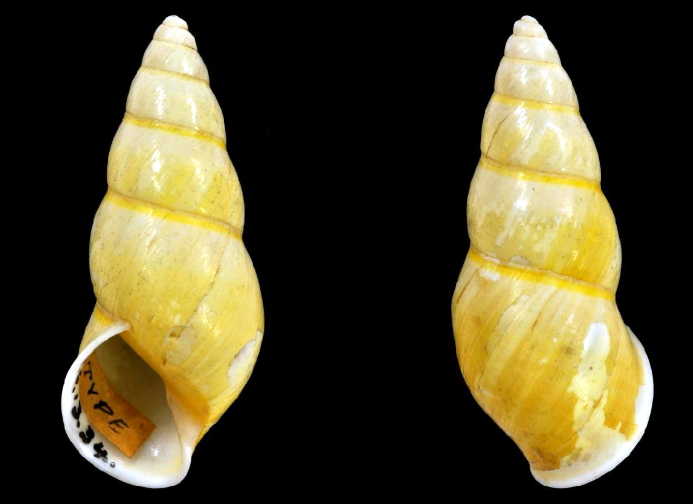
- Shell of Amphidromus aureocinctus (lectotype at the Natural History Museum, London)

Scientific classification
- Kingdom: Animalia
- Phylum: Mollusca
- Class: Gastropoda
- Order: Stylommatophora
- Family: Camaenidae
- Genus: Amphidromus
- Species: A. aureocinctus

Binomial name
- Amphidromus aureocinctus Fulton, 1896

Synonyms
- Amphidromus adamsii var. aureocincta Fulton, 1896 superseded rank (basionym)

= Amphidromus aureocinctus =

Species of gastropod

Amphidromus aureocinctus is a species of air-breathing land snail, a terrestrial pulmonate gastropod mollusc in the family Camaenidae.

== Description ==
The length of the shell attains 41 mm, its diameter 16 mm.

(Original description) Previously considered a variety of Amphidromus adamsii, but it exhibits significant variation in size and form. The upper whorls are a dull white, transitioning to a yellowish-fawn color on the lower whorls. A narrow, golden-yellow band encircles the shell just below the suture. The lip and columella are white.

== Distribution ==
The type species was found in northern Borneo
