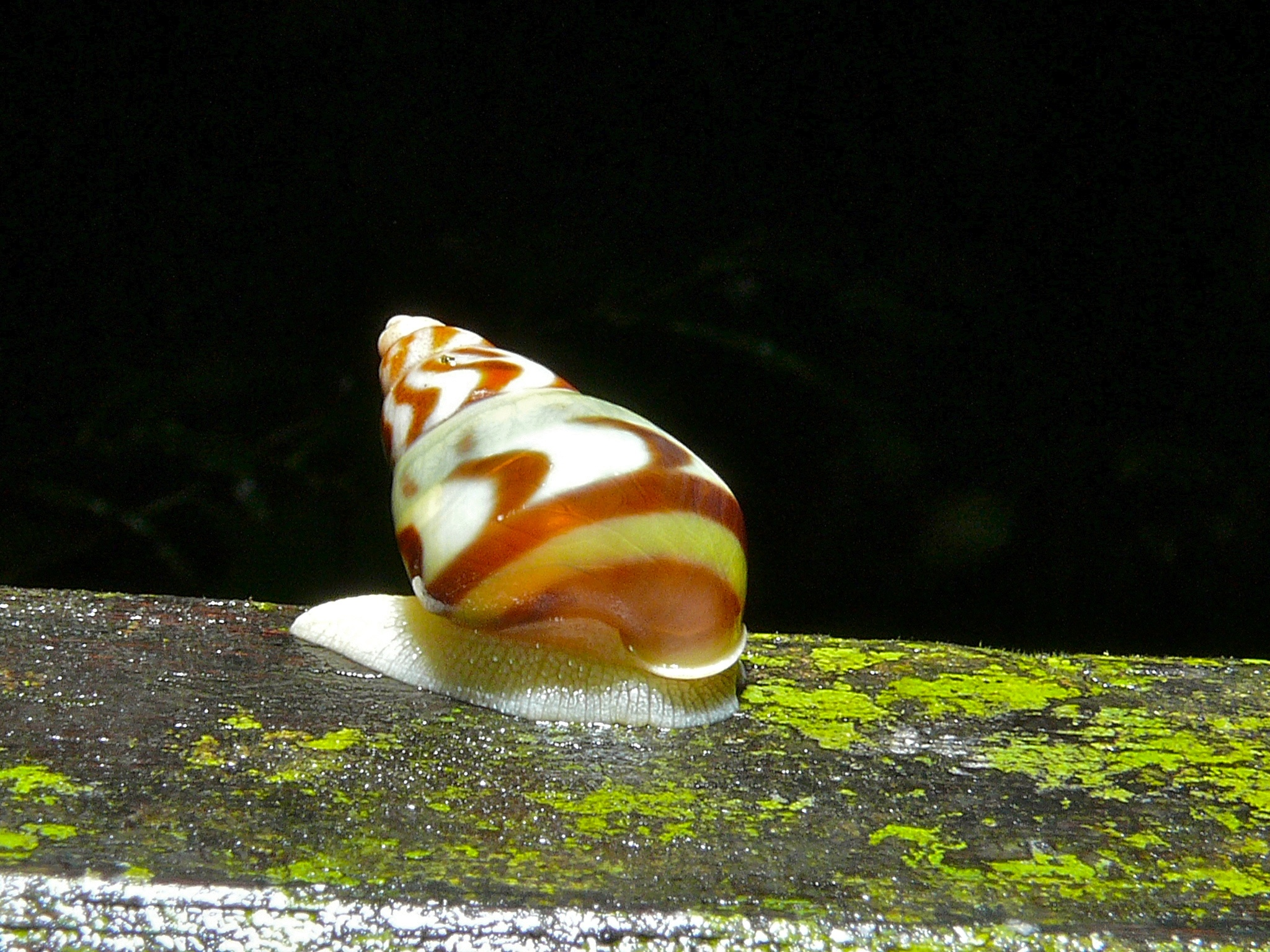
- A live Amphidromus adamsii

Scientific classification
- Kingdom: Animalia
- Phylum: Mollusca
- Class: Gastropoda
- Order: Stylommatophora
- Family: Camaenidae
- Genus: Amphidromus
- Species: A. adamsii

Binomial name
- Amphidromus adamsii (Reeve, 1848)

Synonyms
- Amphidromus adamsi (Reeve, 1848) (misspelling of species name); Bulimus adamsii Reeve, 1848 (original combination)

= Amphidromus adamsii =

Species of gastropod

Amphidromus adamsii is a species of air-breathing land snail, a terrestrial pulmonate gastropod mollusc in the family Camaenidae.

Subspecies

- Amphidromus adamsii adamsii (Reeve, 1848)
- Amphidromus adamsii articulatus Fulton, 1896 (type locality: Banggi Island, Sabah, Malaysia).
- Amphidromus adamsii duplocinctus Fulton, 1896 (type locality: Banggi Island, Sabah, Malaysia).
- Amphidromus adamsii inornatus Fulton, 1896 (type locality: North Borneo)
- Amphidromus adamsii luteofasciatus Fulton, 1896 (type locality: Banggi Island, Sabah, Malaysia).
- Amphidromus adamsii ornatus Fulton, 1896 (type locality: Banggi Island, Sabah, Malaysia).
- Amphidromus adamsii rubiginosus Fulton, 1896 (type locality: North Borneo)

The shell is imperforate or nearly so, oblong-conic, and rather solid, exhibiting striatulations but hardly any spiral striations. Its color is dead-leaf brown, streaked with darker shades, fading to whitish on the upper part of the last whorl and on the spire. It sometimes features irregularly bent brown stripe markings on the spire and some spots at the periphery, with the suture appearing plain or with a reddish-brown line near it below. The apex is white, sometimes bearing a dark dot. The lip and columella are white, the latter being surrounded by an obscure or blackish area. Comprising six and a half whorls.

- Amphidromus adamsii rufocinctus Fulton, 1896 (type locality: Borneo)
- Amphidromus adamsii simplex Fulton, 1896 (type locality: Banggi Island, Sabah, Malaysia).
- Amphidromus adamsii subunicolor Fulton, 1896 (type locality: Banggi Island, Sabah, Malaysia).
- Amphidromus adamsii superbus Fulton, 1896 (type locality: Banggi Island, Sabah, Malaysia).

The variety Amphidromus adamsii var. obliquatus E. von Martens, 1903 is a taxon inquirendum,(use in recent literature currently undocumented)

== Description ==
The length of the shell attains 30 mm, its diameter 16.8 mm.

This shell is characterized by a pale yellow coloration, with the base of the columellar lip displaying a violet hue. A series of oval spots in the same violet color spirals around the convex surface of the body whorl and continues between the spire's whorls, reaching the apex.

The shell is sinistral (reversed), and the pattern of markings is highly variable among individuals. Some specimens are densely covered with spots, while others are entirely a pale straw color.

== Distribution ==
The type species was found in Borneo.
