= Balabac Strait =

Strait between Philippines and Malaysia

- Kipot ng Balabac (Filipino); Selat Balabak (Malay)
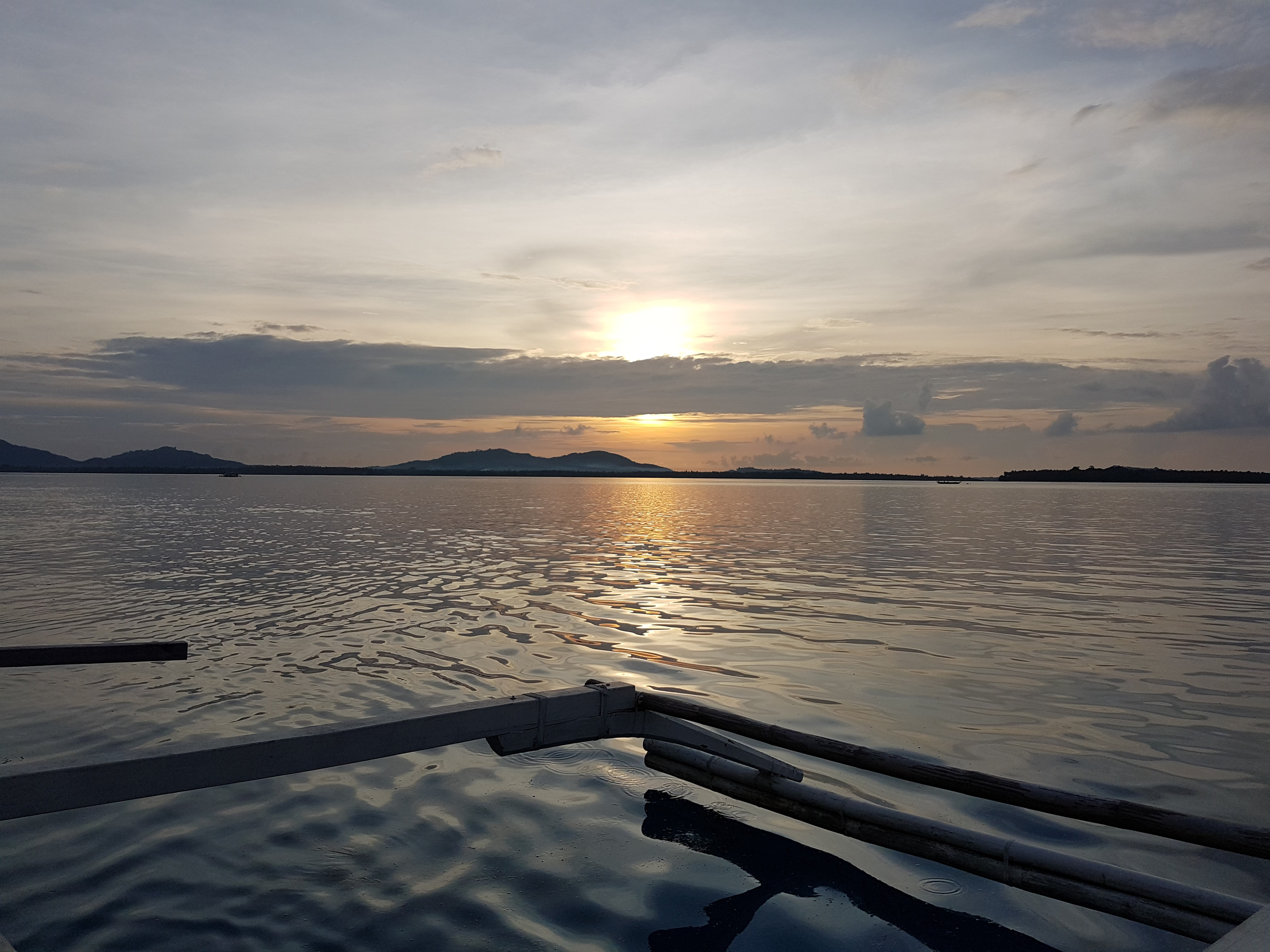
- Balabac Strait sunset on Winter Solstice

- Location within the Philippines and Malaysia
- Location: Palawan, Philippines; Sabah, Malaysia
- Coordinates: 7°40′N 117°00′E
- Type: Strait

The Balabac Strait is one of the straits that connects the South China Sea with the Sulu Sea. It separates Balabac Island (Palawan province), Philippines, from Balambangan and the Banggi Islands north of Borneo that are a part of Malaysia's Sabah state.

== Description ==
The strait is about 50 kilometres (31 mi) wide with a maximum depth of around 100 metres (330 ft). It was therefore likely to have been below sea level before the last ice age and archaelogica; records indicate that there was an exchange of flora and fauna such as the Bornean tiger between Borneo and the Palawans.

== Foreign relations ==
In 2021, Chinese vessels passed through the strait without prior notice. In the same way, American submarines refused to surface. Because of this, the Philippine Senate Committee on Foreign Relations drafted a bill to define the maritime zones of the Philippines. On June 19, 2024, four People's Liberation Army Navy vessels passed through the strait, with two vessels heading southwest at 1:49 p.m., while two other vessels headed the same direction at 3:56 p.m. The incident gained controversy online. The incident, with another near El Nido, caused fear amongst citizens.

== See also ==
- Malaysia–Philippines border – the border between the two countries.
- Mindoro Strait – another strait connecting the South China Sea with the Sulu Sea.
