= Kudat =

- Town and district capital
- Pekan Kudat; Kudat Town

Other transcription(s)
  - Jawi: کودات
  - Chinese: 古达 (Simplified) 古達 (Traditional); Gǔdá (Hanyu Pinyin)
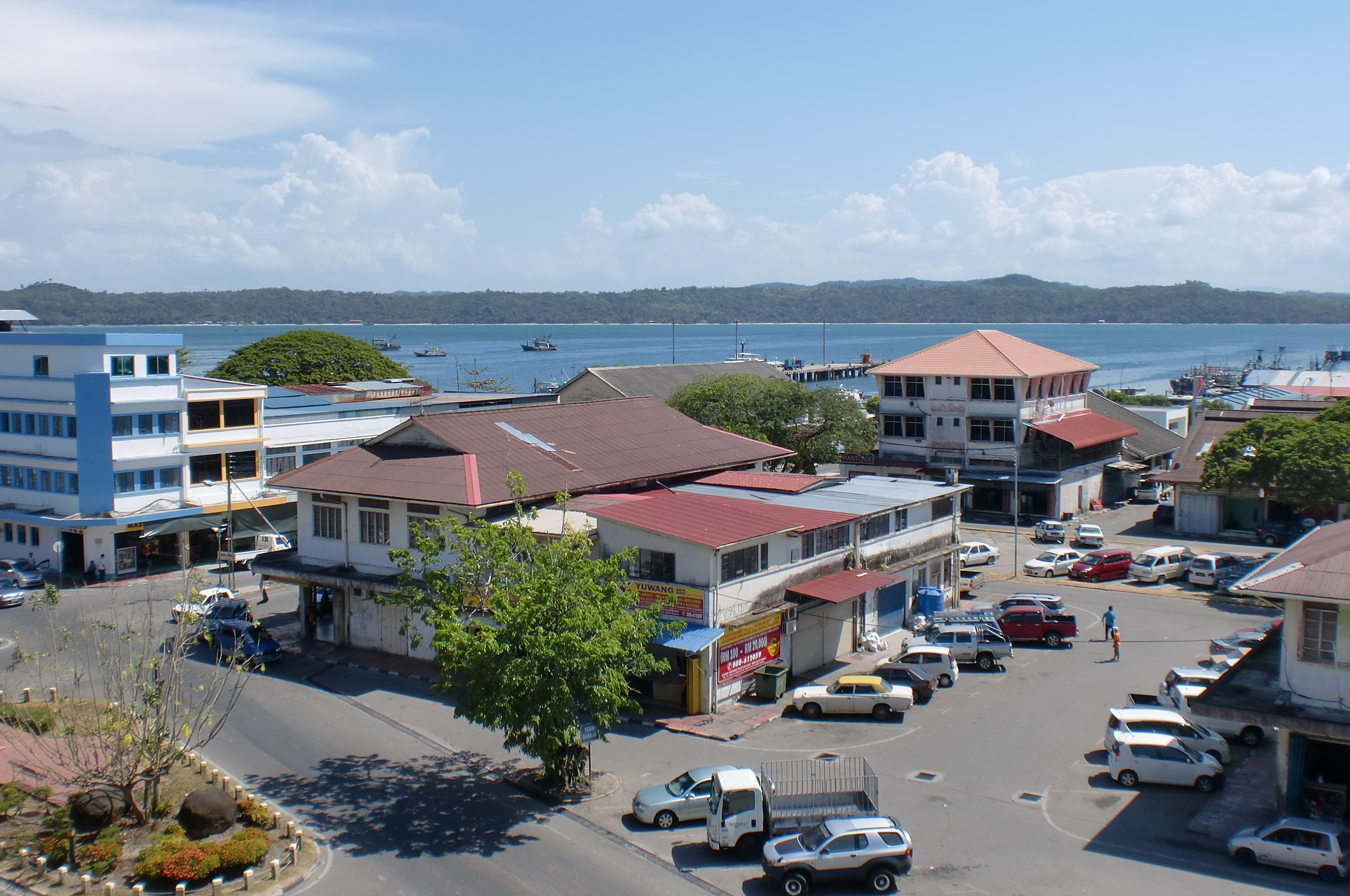
- Kudat town centre.

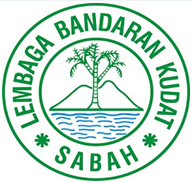
- Seal

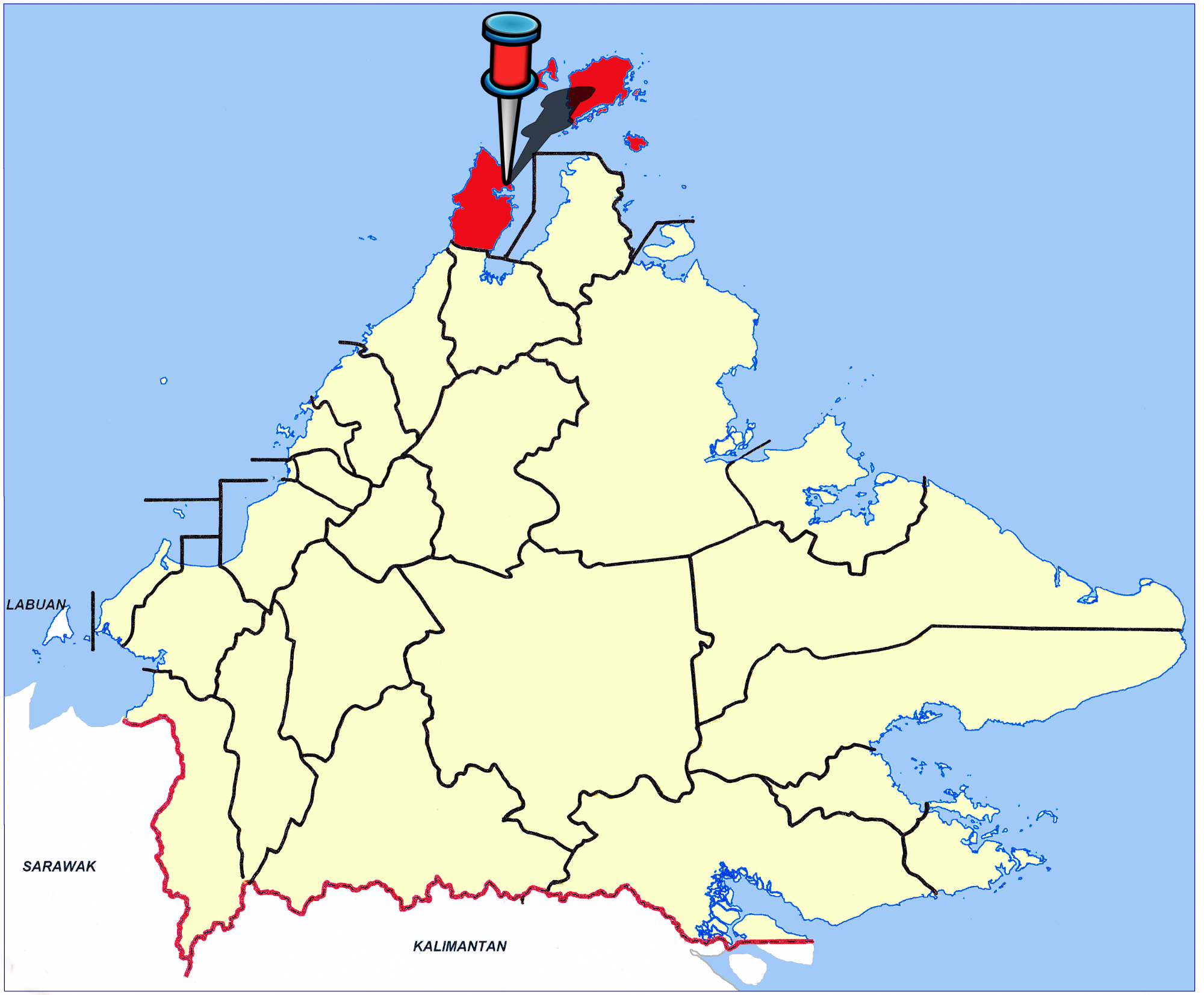

- Location within Malaysia
- Coordinates: 6°53′00″N 116°50′00″E
- Country: Malaysia
- State: Sabah
- Division: Kudat
- District: Kudat

Government
  - Body: Kudat Town Board
  - District Officer: Sapdin Ibrahim

Area
  - Total: 1,287 km^{2} (497 sq mi)

Population (2010)
  - Total: 29,025
- Postcode: 89050
- Vehicle registration: SK
- Website: www.sabah.gov.my/pd.kdt www.sabah.gov.my/lbk/

Kudat (Malay: Pekan Kudat) is the capital of the Kudat District in the Kudat Division of Sabah, Malaysia. Its population was estimated to be around 29,025 in 2010. It is located on the Kudat Peninsula, about 190 kilometres (120 mi) north of Kota Kinabalu, the state capital, and is near the northernmost point of Borneo. It is the largest town in the heartland of the Rungus people which is a sub-ethnic group of the majority Kadazan-Dusun race and is therefore a major centre of Rungus culture. It is also notable for being one of the first parts of Sabah to be settled by Chinese Malaysians, particularly from the Hakka dialect group. It is the northernmost Malaysian city.

== Etymology ==
What is now the Kudat area was originally named 'Tomborungan' by the local Rungus natives. It was named after the Tomborungus River, which has since disappeared. According to local lore, when the early British settlers asked for the name of the place, the local Rungus people misunderstood them and thought that they were asking for the name of a species of coarse grass which grows in abundance in the area. The grass is known as kutad in the Rungus dialect. This was eventually corrupted to 'Kudat' and replaced the old name of 'Tomborungan'.

== History ==
=== Founding of Kudat town ===
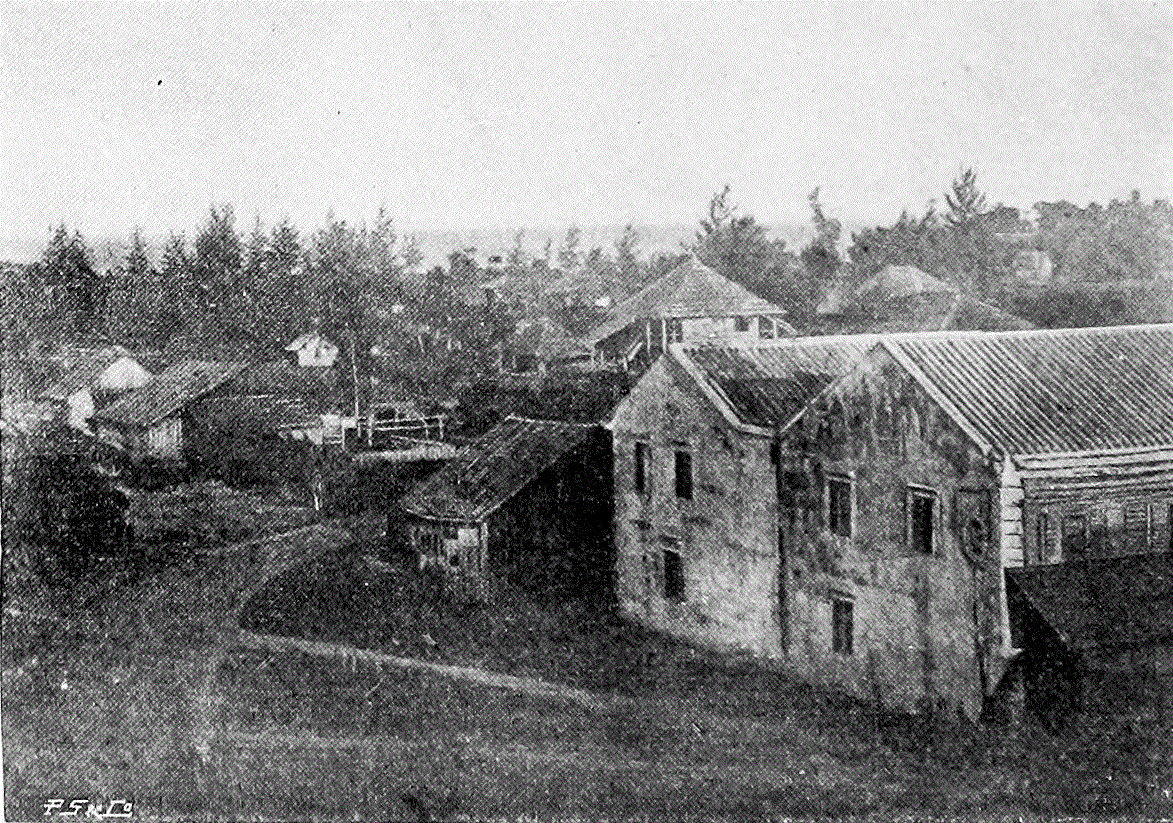
View of Kudat town, 1890

The original inhabitants of Kudat are the native Rungus people, a sub-group of the Dusun people, who traditionally lived inland in longhouse communities to stay beyond the reach of the pirates who frequented the coastline.

In the late 19th century, Franz Witti, an explorer in the employ of the British North Borneo Chartered Company, discovered oil 26 km outside the present-day Kudat town. This may have been a reason why the Company chose Kudat as the site for their first settlement in British North Borneo. The town of Kudat was officially founded on 7 December 1881. Company officers began clearing the land with the aid of several Brunei Malays in preparation for the declaration of Kudat as the first capital of British North Borneo. This was eventually made official in 1882. The British settlers ensured that they would live in peace with their native neighbours by signing a peace agreement with Temenggung Kurantud (then Chieftain of the Rungus people) and Datu Harun (then leader of the Muslim community of Kudat).

British colonial officers in Kudat were quick to ensure that their recreational needs were satisfied by creating the Kudat Golf Club, which is the first golf club in Sabah. The original nine-hole, 3075m course was completed in the early 1900s. It is recognised as a challenging course due to the close proximity of roads and buildings around it.

=== Importation of Chinese labourers ===
The Company's next step was to bring in Chinese migrants to work the land. It resorted to bringing in foreign workers for the purpose because it felt that "the productive and industrial value of the alien races is... far greater than that of the natives of Borneo... it will be a very long time before the natives become, individually, as valuable assets to the State as the alien races". In 1882, the then Governor of North Borneo, William Crocker, requested the help of Walter Medhurst, who had just been appointed as immigration commissioner in China, to send Chinese migrants to British North Borneo. Medhurst offered free passage to British North Borneo to any Chinese people interested in seeking employment there. Most of these migrants disembarked and settled in Kudat and Sandakan, which were then the largest towns in the colony. By the time Medhurst returned to the United Kingdom in 1885, 348 of the 937 residents of Kudat were Chinese. Of these, 222 worked as shopkeepers. During this time, Kudat's significance had waned significantly as the Company moved the capital of British North Borneo to Sandakan. However, Chinese migration to Kudat continued, albeit at a slower pace.

=== World War II ===
During World War II, the Japanese Imperial Army built and maintained an airfield in Kudat with the help of locals and forced labour from Java, Indonesia. The runway was built using coral stones as a base. Many of the Indonesian labourers died from disease and hunger. In 1945, the United States Far East Air Force repeatedly bombed the airfield with its B-25 bombers, putting it out of action. The current Kudat Airport is built on part of the Japanese-built airfield.

=== Post-war ===
After World War II, Kudat received little attention from the rest of British North Borneo, having long been eclipsed by the rapid growth of Sandakan and Kota Kinabalu (then known as Jesselton). Further exacerbating Kudat's isolation was that it was only accessible by sea until a road was built in the 1960s linking Kudat with Kota Kinabalu. Locals concentrated largely on the coconut and seafood industries until the 1990s, when small numbers of visitors began coming to Kudat to experience traditional Rungus culture.

In the early 2000s, Kudat underwent a period of rapid development. A raft of projects gave Kudat several new hotels, a sports centre, the Sidek Esplanade and a new road linking the town with the Pan-Borneo Highway. Additionally, the existing nine-hole course at the Kudat Golf Club was extended to a full 18 holes over 6080m. Today, the old nine-hole course is known as the 'second nines' while the newer nine-hole course is referred to as the 'first nines'.

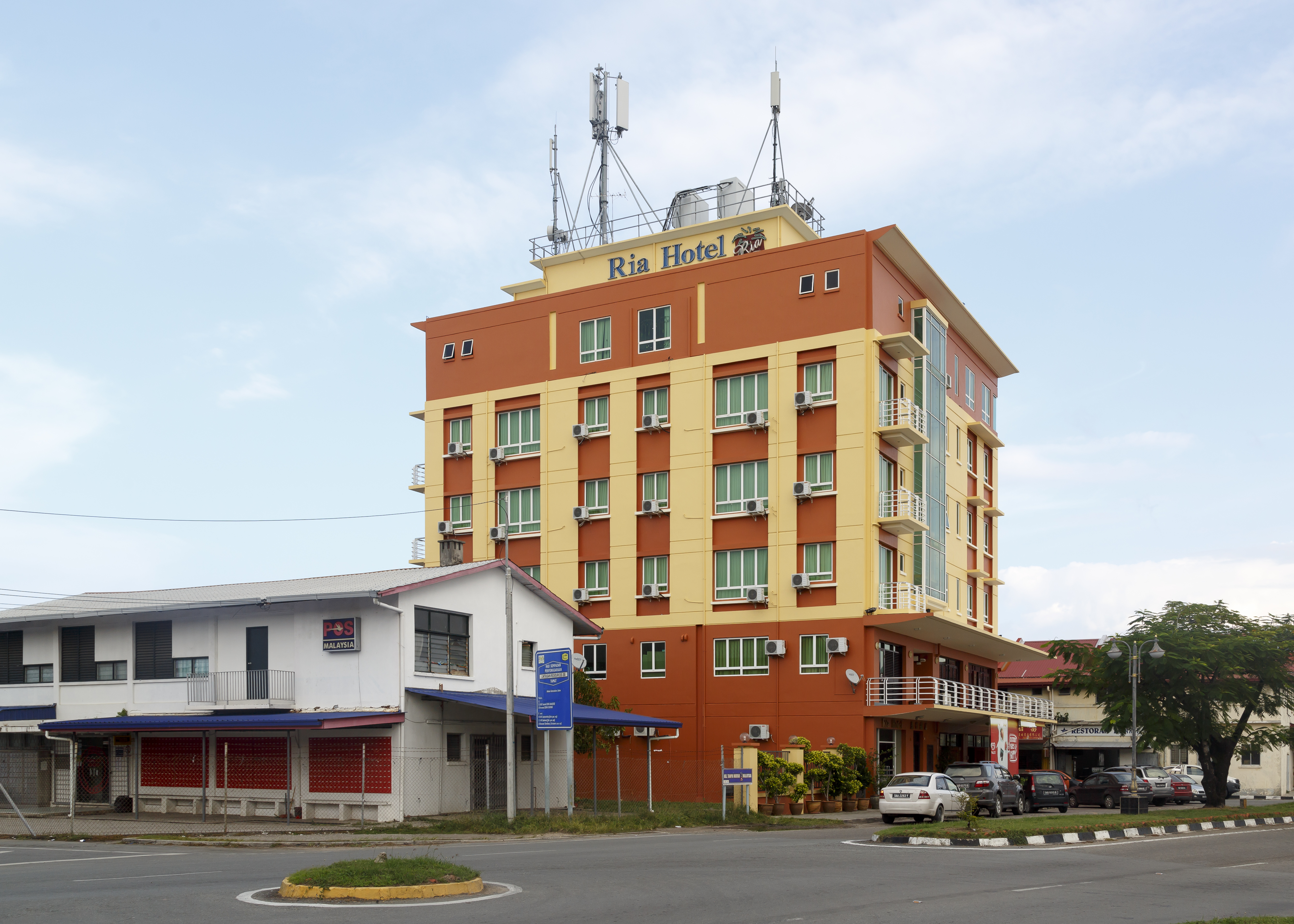
The Ria Hotel

== Culture ==
=== Hakka Chinese community ===
Kudat is home to a significant Hakka Chinese minority which is among the oldest Hakka communities in Sabah. Hakka involvement in Kudat began in the 1880s with Walter Medhurst's offer of free passage to British North Borneo to prospective migrants in southern China.

The Basel Missionary Society in China was extremely supportive of this initiative, particularly a missionary named Rudolph Lechler who has been described as the 'godfather of Christian Hakka emigration'. He actively encouraged Christian Hakkas living in Guangdong province to take up Medhurst's offer. The first group of migrants to Kudat arrived in 1883 and founded the settlement of Lau San (Chinese: 老山; Pinyin: Lǎo Shān; literally 'Old Mountain'). In 1889, a new batch of settlers established themselves in the new settlement of Sin San (Chinese: 新山; Pinyin: Xīn Shān; literally 'New Mountain'). Later arrivals created new settlements further away from Kudat town. These include the villages of Pinangsoo (Traditional Chinese: 槟榔樹; Hakka: 'Bin long soo'; Pinyin: Bīnláng shù; literally 'Betel nut tree'), Tamalang and Sikuati (Chinese: 西瓜地; Pinyin: Xīguā dì). While the pioneer settlers were mostly Hakkas, some of the later arrivals were from the Hokkien, Cantonese and Hainanese dialect groups.

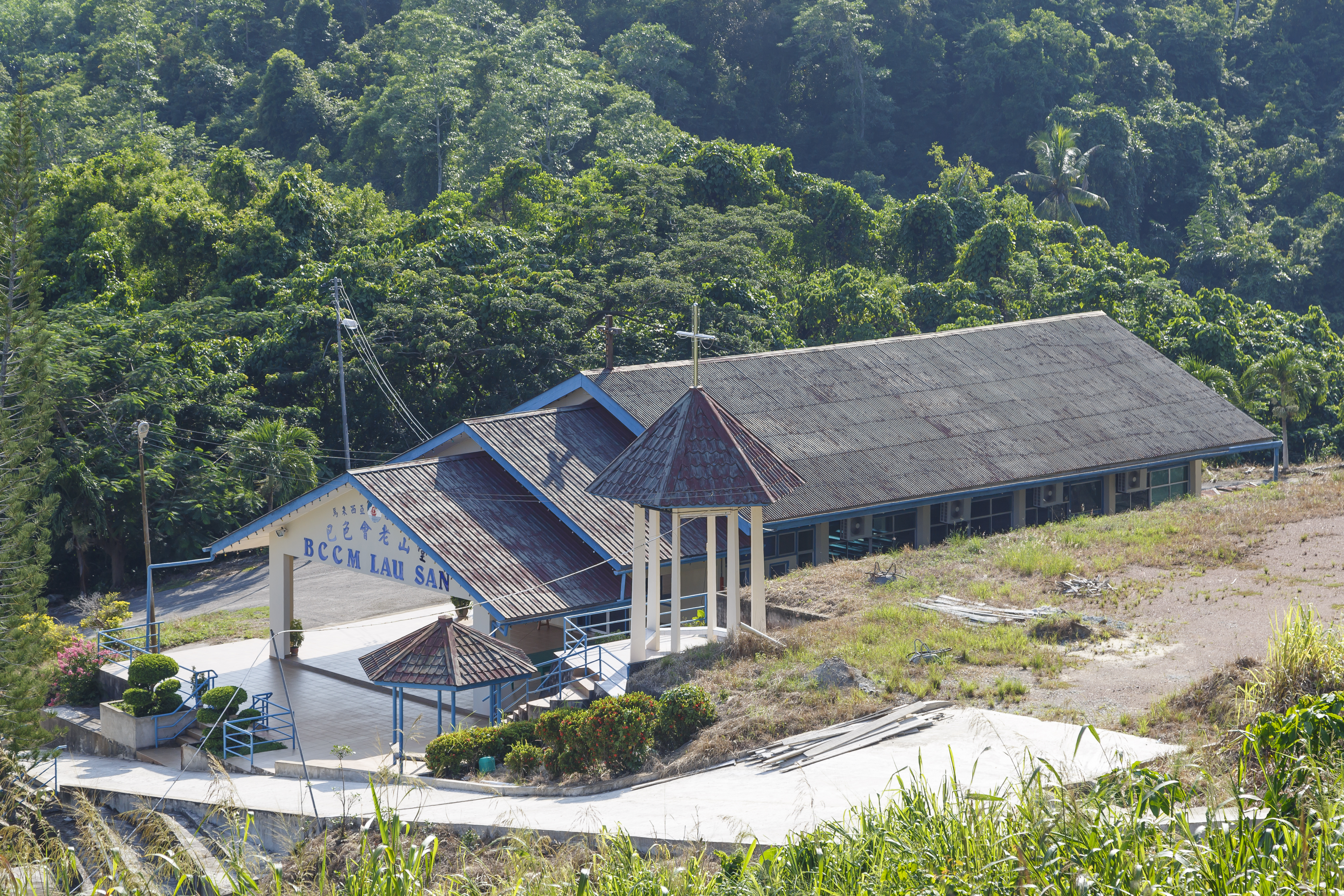
The Basel Christian Church at Lau San dates back to the late 19th century

The Company offered these early Hakka settlers free land and tools, as well as food rations for their first six months. In return, the settlers were required to clear the forests in their 10-acre plots of land, and to cultivate at least half of each plot with rice. The other half could be used for subsistence crops. Many of the Hakka settlers established vast coconut plantations, which remain the dominant feature of much of Kudat's landscape. At present, the total area under coconut cultivation in Kudat district is approximately 5,740 hectares; more than 3,000 families are involved in managing these coconut plantations. The Hakkas remain an integral part of Kudat's society. Most of the shops in downtown Kudat, as well as in smaller towns throughout the district such as Sikuati and Mattunggong, are owned by Hakkas. Many place names in the district have their origins in the Hakka language, such as Lau San, Sin San, Pinangsoo and Pakka Choon (Chinese: 百家村; Pinyin: Bǎijiā cūn; literally 'Village of one hundred families'). The same is true of several roads in the district, such as Jalan Sak Fu and Jalan Tai Cheong. Additionally, several roads in downtown Kudat are named after local Hakkas who were prominent members of the community, including Jalan Wan Siak (named after Leong Wan Siak; Traditional Chinese: 梁萬錫; Pinyin: Liáng Wànxī), Jalan Chin Sham Choi (Traditional Chinese: 陳三才; Pinyin: Chén Sāncái) and Jalan Lo Thien Chok (Traditional Chinese: 羅天爵; Pinyin: Luó Tiānjué).

== Tourism ==
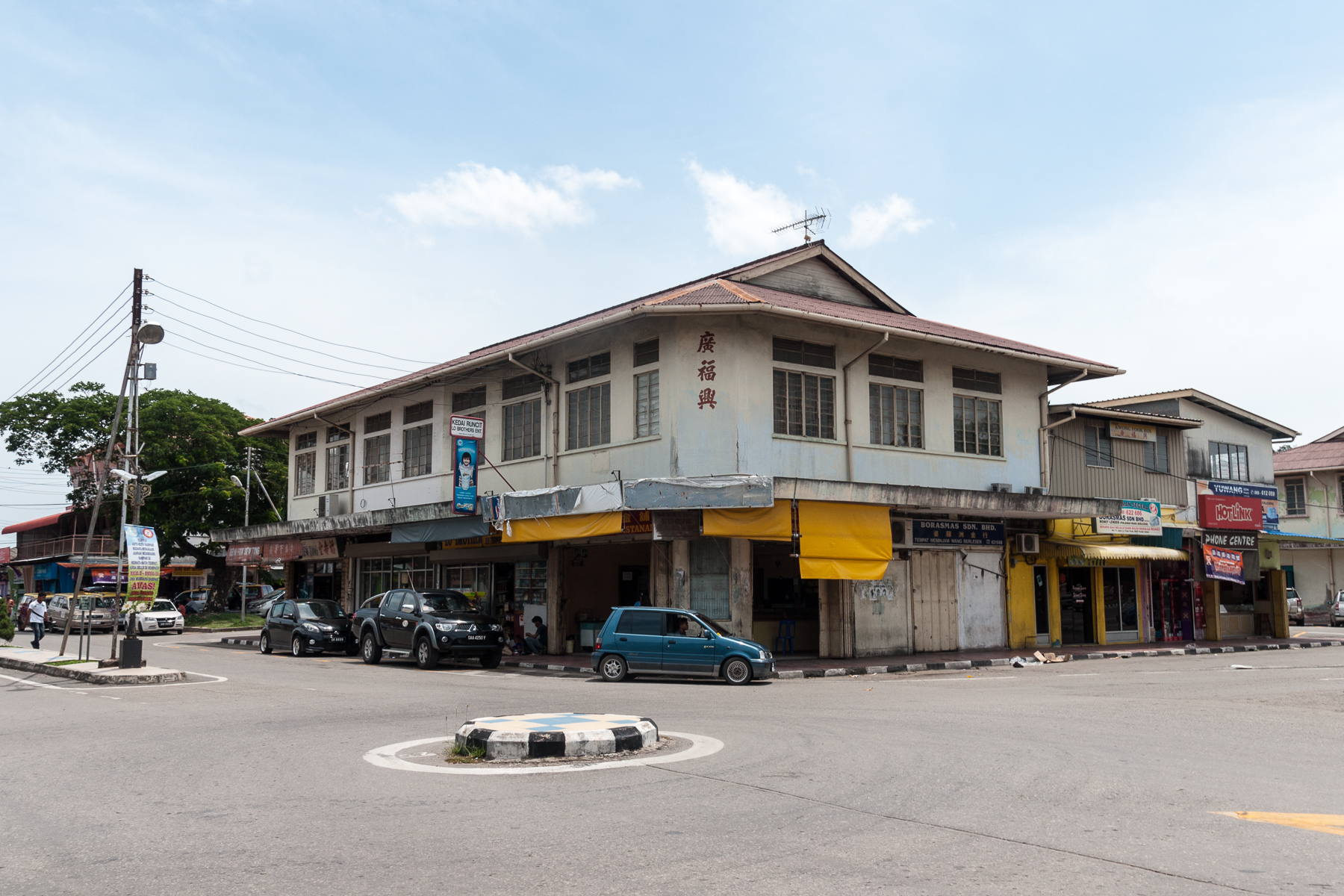
Hakka Chinese-operated shops in downtown Kudat

=== Kudat town ===
The small but important tourism industry in Kudat town revolves largely around its laid back atmosphere and its proximity to the sea. Visitors from throughout Sabah come to Kudat to purchase its fresh seafood and to experience the charms of a typical Sabahan country town. Tourist attractions located in the town proper include the Kudat Golf Club, Sidek Esplanade, central market and fish market.

=== Coastal features ===
Kudat is famous for its beaches, which are among the most unspoilt in Sabah. Some of the better-known beaches include Bak Bak, Pasir Putih, Kalampunian and Torungkungan. Kudat is also notable for its proximity to Tanjung Simpang Mengayau, a headland which forms the northernmost point of the island of Borneo.

=== Rungus culture ===
Several villages along the Kota Kinabalu – Kudat road each showcase one particular aspect of Rungus culture. In Kampung Gombizau (Gombizau village), visitors can observe the production of honey and gathering of traditional Rungus herbs, whereas Kampung Sumangkap is famous for its gong-making industry. Kampung Bavanggazo on the other hand is noted for its traditional Rungus longhouses, which are part of a community project offering tourists the chance to experience and learn about the culture and lifestyle of the Rungus people. Rungus culture can also be experienced at the Misompuru Homestay Programme, which is centred around Kampung Minyak.

== Transport ==
=== Land ===
Kudat is the northern terminus of the Pan-Borneo Highway. The section of the highway between Kudat in the north and the Sabah-Sarawak border in the south is known as Federal Route 1 (Sabah); beyond the border, the highway continues as Federal Route 1 (Sarawak). The former section links Kudat with Kota Kinabalu and other major towns on Sabah's west coast, including Kota Belud, Tuaran, Papar, Beaufort and Sipitang. The 190 km journey from Kudat to Kota Kinabalu takes approximately three hours by car.

Sadly the road has not been maintained properly by the relevant authority and has caused many unfortunate accidents and is constantly being used by politician to increase the number of voters.

=== Air ===
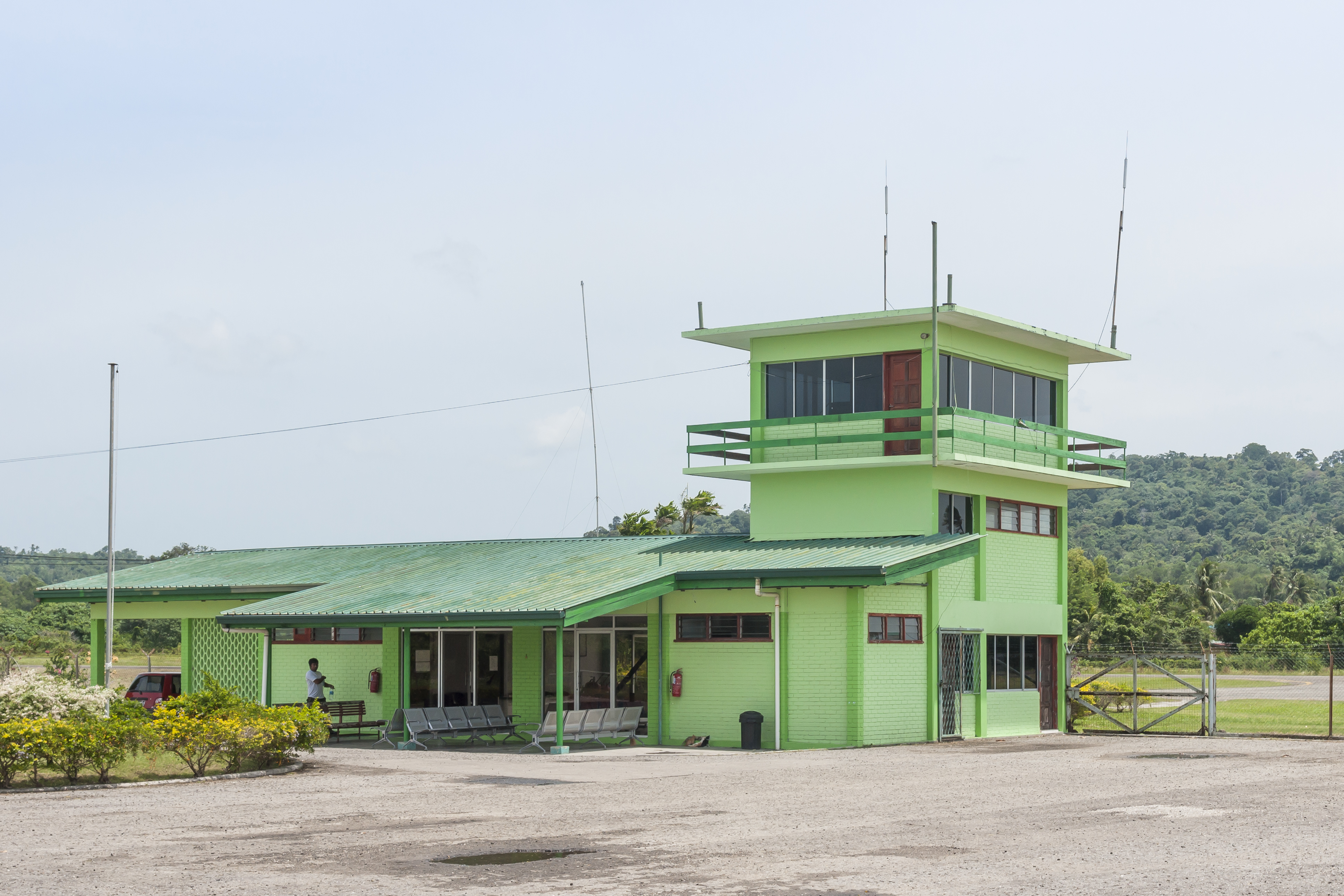
Kudat Airport

North of the town centre is Kudat Airport, from which there are flights to Kota Kinabalu and Sandakan operated by MASWings. Flights to Kota Kinabalu take 40 minutes while flights to Sandakan are 50 minutes long.

=== Sea ===
In February 2015, the Minister of Special Tasks in the Sabah Chief Minister's Department, Teo Chee Kang, announced plans for a roll-on-roll-off (RORO) ferry service between Kudat and Brooke's Point in Palawan, the Philippines. To allow passengers to enter and exit Malaysia on this forthcoming ferry service, a Customs, Immigration, Quarantine and Security (CIQS) Centre has been constructed and other necessary facilities are currently being built.

The ferry service was originally scheduled to begin in June 2016. However, in April 2016, the then-Sabahan Chief Minister Musa Aman announced that the commencement of the ferry service would be suspended indefinitely. This was done as a security measure in the wake of the kidnapping of four Malaysians in the waters off Semporna by Abu Sayyaf militants from the Philippines.

== Climate ==
Kudat has a tropical rainforest climate (Af) with moderate to heavy rainfall from February to November and heavy rainfall in December and January.

Climate data for Kudat
Month	Jan	Feb	Mar	Apr	May	Jun	Jul	Aug	Sep	Oct	Nov	Dec	Year
Mean daily maximum °C (°F)	29.7 (85.5)	29.8 (85.6)	30.6 (87.1)	31.5 (88.7)	31.9 (89.4)	31.6 (88.9)	31.3 (88.3)	31.3 (88.3)	30.7 (87.3)	30.7 (87.3)	30.4 (86.7)	29.9 (85.8)	30.8 (87.4)
Daily mean °C (°F)	26.2 (79.2)	26.2 (79.2)	26.8 (80.2)	27.5 (81.5)	27.9 (82.2)	27.5 (81.5)	27.2 (81.0)	27.2 (81.0)	26.7 (80.1)	26.9 (80.4)	26.8 (80.2)	26.4 (79.5)	26.9 (80.5)
Mean daily minimum °C (°F)	22.7 (72.9)	22.7 (72.9)	23.1 (73.6)	23.6 (74.5)	23.9 (75.0)	23.5 (74.3)	23.2 (73.8)	23.2 (73.8)	22.8 (73.0)	23.2 (73.8)	23.2 (73.8)	23.0 (73.4)	23.2 (73.7)
Average rainfall mm (inches)	336 (13.2)	173 (6.8)	157 (6.2)	85 (3.3)	124 (4.9)	131 (5.2)	113 (4.4)	119 (4.7)	128 (5.0)	189 (7.4)	271 (10.7)	444 (17.5)	2,270 (89.3)
Source: Climate-Data.org

== Notable people ==
- Fuad Stephens (1920–1976) - The first & fifth Chief Minister of Sabah and the third Governor of Sabah (born in this town but hailed from Papar).
- Mustapha Harun (1918–1995) – First governor of Sabah; co-founder of the United Sabah National Organisation
- Chong Kah Kiat (1947–) – 13th Chief Minister of Sabah; former President of the Liberal Democratic Party; former member of the Sabah State Legislative Assembly for Tanjong Kapor
- Lo Thien Chok – Chinese representative in the British North Borneo Legislative Council, 1914-1926
- Teo Chee Kang (1970–) – Minister of Special Tasks in the Sabah Chief Minister's Department from 2013 to 2018; former President of the Liberal Democratic Party; former member of the Sabah State Legislative Assembly for Tanjong Kapor
- Haji Sidek Danta – Co-founder of the United Sabah National Organisation
