= Kudat Division =

Administrative division in Sabah, Malaysia

Coordinates: 6.8333°N 117.1167°E

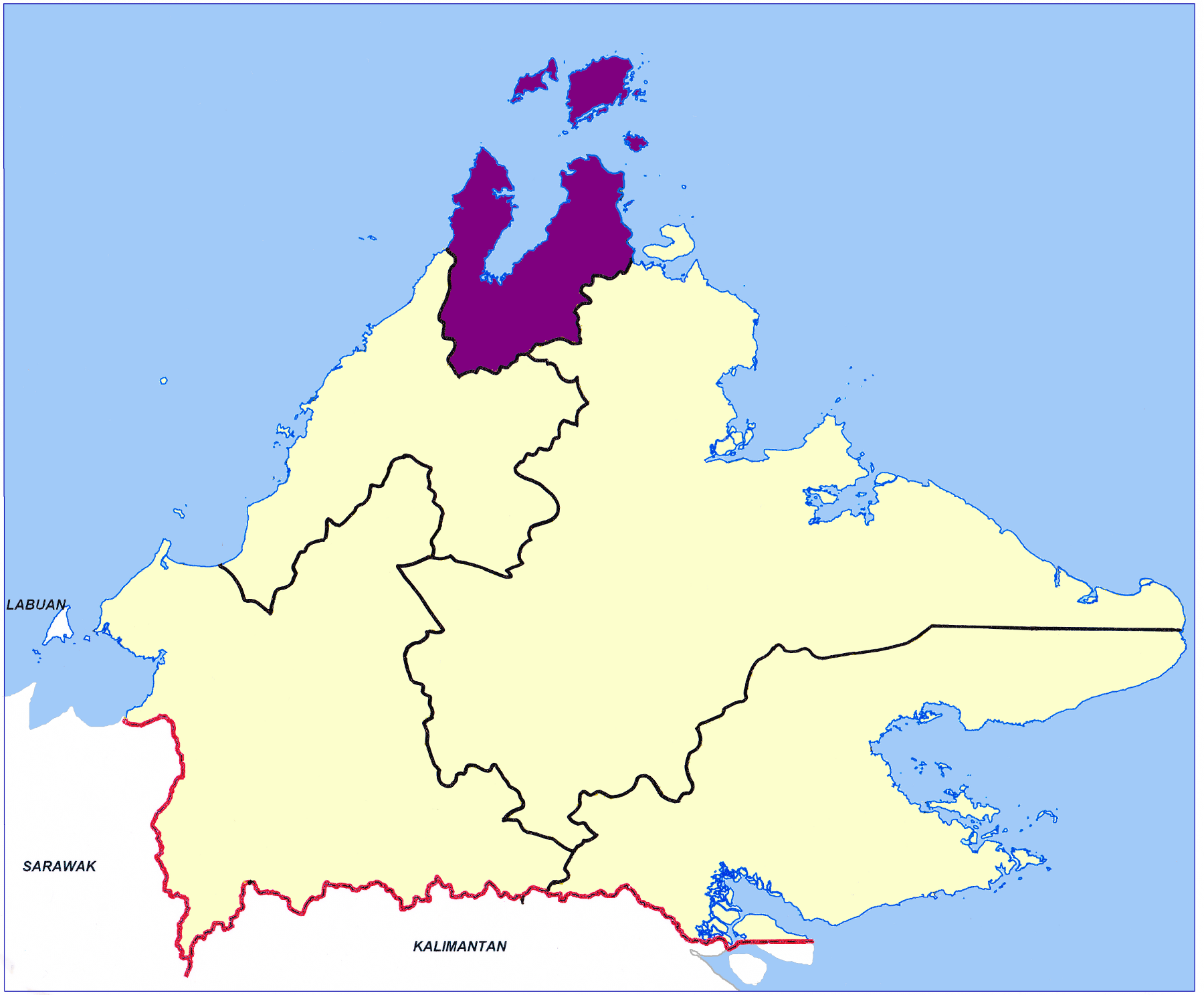
Location map of the Kudat Division.

Kudat Division (Malay: Bahagian Kudat) is an administrative division in the state of Sabah, Malaysia. It occupies the northern tip of Sabah. Its total area of 4,623 square kilometres (6.3% of Sabah's total territory) makes it the smallest of the five divisions of Sabah. The division covers the districts of Kudat, Pitas and Kota Marudu, as well as the islands of Balak, Balambangan, Banggi, Bankawan, Guhuan Utara (North Guhuan), Kalampunian and Malawali.

As of 2010, the division had 186,516 inhabitants, making up approximately 6% of Sabah's total population. It is mostly inhabited by the Rungus people. Kudat is the largest town and main transport hub within the division. Commodities are transported to the division via the town's port, and its airport is the only one in the division.

== Districts ==
Kudat Division is subdivided into the following administrative districts:

- Kota Marudu District (1,917 km^{2}) (Kota Marudu Town)
- Kudat District (1,287 km^{2}) (Kudat Town)
- Pitas District (1,419 km^{2}) (Pitas Town)

== Constituencies ==
Two parliamentary constituencies and seven state constituencies.

Kudat division is divided into two federal constituencies and seven state constituencies:

Parliament			Legislative Assembly		
Constituency	MPs (2022)	Party	Constituency	MLAs (2020)	Party
P167 Kudat	Verdon Bahanda	Independent	N01 Banggi	Mohammad Mohamarin	GRS (Gagasan)
P167 Kudat	Verdon Bahanda	Independent	N02 Bengkoka	Harun Durabi	BN (UMNO)
P167 Kudat	Verdon Bahanda	Independent	N03 Pitas	Ruddy Awah	GRS (GAGASAN)
P167 Kudat	Verdon Bahanda	Independent	N04 Tanjong Kapor	Ben Chong Chen Bin	GRS (GAGASAN)
P168 Kota Marudu	Wetrom Bahanda	KDM	N05 Matunggong	Julita Majungki	GRS (PBS)
P168 Kota Marudu	Wetrom Bahanda	KDM	N06 Bandau	Wetrom Bahanda	KDM
P168 Kota Marudu	Wetrom Bahanda	KDM	N07 Tandek	Hendrus Anding	GRS (PBS)

== History ==
The present divisions of Sabah is largely inherited from the division of the North Borneo Chartered Company. Following the acquisition of North Borneo under the royal charter issued in 1881, the administrative division introduced by Baron von Overbeck was continued by the establishment of two residences comprising West Coast Residency and East Coast Residency. Seat of the two residents was in Sandakan, where the governor was based. Each resident, in turn, was divided into several provinces managed by a district officer. (Note: The original position was initially Magistrates-in-charge.)

As North Borneo progresses, the number of residencies has increased to five including: Tawau Residency (also known as East Coast Residency), Sandakan Residency, West Coast Residency, Kudat Residency, and Interior Residency; the provinces were initially named after the members of the board: Alcock, Cunlife, Dewhurst, Keppel, Dent, Martin, Elphinstone, Myburgh and Mayne. The senior residents occupied Sandakan and the West Coast, while the other three resident with the second class residencies occupied Interior, East Coast and Kudat. The residents of Sandakan and West Coast were members of the Legislative Council, the Legislative Assembly of the Company.

The division into residencies was maintained when North Borneo became a Crown Colony after World War II. On 16 September 1963, with the formation of Malaysia, North Borneo which subsequently became the state of Sabah took over the administrative structure through the Ordinance on Administrative Units. At the same time, the Yang di-Pertua Negeri, the head of state of Sabah, was authorised by proclamation to divide the state into divisions and districts. (Note: The most recent such proclamation dates from 2009: Administrative Divisions Proclamation 2009.) The abolition of the residency term was in favour of the division term that took place in 1976.

Today, the division has only formal significance and no longer constitutes its own administrative level. The resident's post was also abolished, as Sabah's municipal administration is in the hands of the district officers.

== See also ==
- Divisions of Malaysia

== Literature ==
- Tregonning, K. G. (1965). A History Of Modern Sabah (North Borneo 1881–1963). University of Malaya Press.
