= Kudat District =

Kudat District Daerah Kudat
- District
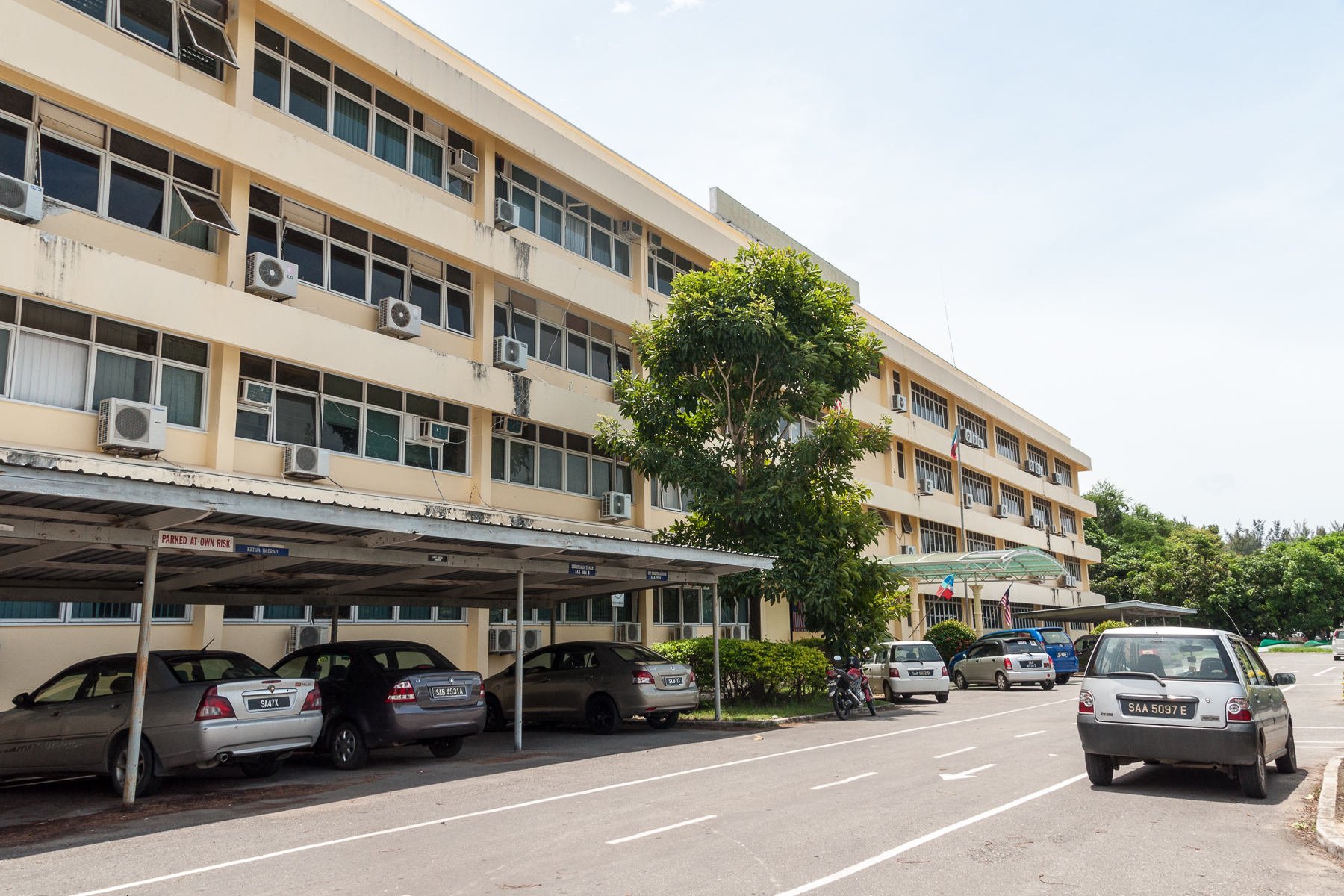
- Kudat District Council office.

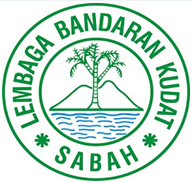
- Seal

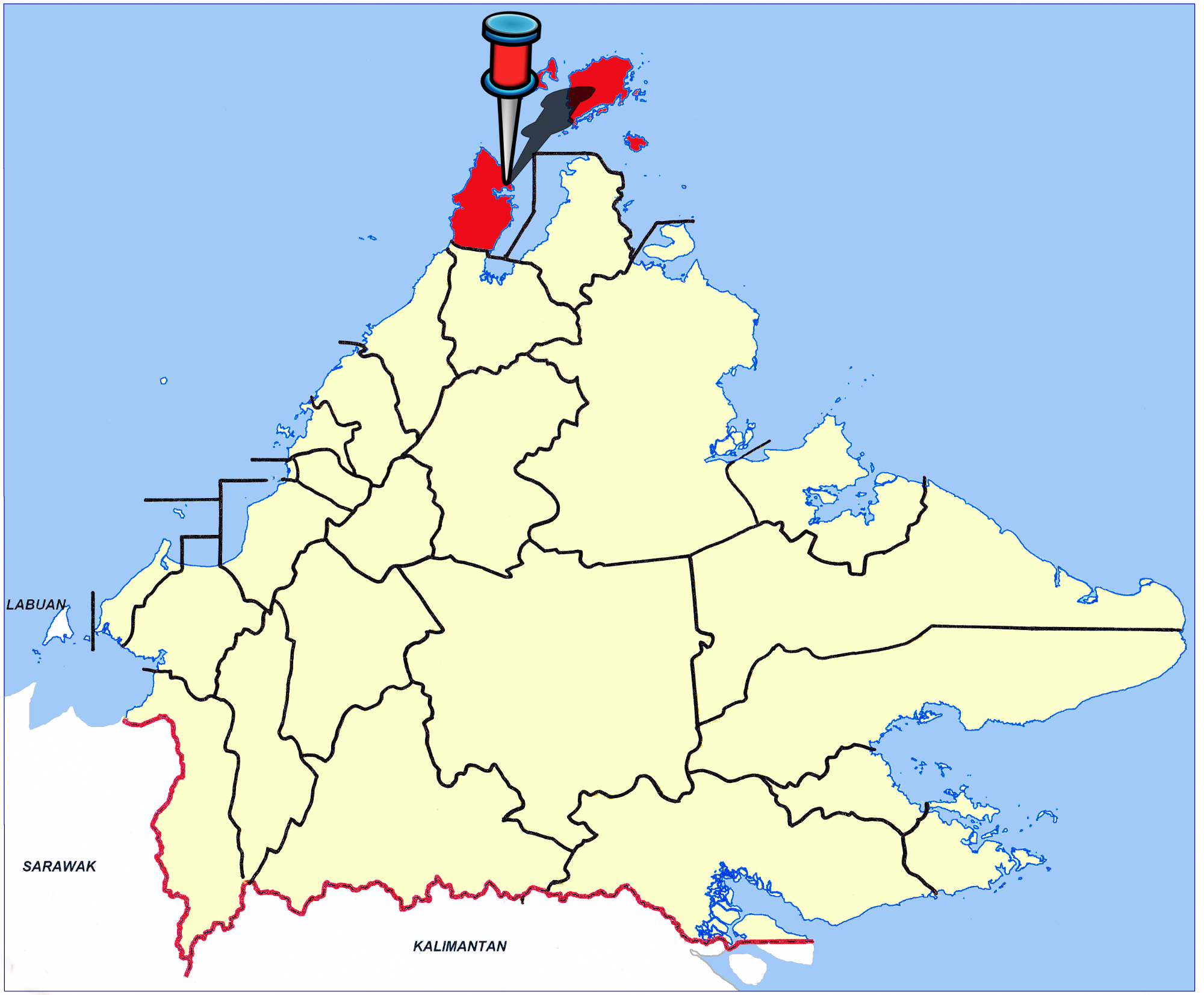
- Coordinates: 6°53′00″N 116°50′00″E
- Country: Malaysia
- State: Sabah
- Division: Kudat
- Capital: Kudat

Government
  - District Officer: Alexander Yong

Area
  - Total: 1,287 km^{2} (497 sq mi)

Population (2010)
  - Total: 83,140
- Website: pdkudat.sbh.gov.my lbkudat.sabah.gov.my

Map of Kudat District

The Kudat District (Malay: Daerah Kudat) is an administrative district in the Malaysian state of Sabah, part of the Kudat Division which includes the districts of Kota Marudu, Kudat and Pitas. The capital of the district is in Kudat Town.

== Etymology ==
In the past, Kudat was known locally as "Tanjong Berungus" and sometimes also called "Tambarungan". During the early arrival of Chinese traders at Tanjung Berungus, they were surprised to see a kind of grass growing everywhere. The desperation forced them to ask the locals comprising the Rungus tribes who are the native inhabitants of the place who later explained to them that the grass is called "Kutad" in their language. The place then became the centre of meeting between the local and Chinese traders to carry out trading activities. However, since the Chinese pronunciation was inaccurate, the term "Kudat" eventually emerging and became synonymously used among the people. While another story from the Binadan people explained the word Kudat comes from a reaction “takkudad aku” in their language which mean "I am shocked" after a people from their tribes shocking when hearing a ship named Santi while they sailing from Limau-Limauan to Tanjung Berungus. The event subsequently gave them an idea among their community who also agreed to name Tanjung Berungus as Kudat.

== History ==
The area around Kudat was once under the thalassocracy of the Sultanate of Brunei and later Sulu. In 1763, the British East India Company gained the Balambangan Island and set-up trading post. A British settlement was opened in 1773 but closed the following years after being attacked by Sulu pirates. It was reopened again in 1803 before closed again. After the reinforcement of British troops to combating piracy in northern Borneo been increased, the British began to establish a solid presence in North Borneo with the establishment of North Borneo Chartered Company with Kudat become its first capital.

== Demographics ==
According to the last census in 2010, the population of Kudat district is estimated to be around 83,140. It consists of a majority of Rungus, a sub-group of the Kadazan-Dusun peoples. About 10% of the inhabitants are Chinese (mainly Hakka), and there are also a minorities of Bajau, Dusun, Murut, Bugis and Malay. As in other districts of Sabah, there are a significant number of illegal immigrants from the nearby southern Philippines, mainly from the Sulu Archipelago and Mindanao, many of whom are not included in the population statistics.

== Gallery ==
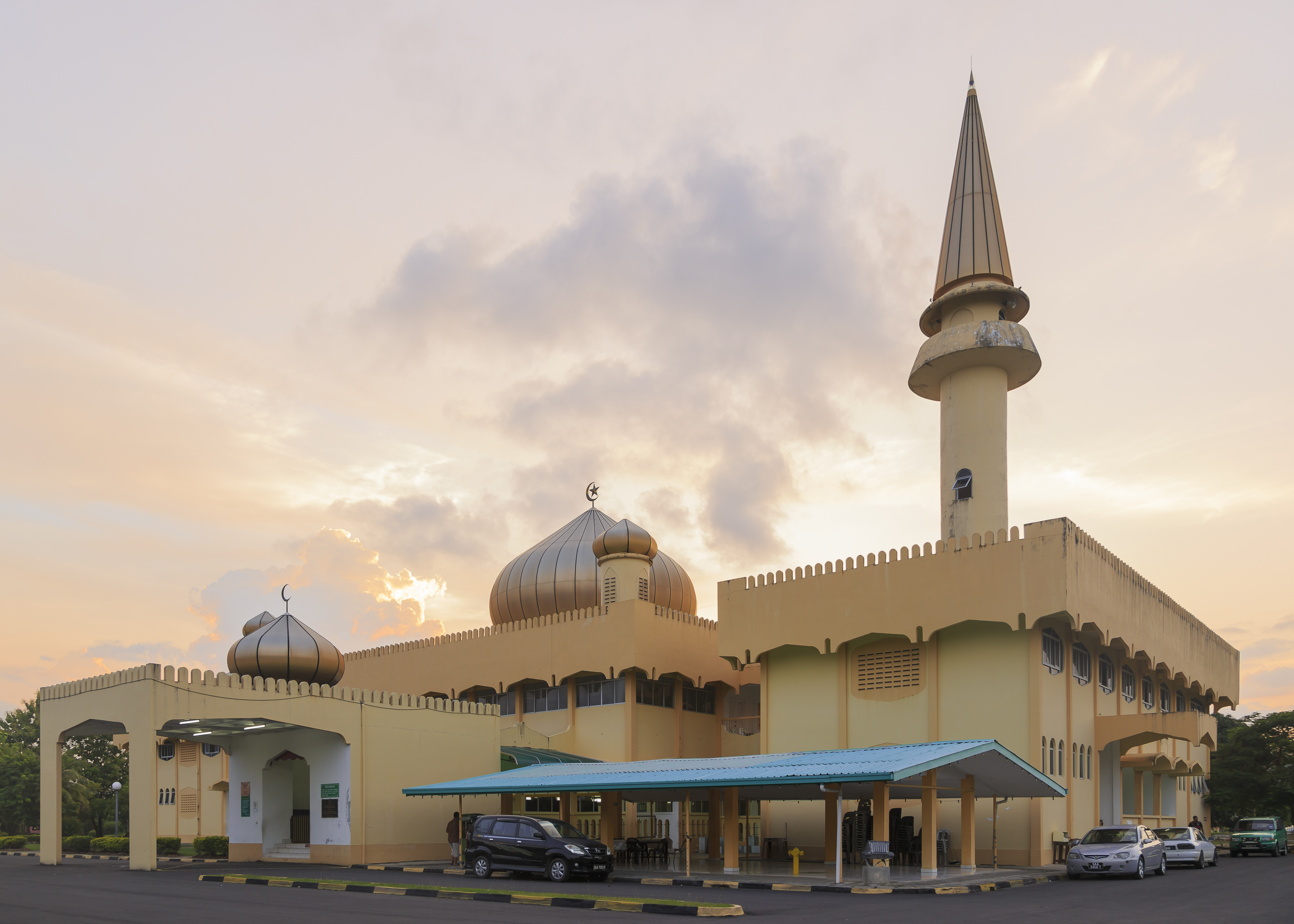
Asy-Syakirin Mosque.

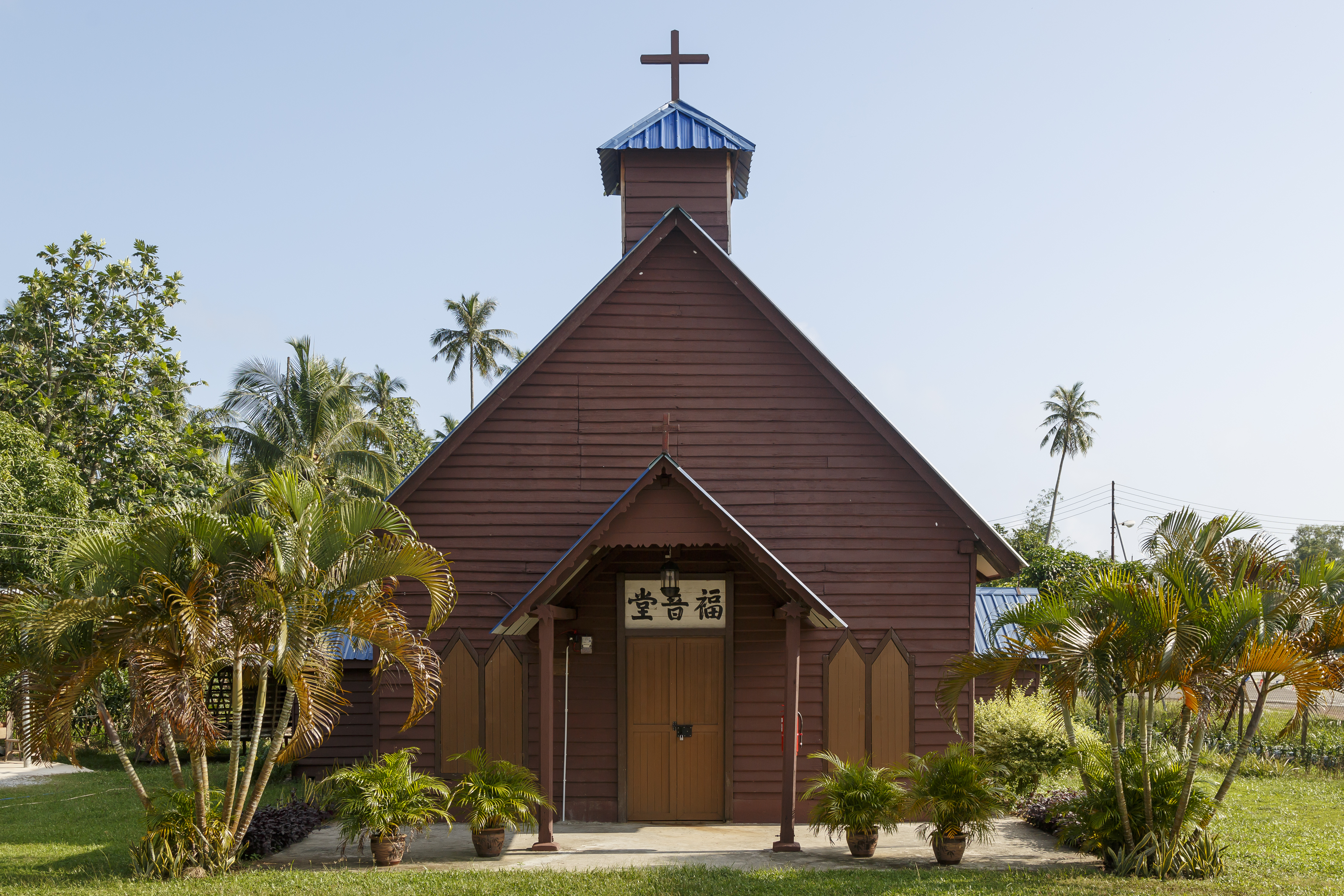
Sin San Anglican Church.

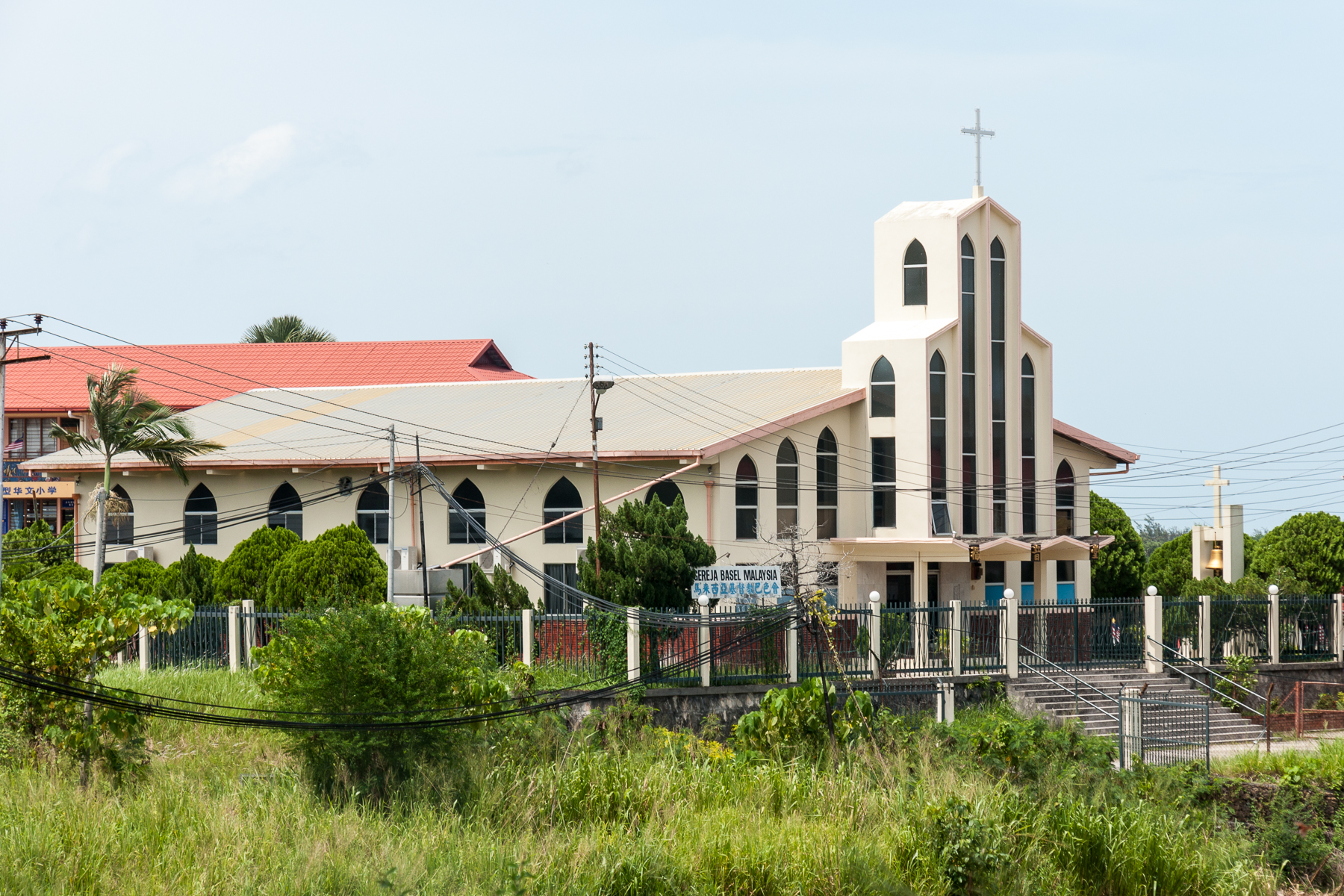
Kudat Basel Church.

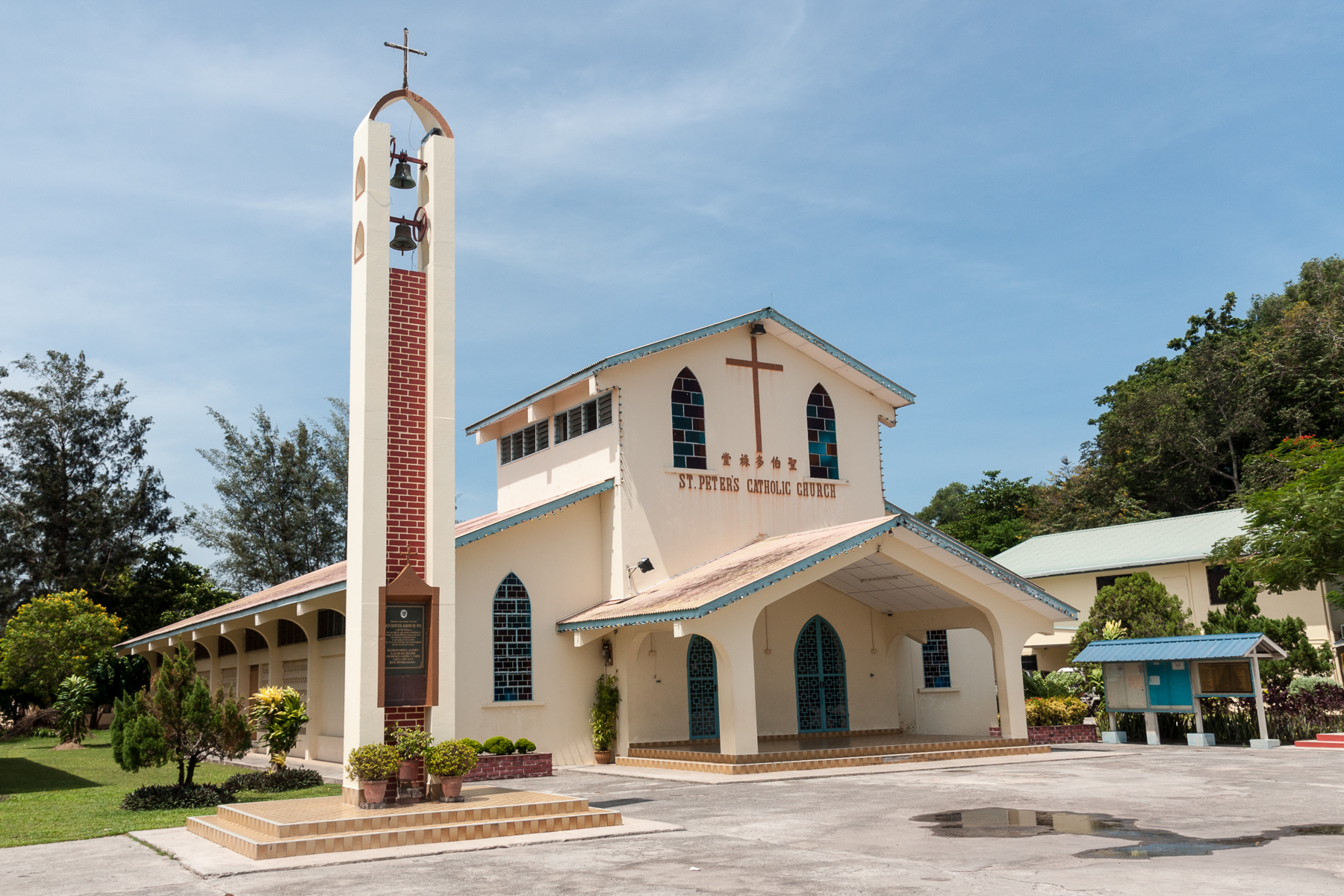
St. Peter Catholic Church.

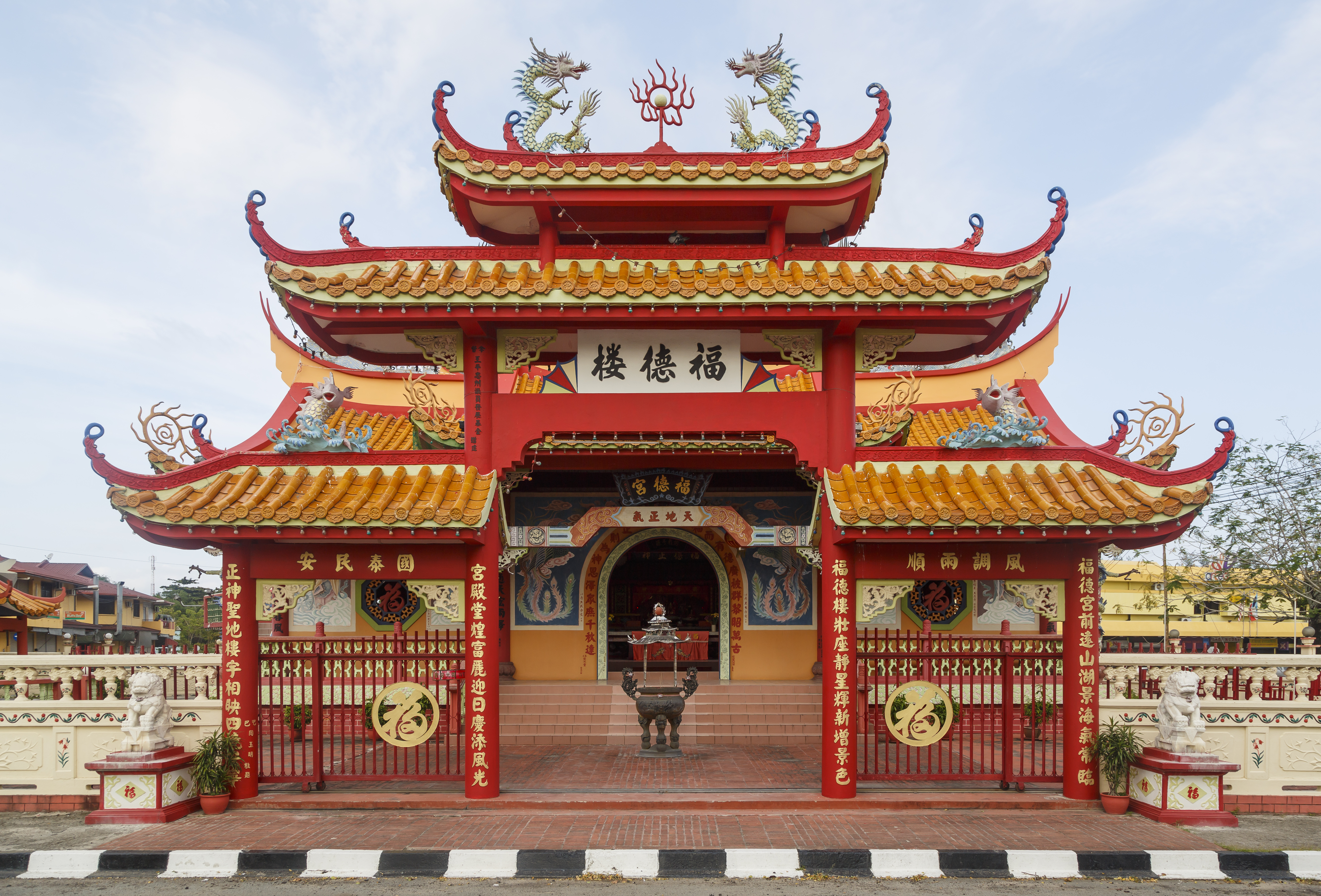
Fuk Tek Kung Temple.

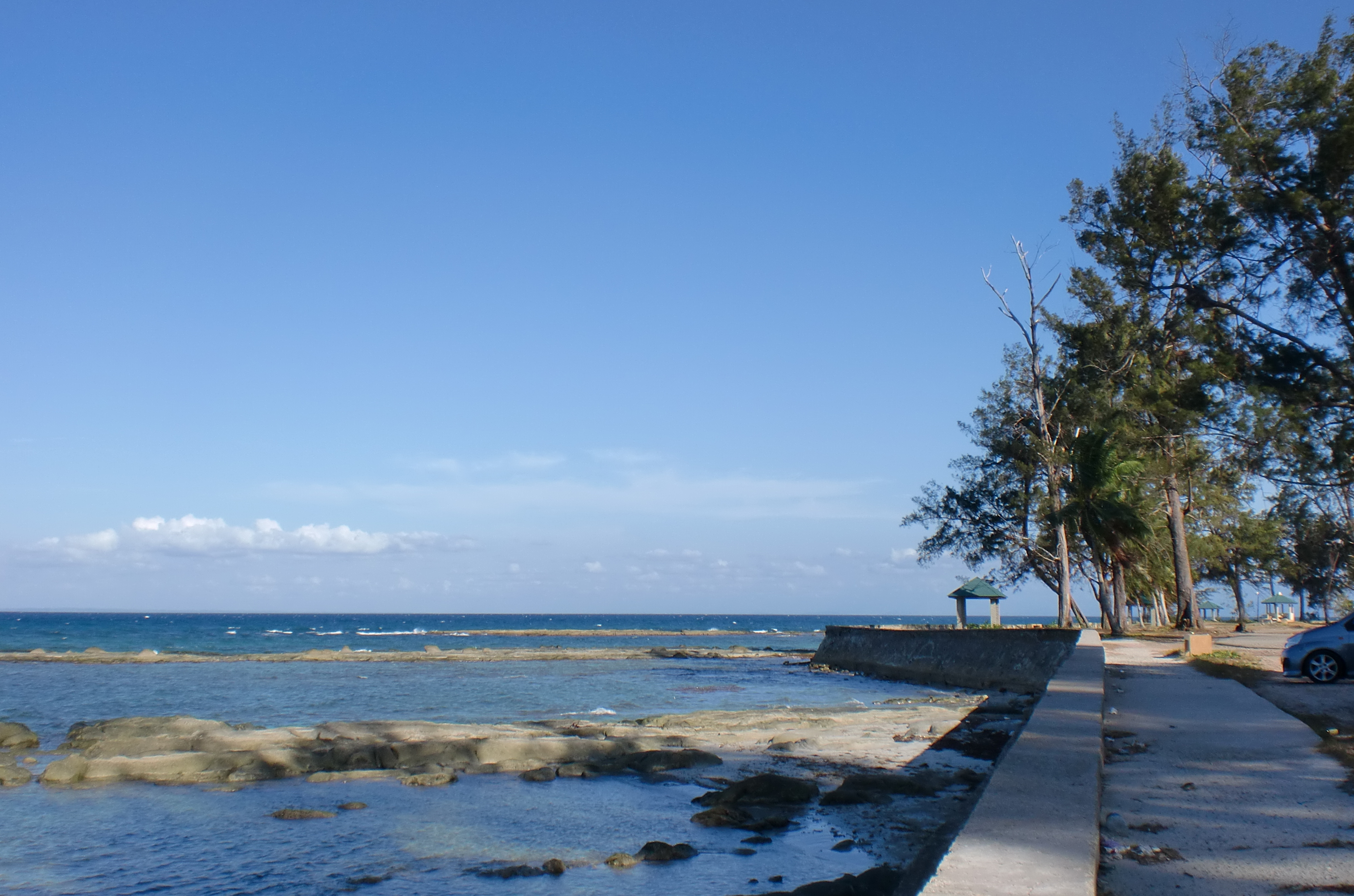
Bak Bak beach.

== See also ==
- Districts of Malaysia
