= Cross border attacks in Sabah =

1962–present Moro attacks in Sabah, Malaysia

- Part of the Piracy in the Sulu Sea, North Borneo dispute, Moro conflict, and the spillovers of the Philippines drug war and of the Insurgency in South Thailand
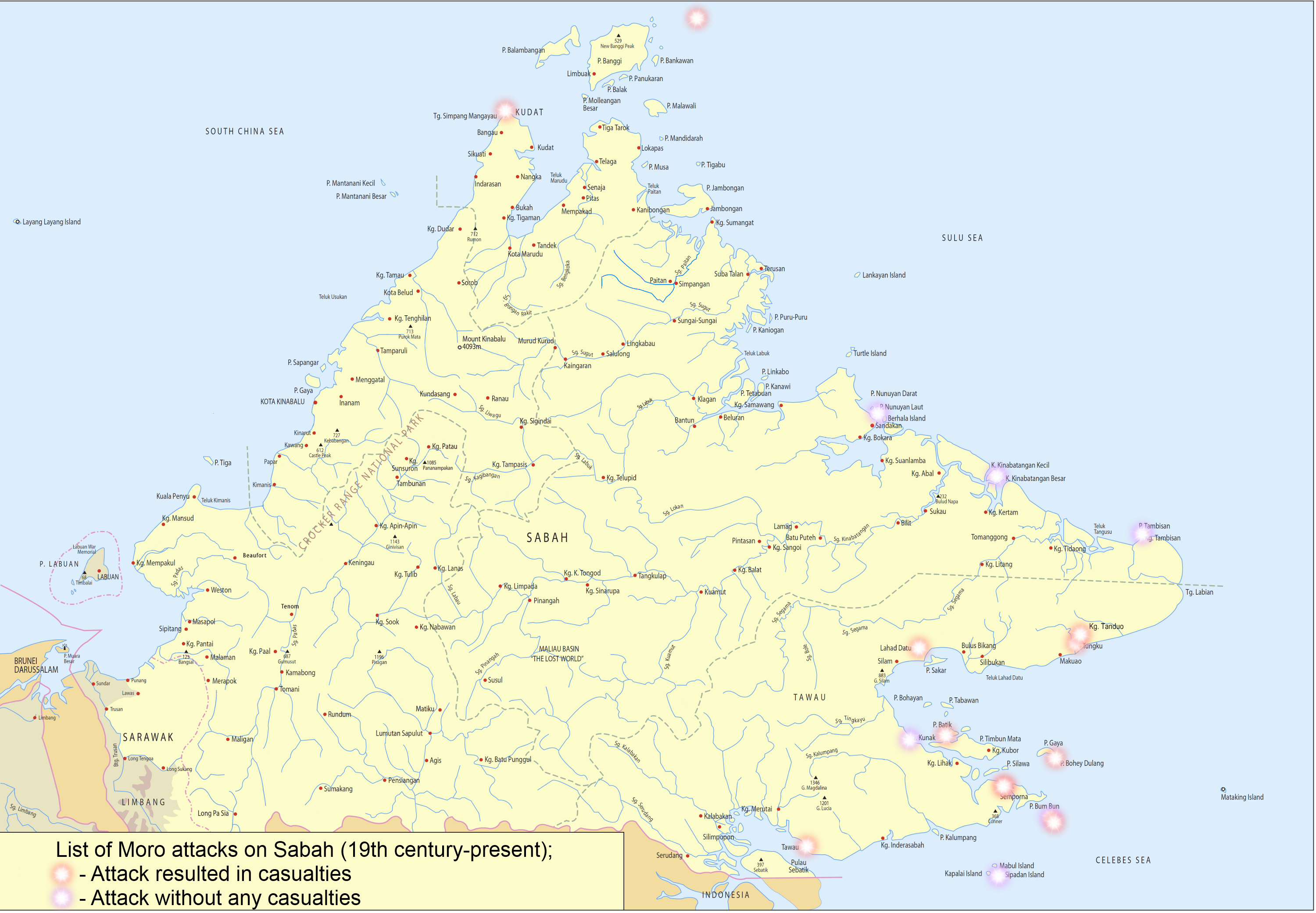
- Attacks by Moro pirates and militants in Sabah from the 19th century to the present
Date	8 December 1962 – present (63 years, 11 months, 1 week and 2 days)
Location	Sabah, Malaysia with spillovers in Klang
Status	Ongoing

Belligerents
Malaysia; Sabah; Philippines (1986–2016); Indonesia; Vietnam; Singapore; Thailand; Bangsamoro militia support: MILF; MNLF (Mus Sema faction)	Abu Sayyaf; Philippines (until 1986, since 2016); Moro Pirates (since 1963); Sulu Sultanate (Jamalul Kiram III faction; since 2013); Former Sabah invasion supporter: MNLF (Misuari faction; 2001–2015); USFBR (2013)

Commanders and leaders
Anwar Ibrahim; Mohamed Khaled Nordin; Hajiji Noor; Prabowo Subianto; Murad Ebrahim Mohagher Iqbal Muslimin Sema; Former leaders: Malaysian prime ministers: Tunku Abdul Rahman (1962–1970) #; Abdul Razak Hussein (1970–1976) #; Hussein Onn (1976–1981) #; Mahathir Mohamad (1981–2003, 2018–2020); Abdullah Ahmad Badawi (2003–2009); Najib Razak (2009–2018); Muhyiddin Yassin (2020–2021); Ismail Sabri Yaakob (2021-2022); Sabah chief ministers: Fuad Stephens †; Peter Lo Sui Yin #; Mustapha Harun #; Mohamed Said Keruak; Harris Salleh; Joseph Pairin Kitingan; Sakaran Dandai; Salleh Said Keruak; Yong Teck Lee; Bernard Giluk Dompok; Osu Sukam; Chong Kah Kiat; Musa Aman; Shafie Apdal; Philippines presidents: Corazon Aquino #; Fidel V. Ramos #; Joseph Estrada; Gloria Macapagal Arroyo; Benigno Aquino III #; Indonesian presidents: Susilo Bambang Yudhoyono; Joko Widodo	Radullan Sahiron (POW); Abdurajak Janjalani †; Khadaffy Janjalani †; Isnilon Totoni Hapilon † Bongbong Marcos; Phudgal Kiram; Various pirate leaders Jamalul Kiram III # Agbimuddin Kiram # Ismael Kiram II # Former support: Diosdado Macapagal # Ferdinand Marcos # Rodrigo Duterte; Nur Misuari (2001–2015)

Units involved
NSOF; Malaysian Armed Forces; Royal Malaysia Police; Malaysian Maritime Enforcement Agency; Indonesian National Armed Forces; Indonesian National Police; 1986–2016: Armed Forces of the Philippines; Philippine National Police; British coalition (until 1966): Royal Australian Navy; Royal New Zealand Navy; British troops and navy	Abu Sayyaf; Moro Pirates; Royal Security Forces of the Sultanate of Sulu and North Borneo

Strength
Malaysian security forces: Malaysian Army; 6,000+ troops; 18 ACV-300 Adnan IFV; 12 DefTech AV8 AFV; Some of AV4 Lipanbara MRAP; Some of Condor APC; Royal Malaysian Air Force; A squadron of BAE Hawk; 3 F/A-18D Hornet; Some of Eurocopter EC725; Royal Malaysian Navy; Ships from Eastern Fleet; Philippine security forces: uncertain; Indonesian security forces: uncertain; Law-abiding Moro rebels: uncertain; British coalition (until 1966): Australian forces; HMAS Tobruk; HMAS Sydney (R17); New Zealand forces; Patrol ships; British forces; Thousands British troops	Abu Sayyaf: unknown; Kiram followers: 235; Moro Pirates: unknown

Casualties and losses
Malaysian security forces: ≈12+ deaths and 13 wounded recorded; Philippine security forces: uncertain (Note: A number of Philippine police and soldiers were also killed in their mission to suppress the piracy and criminal activities in the Sulu Archipelago.); Indonesian security forces: uncertain; Law-abiding Moro rebels: uncertain (Note: A number of law abiding Moro rebels from the group of MNLF and MILF were also killed in their mission to control the persistent lawlessness in Mindanao and the Sulu Archipelago.); British coalition (until 1966); uncertain	Abu Sayyaf: 21+ killed; 3 wounded; 10+ captured; Kiram followers: 58 killed; 3 wounded; Moro Pirates: Hundreds killed
- Civilian casualties; ~estimated 50+ killed; ~estimated 23 wounded
- ~ The total thought to be higher than what has been shown.

The cross border attacks in Sabah are a series of cross border terrorist attacks perpetrated by Moro pirates from Mindanao, Philippines, in the state of Sabah, Malaysia, that began even before the British colonial period. Many civilians have died or suffered during these incidents, causing an increase in anti-Filipino sentiment among the native peoples of Sabah, especially after major attacks in 1985, 2000 and 2013. The attacks were more intense during the presidential terms of Diosdado Macapagal and Ferdinand Marcos, who supported irredentist claims to include eastern Sabah as part of the Philippines territory. In addition, recent infiltration and attacks by militants as well as uncontrolled human migration from Mindanao to Sabah has led to more unease among the local residents of Sabah, with around 78% of prison inmates that were caught in the state due to involvement in criminal activities and lawlessness issues mainly originating from the southern Philippines.

Prior to a large-scale military operation initiated by Philippine President Rodrigo Duterte to combat the rampant lawlessness in the southern Philippines since mid-2016, Malaysian security forces had been told to tighten its security and to ensure that terrorists do not attempt to flee prosecution by escaping to uninhabited areas. Sabahan leaders also ordered Malaysian security forces to "shoot on sight" any trespassers who continue to ignore laws despite repeated warnings and that those escaping militants be dealt with by the country's laws more effectively. Following the declaration of martial law in the neighbouring Philippines since 23 May 2017, Malaysian authorities increased their border security. Sabah Chief Minister Shafie Apdal also urged the Malaysian security forces to stop taking a defensive attitude and be offensive towards the rampant crimes perpetrated by southern Filipino criminals and terrorists that has disturbed peace in the state.

Various countries and territories such as Australia, Canada, China, France, Germany, Hong Kong, Ireland, Japan, New Zealand, Singapore, South Korea, Switzerland, Taiwan, United Kingdom, United States and Vietnam have raised a travel alert for their citizens to avoid the area in eastern Sabah.

== Background ==
Piracy has been a part of the Sultanate of Sulu's culture. During the expedition by the British ship HMS Dido in 1846, Captain Henry Keppel mentioned:

The most desperate and active pirates of the whole Indian Archipelago are the tribes of the Sooloo group of islands lying close to the north shore of Borneo.

— Captain Henry Keppel.

The Sulu islands were known for their "great slave market" with their islanders frequently attacking Borneo Island in search of slaves. In 1910, the neighbouring Celebes Islands was attacked by seven Moro pirates that had crossed from Mindanao, and two Dutch traders were killed in the incident. Subsequent reports from the British government in North Borneo reported that Joloano Moros terrorised the inhabitants of North Borneo, looting small towns and killing many people. Although the British did a lot to combat piracy, an office of a British company was later raided by twelve Moro pirates in Kalabakan in July 1958. Another raid was done on the nearby township of Semporna on 29 March 1954. During the last years of British rule in North Borneo, both seafarers and coastal settlements suffered a high numbers of attacks from pirates who were believed to be mainly based on Tawi-Tawi. Between 1959 and 1962, 232 pirates attack were recorded by the British authorities in North Borneo, but these were thought to be underestimated as many attacks went unreported. The British North Borneo governor at the time, Roland Turnbull had requested the British to provide him with security forces from the Royal Navy and Royal Air Force but no aid was sent until a British newspaper, the Daily Telegraph embellished the report with an anti-Indonesian bias because of the Indonesia–Malaysia confrontation.

=== Moro migration to Sabah ===
Regional migration flows within Southeast Asia are not a phenomenon restricted to current times. Social and cultural connections between Sabah, Mindanao and the Indonesian province of North Kalimantan have existed for centuries. The tradition of border crossing from the Philippine Sulu Archipelago to Sabah originated in the late 16th century. The first wave of this migration was linked to the Spanish colonialists who began pushing southwards toward the island provinces of Sulu and Tawi-Tawi from Manila, which was the administration centre of the Spanish during that time. The struggle for dominance between different ethnic groups and the Spanish in Mindanao led to increased immigration of Philippine Moro ethnic groups, mostly the Suluks and Bajaus to Sabah.

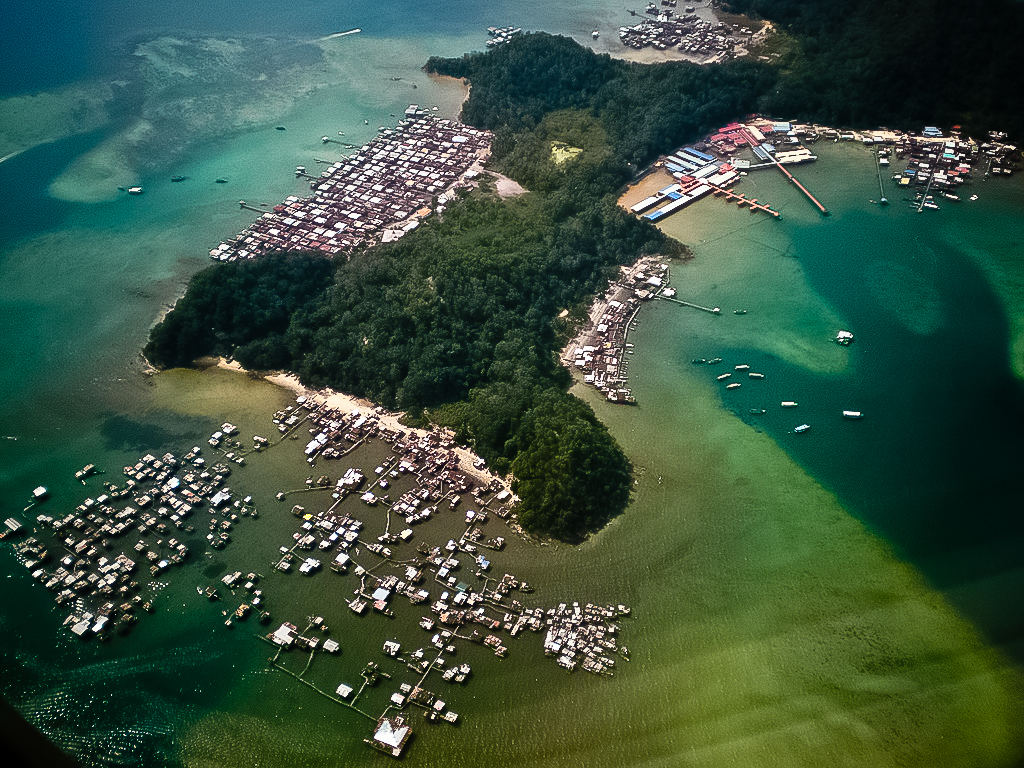
A huge Moro settlements in the coast of Gaya Island near Kota Kinabalu.

The first arrival of the illegal immigrants in Sabah in the 1960s was said to be associated with the then Philippine president Ferdinand Marcos and his country's claim to the northern Borneo region. It is claimed by media in the Philippines that during the first stage of his plan, Marcos sent around 17 men who mostly recruited from Sulu and Tawi-Tawi had entered Sabah as forest rangers, postmen and police. These agents have blended into the Sabah local communities with a plan to possessing the minds of the larger Filipino communities in eastern Sabah to secede from Malaysia and become part of the Philippines as well to destabilising Sabah. At the same time, a Suluk native, Mustapha Harun became the third Chief Minister of Sabah, he then made a contact with one of the Filipino agent who became his driver. However, most of them did not intend to attack their fellow Muslim brothers in Sabah when they realised their true mission in which they were later executed by Marcos commando soldiers in an event known as Jabidah massacre. During Mustapha's term from 1967 to 1975, he was believed to have encouraged many newly Filipino Tausūgs to migrate to northern Borneo to establish a strong Muslim community which was represented by the United Sabah National Organisation (USNO). Since the massacre especially with the starting of Moro insurgency in the Philippines, Mustapha is believed to have supplied the Moro rebels with financial and weapon supports to fight for their freedom and to take a revenge for their fallen comrades.

Since then, it has caused major economic problems for Sabah as Marcos soldiers launched an operation to eliminate any anti-Marcos factions in the Sulu and Mindanao islands which left much infrastructure there destroyed, forcing another estimated 100,000 Moros in Mindanao to flee to Sabah. Most of those who left the Philippines were already involved in criminal activities, mainly smuggling and armed robbery. Today, a huge numbers of Moros still live in many places in Sabah such as Kota Kinabalu, Kinarut, Lahad Datu, Sandakan, Semporna, Tawau, Telipok as well on Labuan. Most of the Filipino refugees are issued with IMM13 documents by the Malaysian government during Mahathir Mohamad administration, with many of them have been controversially naturalised as citizen.

Besides that, the present economic disparity between Mindanao and Sabah became the main reason many of these illegal Moros snuck into Sabah with some of those "extremist" Moros with their own ideology still perceive the eastern part of Sabah as part of the Philippines, and these groups feel entitled to enter Sabah as it is their historical right although the Sultanate of Sulu have defunct since the last recognised Sultan, Jamalul Kiram II whose have no son to inherit his powers.

Despite the common negative views on Filipino immigrants for the crimes in Sabah, several Islamist terrorist attacks targeting Philippine cities were perpetrated by extremists of Malaysian descent. Filipino Moros who fled from the war in the Philippines were forced to flee the devastation of the Moro conflict, a conflict which was tacitly supported by the Malaysian government.

In 2014, the Eastern Sabah Security Command (Esscom) Security Coordinating Intelligence Officer Hassim Justin blamed corruption, illegal issuance of identity cards and local authorities who did not taking any action to combat the squatter colonies for contributing to the significant increase of illegal immigrants in Sabah. It was also reported that community leaders in the east coast such as village chief were involved in the granting of identity cards to new Filipino Moro immigrants as they have a connection with them through similar ethnic roots. According to a research by two Filipino researchers, Myfel Joseph Paluga and Andrea Malaya Ragragio of the Department of Social Science University of the Philippines Mindanao, the flood of migrants from Mindanao to Sabah was partly encouraged by certain Sabah politicians who wanted to be the Sultan of Sulu especially after the fall of Sabah Muslim-led parties of USNO and Sabah People's United Front (BERJAYA) administrations. Beside that, it was claimed by Indonesian workers who had become victims of irresponsible employers, the arrival of illegal immigrants from the Philippines are also caused by employers who abuse their powers especially in the agricultural sectors of palm oil plantation.

== Timeline of attacks ==
=== Attack strategy ===
The tactics are different, and are based on the motives of individual groups. Generally, the Moro pirate and militants will attack and escape to the Malaysia–Philippines border or any nearby islands when their activities are spotted by the security forces. Both the pirates and militants will usually steal boat engines, food and other useful things that can be sold. In certain cases, they also attack towns, killing innocent civilians and kidnapping them as shown in the Lahad Datu and Semporna attacks. The Filipino illegal immigrants play an important role in helping them by providing information on their next target. Due to the increase security patrol by the Malaysian Armed Forces, militant group such as the Abu Sayyaf have changed their tactics by attacking and abducting foreign vessel crews. Many of those fleeing from the Philippine military operation in the southern Philippines also sneak into Sabah by entering the state in a small group to avoid being detected as suspicious by the Malaysian security forces, this was discovered following a tip-off from local villagers who saw many new suspicious people coming into their village from the sea shortly after the continuous military operation. Many of them are believed to be members of militant and kidnapping groups.

=== 20th century ===
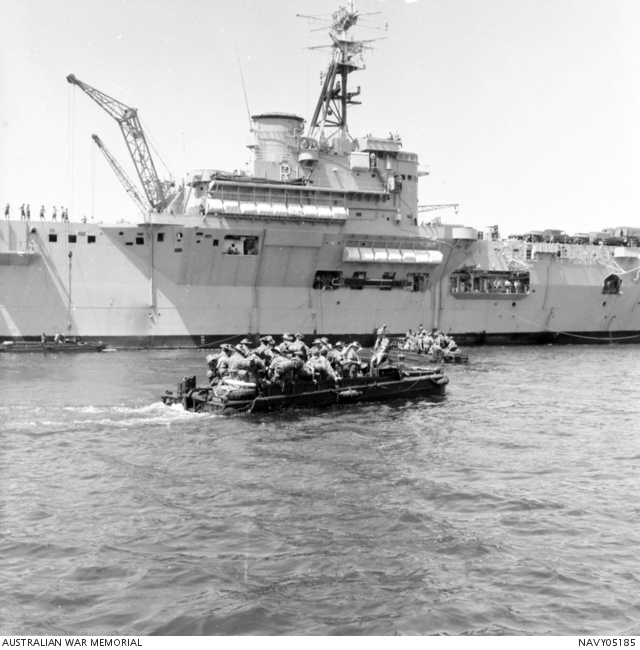
Australian soldiers being ferried in a small craft, from troop transport HMAS Sydney on its arrival in North Borneo (Sabah) to counter Indonesian confrontation and possible attacks by Filipino pirates as part of their defence aid program to Malaysia in 1964.

In 1962, seven Filipino Moros armed with machetes attacked the town of Kunak and robbed the businessmen there. The seven Filipino Moros attacked again in 1963, this time attacking the town of Semporna and killing a number of residents. In October 1979, a passenger boat on the way to Semporna from Lahad Datu with 48 passengers was attacked and forced to dock at Adal Island. Three passengers were shot dead, one woman was raped and the others was taken to the Philippines but were quickly rescued by the Philippine security forces. In 1980, a group of 6–8 Moros attacked an island near Semporna with M16 rifles, killing villagers while they were asleep. At the end, seven villagers were killed while 11 others were injured. In 1982, a groups of Moros ambushed a village in Timba-Timba Island, and started to shoot, rob and kill villagers. The incident in 1985, which is considered to be the most terrifying attack out of all of them, was where 21 people were killed and another 11 wounded. Five of the intruders were killed by the Malaysian maritime police while the others managed to escaped. At the end of the tragedy, one of the victim said;

I cannot help wondering about our government, which can't seem to defend us against these marauders.

In 1987, two Japanese managers were killed while others were wounded after twelve gunmen attack a factory in the Boheydulang Island, forcing the company to close and move their factory to Indonesia. In 1996, two separate armed groups from Mindanao attack the town of Semporna, the first group attack a police station by throwing a fish bomb while the second group managed to steal jewellery worth around MYR100,000 at a gold shop. During the shoot-out, two of the group members were captured by the police with 200 bullets recovered from them. However, the rest managed to escape. In March 1996, another attacks by 10–20 Moros happens in the town of Semporna when three separate armed groups attacked different places at the same time. The first group attacked a police headquarters while the second group attacked a police station. It is acknowledged the motive of the first and second group was to delay time and let the third group succeed in robbing a gold shop. No arrest was made and all the intruders managed to escaped with MYR 200,000. Again in July 1996, four armed men attack a gold shop in Tawau and managed to steal jewellery worth around MYR 150,000. However, one of the gunmen later made a mistake when he retreated to a refugee village in Tawau where he was shot dead by the police. After an hour of investigation, another 5 gunmen from other groups were killed by the police.

=== 21st century ===
In 2000, the Abu Sayyaf group kidnapped a large number of hostages. 10 of the hostages were from Europe and the Middle East while 11 were Malaysian resort workers. All hostages were later rescued by the Philippine security forces in Jolo, Sulu. In 2003, six foreigners were kidnapped by 10 Moro pirates. In 2004, two Sarawakians and an Indonesian were kidnapped by the Abu Sayyaf group. In 2005, five Filipinos abducted three Indonesian crew from a Sandakan-based trading company near Mataking Island off Semporna. In 2010, a crew of fishermen were captured by Filipino gunmen when their boat strayed into Philippine waters near Boan Island. All crews was later released without any ransom being paid. Also in the same year, a seaweed manager and supervisor were kidnapped by four armed Filipinos on Sebangkat Island. Both victims was freed 11 months later. In 2011, ten armed Filipinos kidnapped a Malaysian businessmen. On 11 February 2013, a group of approximately 100–200 individuals, some of them armed, arrived by boat in Lahad Datu, Sabah from Simunul, Tawi-Tawi, in Mindanao. They were sent by Jamalul Kiram III, one of the claimants to the throne of the Sultanate of Sulu. Their objective was to assert their unresolved territorial claim to North Borneo. During the standoff, 56 militants were killed including 6 civilians and 10 Malaysian forces. In November 2013, suspected Abu Sayyaf militants killed a Taiwanese national at Pom Pom Island and released his wife a month later in southern Philippines.

In January 2014, an attempted intrusion by foreign elements on Sabah was blocked by the Malaysian security forces. On 2 April 2014, a Chinese tourist and a Filipino national were abducted off Singamata Adventures Reef and Resort, Semporna. Two months later, they were rescued by Malaysian and Philippine security forces. On 6 May 2014, another abduction involving a Chinese national occurred in Silam, near the Lahad Datu area in Sabah. He was later freed on 10 July. On 16 June, a fish breeder and a Filipino worker were kidnapped off Kunak. The fish farm manager was freed on 10 December with the help of two Filipino negotiators, one of them being the leader of the Moro National Liberation Front. On 12 July, a policeman was shot dead and another marine policeman was abducted at Mabul Water Bungalows Resort, Mabul island. The policeman was later freed on 7 March 2015, after 9 months in captivity. On 9 October, two Filipino illegal immigrants who were identified as Sulu militants were killed by police in Penampang, both suspects has a record of criminal activities and were responsible for at least three robberies in the area. On 17 October, two Vietnamese fishermen who were working for a Malaysian employer, were shot by Filipino pirates. All of them were later rescued by the Malaysian security forces and sent to the Queen Elizabeth Hospital, Kota Kinabalu.

On 15 May 2015, four armed men from the Abu Sayyaf-based group in Mindanao abducted two people in a resort in Sandakan and brought them to Parang, Sulu. One of them been released on 9 November, after six months in captivity, while another one was beheaded due to ransom demands was not met. The Malaysian authorities identified that a number of kidnappings in Sabah was perpetrated by a group of Filipino brothers known as "Muktadil brothers" who sell their hostages to Abu Sayyaf group. Of all the five Muktadil brothers: Mindas Muktadil was killed by Philippine police in Jolo in May 2015, Kadafi Muktadil was arrested in late 2015, Nixon Muktadil and Brown Muktadil was killed during an operation by the Philippine military on 27 September 2016 after they resist for arrest, while Badong Muktadil succumbed to his injuries during his run after being shot at the time his brothers was killed. His body was discovered in a pump boat in Mususiasi area in Siasi Island, close to Jolo.

On 1 April 2016, four Malaysians aboard a tugboat from Manila was kidnapped when they arrived near the shore of Ligitan Island, while leaving other crews unharmed comprising three Myanmar nationals and two Indonesians. The four Malaysian hostages was later released after nearly two months in captivity. On 15 April, two Indonesian tugboats from Cebu, namely Henry and Cristi with 10 passengers were attacked by Abu Sayyaf militants. Four passengers were kidnapped, while another five were safe. One of the passenger was injured after being shot but were later rescued by Malaysian Maritime Enforcement Agency when they arrived into the waters of Malaysia. The four were released on 11 May with the help of the Philippine government. On 9 July, three Indonesians fishermen was kidnapped near the coast of Lahad Datu. On 18 July, five Malaysian sailors were also abducted near the coast of Lahad Datu. Another one Indonesian sailor was kidnapped in the waters of Malaysia on 3 August while leaving other two crews unharmed, the incident was only reported by victims on 5 August. Two of the Indonesian sailor hostages have managed to escape from the Abu Sayyaf after persistent threats of beheading.

On 10 September, three Filipino fishermen was kidnapped in the shores of Pom Pom Island in Sabah, Malaysia. The three Indonesians fishermen that was kidnapped on 9 July from Sabah were released on 17 September. On 27 September, one local boat-skipper was kidnapped from his trawler by seven armed Filipino militant before attacking another Indonesian trawler but no kidnapping were committed in the second incident. The boat-skipper was released on 1 October with no ransom been asked, along with three Indonesians hostages that were released on the same day. On 12 October, four armed men in a pump boat attacking two fishermen on a boat off Tigabu Island near Kudat. One of the fisherman who is an Indonesian sustained gunshot wounds and has been treated in the Duchess of Kent Hospital in Sandakan. On 24 October, six unidentified gunmen who spoke Tagalog rob a Malaysian trawler in international waters near Jambongan Island off Kudat, the incident was only reported to local authorities on 27 October due to long distance with any army post. Another attempt for kidnapping was thwarted by the Malaysian security forces on 31 October near Berhala Island, thought the perpetrators managed to escape. Two Indonesians were abducted near the shore of Kuala Kinabatangan on 5 November by unidentified gunmen based in Tawi-Tawi island of the Philippines. On 6 November, a German woman tourist was shot to dead while her boyfriend been abducted by Abu Sayyaf militants from their yacht off Tanjong Luuk Pisuk in Sabah. The German man was later beheaded after failed to pay ransom for his release. On 20 November, two Indonesian fishermen was kidnapped by five Abu Sayyaf gunmen off Lahad Datu, Sabah, while Philippine military been informed to intercept the bandit. Responding for the co-operation with neighbouring countries, since late 2016 more than 100 Abu Sayyaf militants have been killed by Philippine authorities, with another 30 killed in early 2017.

On 8 March 2017, a Vietnamese merchant ship was escorted safely to Malaysian waters by the local authorities after the ship's captain reported that he spotted a strange boat with six people on board from the Philippine waters following their vessel. On 23 March, Philippine authorities rescued two Malaysian hostages during its continuous major pursuit to destroy the group. Another three more Malaysian hostages rescued on 26 March. Following the continuous security operation collaboration between the Philippine and Malaysian authorities, the attacks by Abu Sayyaf have seen a beginning of decrease since the month of April. The Malaysian side announced that they would begin to lead the major active joint sea patrols in the Sulu and Celebes Sea with the authorities in Philippines and Indonesia to eliminate all forms of piracy and to clear the sea areas from criminal and terrorist activities that have been ongoing for decades.

From 2000 to 2016, there has been records of 20 kidnappings cases perpetrated by the Abu Sayyaf, with a total of 33 Malaysians and 31 foreigners have been kidnapped for ransom during the six years. Following the Philippine military major operations in the southern Philippines especially with the recent killings of many notable Abu Sayyaf leaders, the authorities there have foiled a big plan of the Abu Sayyaf to carry out large-scale kidnappings of foreigners from tourist island resorts in East Malaysia and the central Philippines. On 11 September 2018, two Indonesian fishermen working off eastern Sabah shores are kidnapped by Filipino bandits, making it as another first kidnapping incident in almost two years. On 10 June 2019, another ten sea gypsies were kidnapped by southern Filipino bandits from the waters in Lahad Datu. Nine of them were later released without harm on 22 June in the same month. On 4 September, two armed Filipino men were killed after they suddenly opened fire to Malaysian patrolling authorities who out to check two foreign boats acting suspiciously in Malaysian waters during night. In the ensuing shoot-out, the other boat also unheeded the warnings and escaped in darkness towards the direction of the southern Philippines. The increasing vigilance comes after the warning from Indonesian consulate in Sabah that there have been attempts by the Abu Sayyaf to carrying out raids for ransom in the east coast.

== Threats and impacts ==
=== Security ===
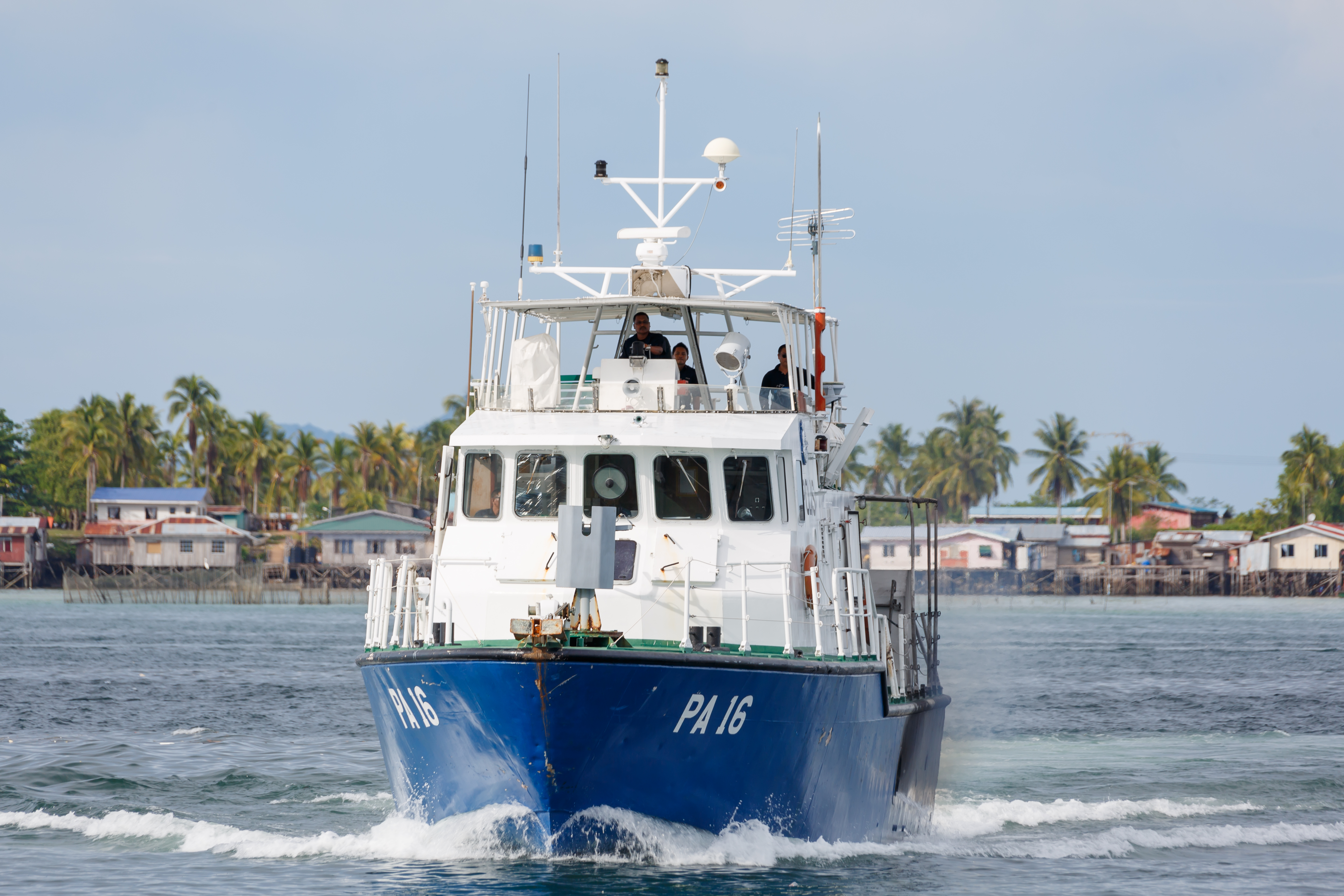
The Malaysian Maritime Police on duty patrolling the waters around Semporna especially on the Bajau Laut villages to prevent any further intrusion.

During the British colonial era, the British suffered a high number of attacks, leading to the deployment of Henry Keppel and James Brooke in 1846 to search for pirate nests in North Borneo. After a long journey of battling with the pirates, the last pirate's nest in Tunku, Lahad Datu was destroyed by the British.

The latest intrusion in 2013 caused the Malaysian government to establish the Eastern Sabah Security Command (ESSCOM), Eastern Sabah Security Zone (ESSZONE) and deploy more assets to Sabah. To combat Moro pirates and Abu Sayyaf attacks, the Malaysian government has also decided to impose a curfew on eastern Sabah waters and has started to use radar to detect any suspicious activities on every tiny settlement along the east coast. There is a call from a former Chief Minister of Sabah, Harris Salleh to the federal government to reconsider the proposal to move the Royal Malaysian Air Force (RMAF) base from Butterworth, Penang to Labuan. He suggested that the air force base should be relocated to Tawau in the interest of security in the eastern Sabah. The Minister of Transport, Liow Tiong Lai has also proposed to extend the area of ESSCOM and ESSZONE to cover the whole Sabah as also been proposed by Yong Teck Lee. On 23 January 2015, the Royal Brunei Air Force gives neighbouring Malaysia four S-70A Black Hawks as a gift. The Malaysian said that it will use it in addition to available assets to defend Sabah from a further possible attacks by the Moros. On 28 February, the United States supplied the Eastern Sabah Security Command (ESSCOM) with 12 boats following a number of agreements signed between the two countries in 2014 during the Barack Obama visit.

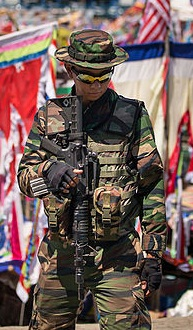
A Malaysian Army soldier armed with Colt M4 standing guard in Sabah east coast as part of the Eastern Sabah Security Command (ESSCOM).

Despite various initiatives and assets been provided by government, the cross border crimes in eastern Sabah are keep increasing as the kidnap-for-ransom groups had strong intelligence as they had a relatives and family living in Sabah. An investigation report in 2017 revealed that some of the militants members caught in Malaysia were even working as security guards or members of the People's Volunteer Corps in the Malaysia's capital city of Kuala Lumpur. The Eastern Sabah Security Command (Esscom) Security Coordinating Intelligence Officer Hassim Justin have previously warned Malaysian employers to be cautious on hiring Filipinos (mainly those who come from the Sulu Archipelago and Mindanao) as they could not be trusted as many of them are believed to be spies of kidnapping groups as shown by police investigation and international media reports. Beside that, he have suggested that if any Filipino races (who have been naturalised as Malaysian citizens through the illegal Project IC) caught for continuously committing crimes in the states should be revoked for their citizenship with their whole family been deported back to the Philippines. Hashim also suggested that any Filipino names in troubled villages with high crime rates in eastern Sabah should be removed and replaced with Sabahan names. Similar view were also being highlighted in 2018 by ESSCOM chief Hazani Ghazali that Filipino kidnappers received information from their relatives who have been illegally staying in Sabah for a long time. The Royal Malaysia Police and Malaysian Deputy Prime Minister has made a proposal to ban barter trade in the east coast as it was seen only benefited to one side and threatening the security of the state. This was enforced then although facing numerous opposition from the Malaysian opposition parties and Filipino resident on the nearest Philippine islands due to the raise of the cost in their region after the ban, while receiving positive welcomes by Sabahans residents and politicians. The barter trade activity was resumed on 1 February 2017 with the increase of security surveillance and enforcement from both Malaysia and the Philippines authorities to jointly secure their borders.

Malaysia, Philippines and Indonesia has agreed to jointly patrol their sea to thwart any threats from the Filipino militants. The three countries also have signed another agreement on joint air patrols. On 2 March 2015, a Filipino worker was arrested following the murder of the former Sabah Chief Minister nephew over salary dispute. On 22 February 2016, four Filipino refugee were arrested following the discovery of a Colt. 45 and 39 bullets in their Isuzu D-Max vehicle at a refugee settlement scheme in Telipok. On 23 September, an undocumented Filipino migrant was arrested together with his daughter after they were found with M16 bullets and magazines at a premises in Sandakan. On 7 October, Malaysian authorities arrest 10 suspects comprising residents of Sabah and individuals from the southern Philippines on suspicion of collaborating with militant groups. On 8 December, three armed Filipino kidnappers who are believed to be members of Abu Sayyaf was shot dead by Malaysian security forces while another two arrested while the gunmen trying to kidnap a fisherman off Lahad Datu. Two other gunmen however managed to escape with one hostage but goes missing after the shootout. Philippine authorities have confirmed all of the gunmen are Abu Sayyaf members and one of the gunmen killed is one of Abu Sayyaf notorious leader that were previously involved in several other kidnappings involving foreign nationals. On 12 December, two armed gunmen was killed during a shootout with police in Kunak. Both suspects are armed with homemade shotguns, an airgun, a Colt .45 pistol, a .38 revolver, a knife and parang, several M16 bullets (a version which different from that being used by the Malaysian security forces), other bullets and cartridges as well drug packets but no documentation found in their bodies. Both suspects are believed to be drug dealers and involved in several robbery around the east coast area. On 29 December, a 42-year-old local man was slashed to death while his wife and their three children were seriously hurt after being attacked by a Filipino man in Kudat.

On 7 January 2017, a paperless Filipino who just served his sentence for 13 criminal offences in Sabah prison in October 2016 was shot and re-arrested by local police after he resisting from arrest and tried to injuring one of the policemen when he was caught return to his criminal activities. On 3 April, a Filipino man was shot to dead by police after running amok by stabbing his wife and tried to injuring policemen who tried to stop him after repeated warnings. Another Filipino man was charged in court for supporting the ideology of Abu Sayyaf terrorist group on 6 April. On 15 April, a local teenager was attacked and stabbed by a group of Filipino migrants in Penampang. On 30 April, a Filipino foreign worker who works for the Malaysian plantation related an incident to a friend which later was reported to police following the sightings of armed men in Lahad Datu who suddenly apprehended him and telling that they want to protect the peoples in Sabah. Following a wide-scale surveillance launched by the security forces, there is however no presence of armed men founded in the related areas with the Filipino man also giving a lot of excuses when asked why it was only reported after two weeks with authorities have warned that severe punishment will be imposed for those who found to be made a false report. The worker explained he was afraid of being arrested if he report the sighting to local authorities as he working illegally in the state, which later resulting to his arrestment with the authorities assured the public that police will not closing the case despite not finding any proof of the man's claim and explained his arrestment are not caused by making false report but rather due to immigration offences.

On 2 May, an unemployed Filipino man was arrested after trying to assault a security guard after being warned not to trespass a construction site. The suspect was managed to be put down by the guard during the ensuing scuffle when he began to brandishing a knife; and giving a threat to find the guard soon after his sentence is ended. The suspect also remanded for coming to the state without any valid travel documents. On 10 May, a local woman was held hostage by a Filipino man high on drugs after the suspect failed to robbed a house which he was then picking a local bystander and pointing his knife towards the woman by threatening to slit her throat. Following the implementation of strict requirements by Philippine authorities in the southern Philippines for Filipinos who tried to leaving their country to come to Sabah, there is a positive beginning drop on the numbers of Filipinos who plan to heading to the state without complete travel documents. This was enforced following the revelation from the previously arrested Filipino man who tried to robbed a house and taking a local bystander as a hostage in the state capital as he had no money to be used to return to his country. On 29 September, a Filipino man who are previously involved in several robberies and kidnapping plot was shot dead after resisting arrest by opening fire towards police. On 13 November, a previously deported Filipino illegal immigrant who had returned to Sabah to commit armed robbery was arrested after robbing a convenience store in Tawau. On 4 December, another Filipino man linked to the Abu Sayyaf was shot dead in the waters near Silam in Lahad Datu after resisting arrest by firing security forces.

On 13 February 2018, a Filipino criminal who has been involved in 17 housebreaking cases were shot dead by police after he resisting arrest by releasing several gunshots to police members during ensuing chase in Kayu Madang Road, Telipok. On 22 February, Sabah fishermen who was fishing in the waters off Kinabatangan was shot by gunmen who are believed to be originated from the neighbouring islands of the Philippines. On 27 February, three heavily armed men was shot dead by police in Tawau after opening fire when the suspects realised they were being tailed. On 8 May, four gunmen were shot dead by Sabah authorities off the coast of Lahad Datu after attacking patrolling authorities. Another two gunmen were shot dead on 20 September. On 24 December, through raids into various Filipino refugee settlement in both Sabah and Labuan, the authorities seized many dangerous weapons including drugs possessed by many of the Filipino illegal immigrants where they were detained through the operations. On 28 December, an armed illegal immigrant man with identity documents from the Philippines were shot dead in Kampung Jawa, Lahad Datu after aiming his gun to patrolling police members who out to check him in a house following a tip-off from the public.

On 13 January 2019, another case of random passerby hostage taking involving a 2-year-old children occurred in Telipok where the suspect been shot dead after 5 hours negotiation with police to release the victim. The identity of the suspect are yet to be ascertained but during the negotiation, the suspect are heard to be speaking Suluk language and police also did not rule out he is a foreigner as no identity document found on his body. This was also agreed by a majority of Sabahan society in social media who have been condemning the unstoppable violent attitudes of Muslim Filipino cultures in the state that are brought by their immigrants since the area of Telipok itself are mostly inhabited by southern Filipinos refugees from Mindanao. United Pasokmomogun Kadazandusun Murut Organisation (UPKO) also warned local authorities on the already huge crimes in the state that were perpetrated by Filipinos in just a month, urging for more drastic measures being taken including recalling and reissued all the identity cards in the state to only genuine Sabahan citizens since many foreigners mainly criminals and terrorists from neighbouring countries have taken advantage through the illegal issuance of identity cards to them. On 26 January, an Aussie homestay operator in Sabah were severely slashed with machete by an undocumented Filipino worker after some disagreement with the latter near Kampung Kiwoi, Tamparuli. The Filipino was then arrested on 14 February in an unnumbered house in Kampung Saga in Likas, Kota Kinabalu where the suspect still tried to escape and being aggressive towards police. Through his trial, he was served a sentence of 13 years in jail.

On 24 May, a local Grab driver who was pronounced missing was later found to be murdered by a Filipino illegal immigrant with local accomplice (also a Filipino with citizenship) in Kota Kinabalu. Both suspects has been arrested and handed with execution. On 10 June, a local trader in Tawau was stabbed to death by Filipino illegal immigrants with all of the perpetrators were later arrested by police. On 11 June, a clash occurred between local and Filipino illegal immigrants in Ranau with a local man was assaulted by the Filipino group. Following the unstoppable spates of violent criminal incidents perpetrated by Filipino illegal immigrants towards local people, Filipino community leader has called for a more strict and harsh law by both Sabah and Malaysian authorities with life travel ban imposed to those involved while at the same time calling Filipino authorities to records every of the ex-convicts and closely monitor their movements upon their return to the Philippines. The city of Kota Kinabalu have since recently received the exodus of beggars from the Philippines wandering around the city and disrupting the public with more efforts from the authorities have also been urged by the State Tourism Minister Christina Liew to address the matter. The Sabah Prisons' Board of Visiting Justices (LHP) also has reported that most prison in the state have exceeded their capacity, with detained Filipinos in Sabah blamed their embassy for their lengthy detention.

A Malaysian lecturer, B. A. Hamzah of the Department of Strategic Studies, National Defence University, Kuala Lumpur said "the root causes for maritime violence must be understood and addressed" with the people in the Sulu Archipelago should be granted for a self-rule by the Philippine government. Adding that the kidnappings was happened as a result of spillover of armed conflicts in the southern Philippines. He said there must be co-operation between the Philippines, Malaysia and Indonesia to enforce law and order at the Sulu Sea as the area are historically known for their lawlessness, where the Muslim islanders living in the archipelago becoming bandits, kidnappers, extortionists, and gun runners as their main primary businesses as the areas are very impoverished.

Neighbouring Vietnam have begun to install radar in their ships for piracy warning and launched maritime exercise. Both Singapore and Thailand have also been invited to assist in the Sulu Sea patrols together with Malaysia, Indonesia and the Philippines.

=== Society ===
The former Prime Minister of Malaysia, Mahathir Mohamad, has suggested the government of Sabah to demolish all the water villages in eastern Sabah and resettle only the local people there as the era of the water villages has passed and the lifestyle of the villagers there who live in the sea is not appropriate for the modern way of life in Malaysia as the nation aims for Vision 2020. A Sabah MP, Rosnah Shirlin has called for the closure of the Filipino refugee camp in Kinarut, saying it is a threat to security in Papar. She says:

The refugee camp has creating a lot of problems for the residents of the district. The camp has become a drugs den and the source of many other criminal activities. Over the years, many robberies had taken place in nearby villages and the culprits are mostly from the camp. Supposedly, the improved situation in the Philippines today has brought into question whether these Filipinos could still be regarded as refugees. The camp was set up on a 40-acre plot of land near Kampung Laut in the early 1980s by the United Nations High Commission for Refugees (UNHCR). But the UNHCR had long ago stopped providing funds to the camp and as a result, many of these foreigners had been working outside the camp. The refugees had dared to expand the camp area, encroaching on nearby village land and today, the camp has become the biggest syabu distribution den in Papar.

— Rosnah Shirlin, Sabah Papar's MP.

United Sabah People's Party (PBRS) leader, Joseph Kurup shares a similar view on this, adding that the Moro refugees and immigrants should take the opportunity to return and develop their homeland in Mindanao, Philippines as the peace had been restored there. Kurup also reminded that Sabahan people are not against to any migration, but stressing that any migration should be accordance to law by not entering illegally;

We (the Sabahan peoples) are not against migration to Sabah as long as it is in accordance with the law.

— Joseph Kurup, United Sabah People's Party (PBRS) leader.

Another Sabah former Chief Minister, Yong Teck Lee has suggested to suspend the ferry service in Sandakan to counter the high level of Moro people migration from the Mindanao which now has become a major issue for Sabah when they overstay in the state and becoming an illegal immigrant. In October 2014, the Minister of Home Affairs, Ahmad Zahid Hamidi announced that all stateless children in Sabah will be given a birth certificates for schooling purposes. The proposal was soon opposed by a number of Sabahan politicians both from the opposition and government allied parties such as Joseph Pairin Kitingan, Darell Leiking and Yong Teck Lee, citing the act would bring a big problem to Sabah in the future, while another Sabah-based opposition party leader, Jeffrey Kitingan, has called for a different birth certificate to be issued to the foreigners. Sabah State Legislative Assembly member for Kamunting in Sandakan, Charles O Pang, believes the education system will be burdened if stateless children are given birth certificates. He quote;

According to Sabah survey of statelessness, it is estimated that around 36,000 stateless children of Indonesian origin lived in the state and most employees understand they are working on palm oil plantations. While stateless children from the Philippines are estimated much higher. He did not deny that most people who come to Sabah to seek a better life but the problems posed by the illegal human wave will only lead to trouble. Obviously, this scenario creates an unfair situation for Malaysians in the sense that we are taxpayers, and who should pay the high costs of the non-citizen children not only in their schools, but also in the terms of maintenance of their lives?

— Charles O Pang, Sabah State Legislative Assembly Members for Kamunting in Sandakan.

Also it was known the UNHCR has ever trying before to integrate the Filipino refugees with local communities in 1986 if they can't repatriate them back to the Philippines but this was opposed heavily by the locals and Sabah state government as it could bring a big social problem to the state. Large amounts of money have been spent to maintain the lives of the Filipino illegal immigrants and the amount remains unpaid until today despite attempts to recover the monies. Sabah Health Department said infectious diseases among the illegal immigrants was on the rise resulting in more expenditures, as well as provisions for more funds to accommodate the logistics such as medical officers and others. Illegal electricity connection and theft in the state are mainly been attributed to illegal squatters settlement that inhabited by Filipino refugees and illegal immigrants. The seaweed industry operated by indigenous Suluk community in eastern Sabah are also heavily affected because of the persistent kidnappings perpetrated by their Filipino-Tausūg relatives southern-Philippine-based terrorist group, the Abu Sayyaf. Sabah Kiulu Assemblyman, Joniston Bangkuai point out a similar view on the stateless issue. He said:

It used to be that they (the illegal Filipinos) came here to look for livelihood. They came to look for work, but now they are multiplying, with their women giving birth to as many as 10 children, but they are not taken care of.

— Joniston Bangkuai, Sabah Kiulu's Assemblyman.

The Sabah National Registration Department (NRD) director, Ismail Ahmad has clarified that the issuing of the birth certificates does not make the stateless children Malaysians or Sabahan citizens as the certificates will be only used for record and monitoring purpose to show that the children are born in Sabah. Beside that, a DNA test is now among the methods being used to ensure only genuine citizens are issued the Malaysian birth certificate when they apply for late birth registrations. After several discussions, the Cabinet of Malaysia later decided to give only special birth documents instead of birth certificates as announced by the Malaysian Prime Minister, Najib Razak.

UPKO to present their proposed solutions on the problems after they have obtained the full Royal Commission Inquiry report, one of them being the re-calling and re-issuing of all the identification cards of the people of Sabah. Other former politicians have asked the federal government to investigate the action of some individuals who claim to be of royal blood of the Sulu Sultanate and have been conferring many Datukship title to local Sabahans and to those from Peninsular Malaysia until today.

Most Sabah United Malays National Organisation (UMNO) leaders have lauded the drastic measures announced by the Sabah current Chief Minister Musa Aman to address the problem posed by illegal immigrants. However, the former UPKO federal parliamentarian, Wilfred Bumburing reminded that the members of Barisan Nasional (BN) should not take credit for the setting up of the Royal Commission of Inquiry (RCI) as it was only established after a much pressure from the Sabahan peoples. The United Sabah Party (PBS) has said the Philippine government is to be blamed for the misery of its nationals in Sabah as a response to remarks made by Philippines Ambassador to Malaysia, J. Eduardo Malaya who stressed that Filipino migrants children in Malaysia deserved formal education. While he support the suggestion, the party Secretary-General Johnny Mositun reminded:

The number of Filipinos in Sabah, legal or illegal, is huge but what has Manila done, or is doing, to see to their education? It was Manila's refusal to establish a Consular Office in Sabah that was making life difficult for the hundreds of thousands of Filipinos in the state and Malaysia had to bear the cost. Nearly half of the patients using Sabah hospitals are mostly Filipinos. For the better part of four decades, the Filipinos in Sabah – refugees, migrant workers and illegal immigrants – have all been denied any substantial services or assistance from the Philippine government. They survive only because the Malaysian Government adheres strictly to international norms and standards of law and human rights. We provide them with jobs, they avail themselves of all our civic amenities, and now it is implied that we should educate their children, too. What next?

— Johnny Mositun, United Sabah Party (PBS) Secretary General.

Other Sabahan leaders such as Darell Leiking agreed and reminded the Philippine government to emulate the Indonesian government's plan by setting up a consulate in Sabah to care for their nationals and set up schools for their children. On a statement, he said:

The Philippine government should accept the fact that Sabah was a sovereign nation and that it needed to set up a consulate in the state for the good of its people. Filipino migrants must be registered to allow them to have better opportunities in Sabah, to have a life and proper jobs as it was unfair to impose Filipino problems unto Sabah or the Malaysian government simply because the Philippine government refused to take responsibility for its own people.

— Darell Leiking, member of the opposition (PKR).

The Sabah state government has since working to end the Filipino squatter problems that have become the main cause for rampant crimes, terrorism and drug trafficking in the state by relocating them to a proper place to ease proper management. Prior to the meeting between Philippine President Rodrigo Duterte and Malaysian Prime Minister Najib Razak in Putrajaya in late 2016, both leaders agree to deport illegal Filipino migrants and refugees in Sabah while set aside Philippines claim into the state with the signing of various agreements to improve the social conditions of legal Filipino migrants and expatriates in the state with the establishment of a school, hospital and a consulate. However, the matter will still need to be discussed within the Sabah state cabinet for an outcome to allow Philippine government setting up their school, hospital and a consulate in the state, with the Sabah state government appreciating Philippine government recent move to accept its citizens that currently being detained in various temporary detention in the state mainly for illegal migration, overstaying and committing crimes. According to a statistics from Sabah National Security Council, around 550,000 undocumented immigrants have been deported from the state or left voluntarily since 1990, with most of them are Filipinos. The Sabah state government also submit recommendations to the Malaysian federal government through the Main Committee on Management of Foreigners to move the refugee placement schemes in the state to other more suitable locations far from the towns and industrial development areas. More strong enforcements against illegal immigrants in Sabah also being taken following the discovery of immigrants syndicates giving illegal citizenship to their fellow relatives from the Philippines and Indonesia, as in early 2017, a former employee in the Malaysian Registration Department (JPN) was sentenced to 156 years in prison for giving illegal citizenship to Filipino illegal immigrants from Sulu to stay in Sabah. The recent Sabah state government decision to re-open border trade in its eastern coast has been applauded by Mindanao Development Authority (MinDA) secretary Abdul Khayr Alonto. In his statement:

As per announcement by the chief Minister of Sabah, starting 1 February 2017, the ban on doing the economic activities will be lifted. Sabah is open once again to our Muslim/Filipino traders going to that part of Malaysia. The re-opening of the cross border trade will involve our three island provinces but will eventually expand to other territories of the Autonomous Region in Muslim Mindanao (ARMM), and even to General Santos City. The behaviour of some individuals, you know – kidnapping and beheading – the inhumanity in this kidnap for ransom affected not only the free trade but economic activities, their livelihood (mainly to us). Without prejudice to the Sabah claim, we will operate (consulate) in Kota Kinabalu, within that complex also we will try to put up the consular office activities to take good care of our people in Sabah and attend to their requirements, including passport.

— Abdul Khayr Alonto, Secretary of Mindanao Development Authority (MinDA).

The secretary added that he vowed to work harder to make Mindanao as the gateway of the Philippines as part of the BIMP-EAGA and asked the Armed Forces of the Philippines (AFP) to strengthened security in the Sulu Sea and Mindanao and eliminating terrorists to encourage more investors to develop the areas. However, according to Philippine Representative from Palawan Jose C. Alvarez, they are more interest to establish a Palawan Business Office in the state than Philippine Office that will also giving the similar services like passport granting, renewal of travel documents and other requirements as well extending business assistance to the Filipino people when the need arises, giving excuses that it is only proper and logical to set up the main office if there are increasing number of Filipino traders especially from Palawan. Despite this, Abdul Khayr said the opening of a consulate is still a major necessary to serve as a refuge for overseas Filipino workers who vulnerable to many issues especially those who remain undocumented and by opening it does not mean it will affect the territorial dispute issue.

The Filipinos in the state expressed their hopes that more attention will be given from the Filipino consular services especially on easy and better access in communication facilities, more friendly attitude from embassy officials and staff and transparency in all official transactions as they had repeatedly expressed their dissatisfactions over how the manner of consular missions were conducted with the presence of "middlemen", delays in deliveries of travel documents, difficulties to telephone the main Philippine embassy in Kuala Lumpur and rudeness of some of the embassy officials and staff. Despite the return of barter trade activity, the state of Sabah has maintained they will always be cautious on their trade with the Philippines.

In 2019, the IMM13 document for refugees from southern Philippines are being replaced with Temporary Sabah Pass (PSS) under the administration of a new Malaysian government to solve the problems once and for all which have been ongoing since the 1970s where the old document is misused by the refugees which subsequently posing threats to the security of the state. The Sabah state government also introducing a new barter trade system where only non-subsidised cooking oil can be used in the trade unlike in the previous system where subsidised cooking oil specifically for Malaysian citizens were rampantly taken by foreigners in neighbouring Philippines and Indonesia. Despite with all of the earlier proposals and newer approaches, the increasing Filipino netizens pressure on the Philippine government to act more on territorial issues due to the government soft approaches to recent presence of China's military in their territorial waters was responded by Philippine Foreign Affairs Secretary Teodoro Locsin Jr. who subsequently trying to divert the attention by saying in April 2019 that the Philippine government should make the attempt to possessing Sabah as the main priority instead while telling everyone through his tweet in Twitter that the South China Sea (known as West Philippine Sea in the country) is not Philippine territories where it is only an exclusive economic zone (EEZ). Further in September in the same year, Locsin finally revealed the definite Philippine government decision that they really did not have any plan to setting up an embassy to care for Filipino nationals in the state who frequently detained due to social problems as the move is considered by the Philippine government as an act of treason to their country, ignoring the plead of many Filipinos who have been complaining the problems on the lacks of their representative in the state unlike neighbouring Indonesia which has a consulate in the state.
