= Adal =

Adal may refer to:

- A short form for Germanic names in aþala- (Old High German adal-), "nobility, pedigree"; see Othalan
  - Adál Maldonado (1948–2020), Puerto Rican artist
  - Adal Ramones (born 1969), Mexican television show host
  - Adal Hernandez (born 1973), American tattoo artist
- Adal Island, Malaysia
- Scandinavian Ådal (Old Norse Árdalr), "river valley":
  - Ådal, valley and former municipality in Buskerud county, Norway
  - Illerup Ådal, archeological site in Denmark
- Arabic عدل ʿadl, "justice":
  - Adal (historical region), former geographic region in Northeast Africa
  - Adal Sultanate (عدل), former sultanate in Northeast Africa
    - The Arabic name of Awdal, a region in northwestern Somaliland
    - Adal (sheep), breed of sheep from Ethiopia
    - FC Adal Asmara, football team from Eritrea
  - Adal, Iran (عادل), a village in the Lorestan Province
- Adal was a political party in Kazakhstan.
