= Lahad Datu Airport =

Airport in Sabah, Malaysia

Lahad Datu Airport Lapangan Terbang Lahad Datu
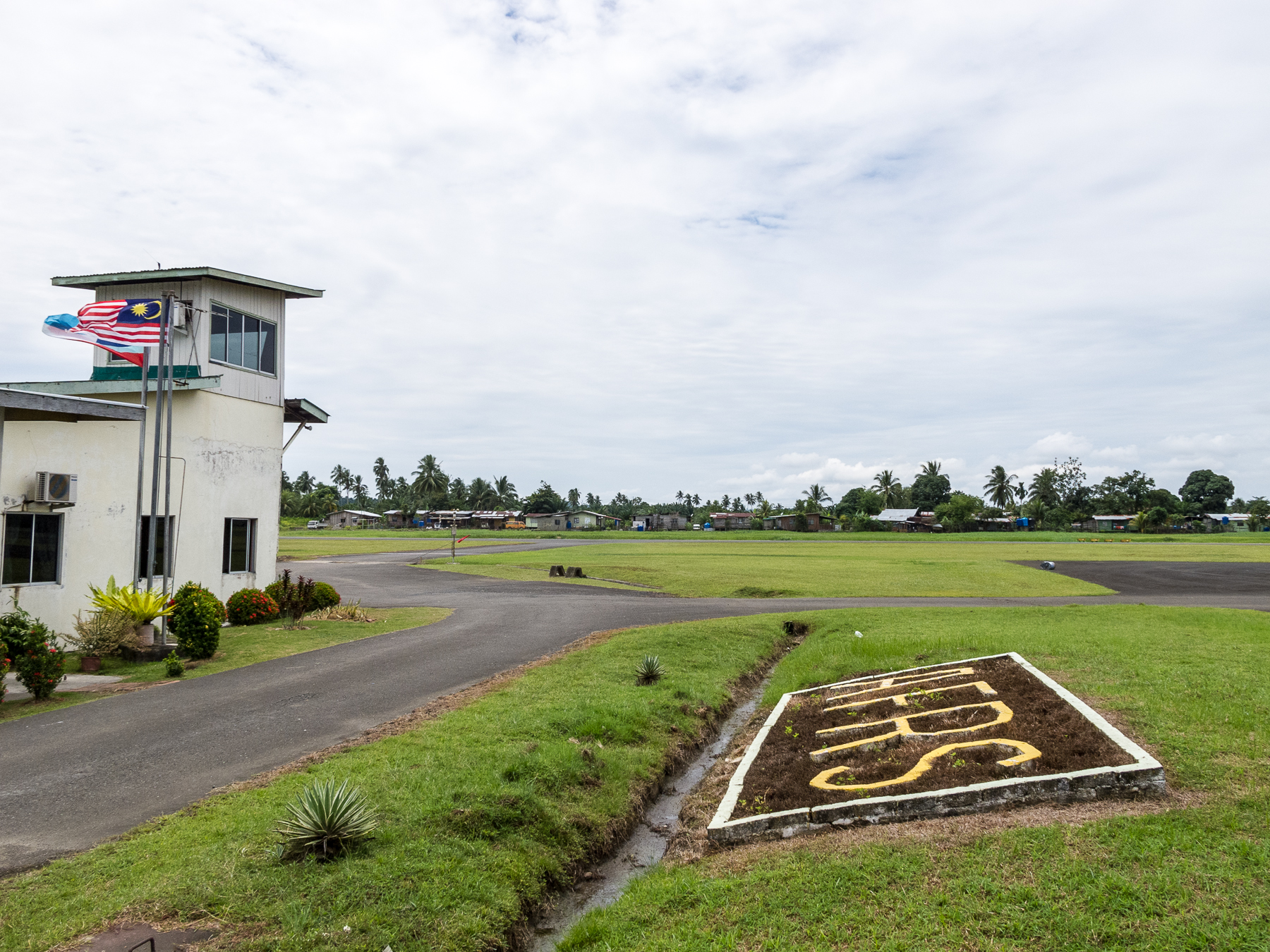
- IATA: LDU; ICAO: WBKD

Summary
- Airport type: Public
- Owner: Government of Malaysia
- Operator: Malaysia Airports Holdings Berhad
- Serves: Lahad Datu District
- Location: Lahad Datu, Sabah, Malaysia
- Time zone: MST (UTC+08:00)
- Elevation AMSL: 48 ft (15 m)
- Coordinates: 05°01′59″N 118°19′16″E

Maps
- Sabah state In Malaysia

- Location in Lahad Datu, Sabah, East Malaysia LDU/WBKD (East Malaysia) LDU/WBKD (Malaysia) LDU/WBKD (Southeast Asia) LDU/WBKD (Asia)

Runways
Direction	Length		Surface
Direction	m	ft	Surface
11/29	1,371	4,498	Asphalt

Statistics (2020)
- Passenger: 59,739 (▼57.5%)
- Airfreight (tonnes): 163 (▲115.5%)
- Aircraft movements: 2,632 (▼44.2%)
- Sources: official web site AIP Malaysia

Lahad Datu Airport (IATA: LDU, ICAO: WBKD) is an airport located in the southeastern part of the Malaysian state of Sabah. The airport, which is situated approximately 1 km (0.62 mi) from downtown Lahad Datu, serves the town of Lahad Datu and its neighbouring districts such as Kinabatangan, FELDA Sahabat, and Kunak. The airport can accommodate aircraft as large as the ATR72, and the terminal building can handle up to 100,000 passengers annually. In 2016, the airport handled 140,077 passengers and 3,713 aircraft movements.

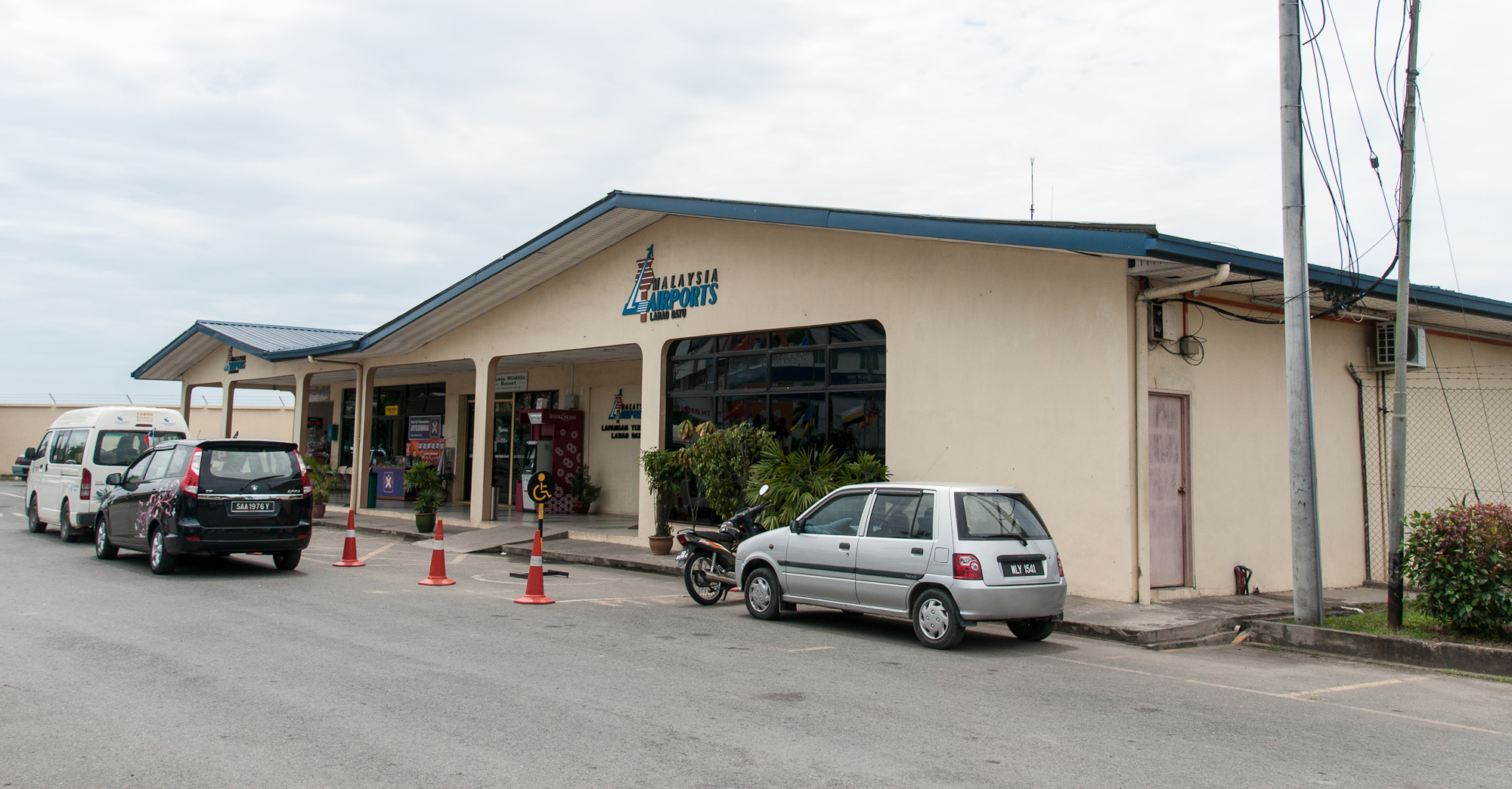
The airport's front entrance

== Present ==
Currently the airport has basic facilities and amenities to facilitate turboprop aircraft operations. However no radar or Atc services are available with radio positioning feedback to be liaise directly with Kota Kinabalu FIR. All approaches are conducted visually with the airport usually closed by sunset. Depending on the weather condition, the usual cut off time is 6.20pm / 1820 hrs. The apron at the terminal is also configured to take in two turboprop aircraft such as the Fokker 50 and ATR 72. However, there is no refuelling facility present at this airport.

The airport also has a military hangar constructed. The hangar operates as a forward base for the Malaysia civil defense and military of malaysia under Eastern Sabah Security Command. Build for Helicopter operations the hangar supports Medium-lift heli operations.

== Airlines and destinations ==
Airlines	Destinations
AirBorneo	Kota Kinabalu, Sandakan

== Traffic and statistics ==
=== Traffic ===
Annual passenger numbers and aircraft statistics
Year	Passengers handled	Passenger % Change	Cargo (tonnes)	Cargo % Change	Aircraft Movements	Aircraft % Change
2011	131,054	Steady	42	Steady	3,024	Steady
2012	142,733	▲8.9	185	▲340.5	3,147	▲4.1
2013	145,930	▲2.2	200	▲8.1	4,215	▲33.9
2014	161,230	▲10.5	179	▼10.5	4,055	▼3.1
2015	143,654	▼10.9	158	▼11.7	3,929	▼3.1
2016	140,077	▼2.5	129	▼18.4	3,713	▼5.5
2017	127,651	▼8.9	101	▼21.7	3,199	▼13.8
2018	124,803	▼2.2	97	▼4.0	3,135	▼2.0
2019	140,583	▲12.6	75	▼22.7	4,718	▲50.5
2020	59,739	▼57.5	163	▲115.5	2,632	▼44.2
^{Source: Malaysia Airports Holdings Berhad}
