= Eastern Sabah Security Zone =

Security zone in Sabah, Malaysia

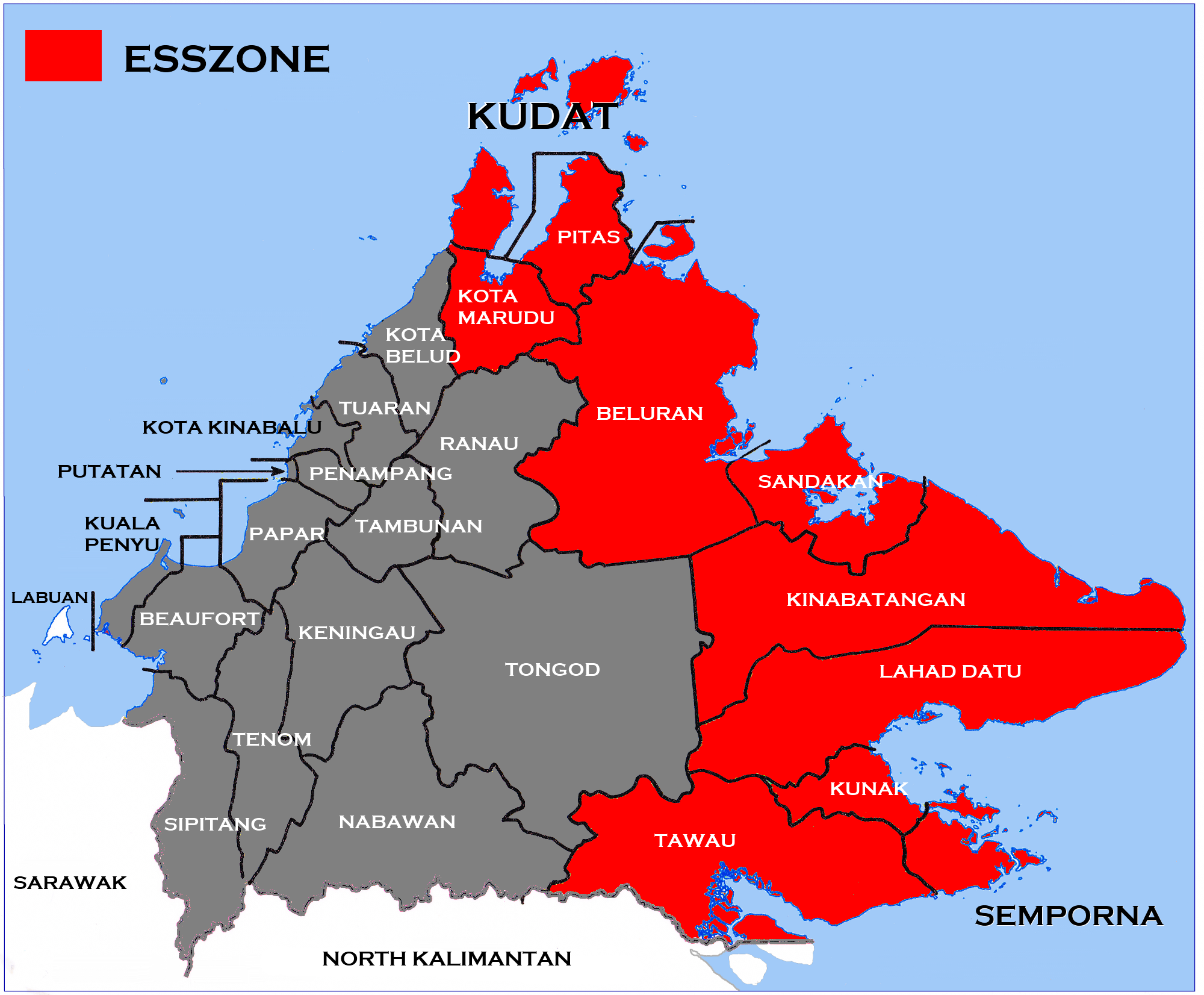
ESSZONE area

The Eastern Sabah Security Zone (ESSZONE) is a security zone in the Malaysian state of Sabah that was launched by Malaysian Prime Minister Najib Razak on 25 March 2013 following persistent attacks by pirates and militants from the southern Philippines that occurred in the eastern part of Sabah especially after the 2013 Lahad Datu standoff. It includes the districts of Kudat, Kota Marudu, Pitas, Beluran, Sandakan, Kinabatangan, Lahad Datu, Kunak, Semporna and Tawau (including Kalabakan), which is neighbouring to the Philippines.

The Eastern Sabah Security Command (ESSCOM) is the main enforcement authority for ESSZONE, chaired by Datuk Seri Musa Aman. The Malaysian Government has embarked on a programme to significantly upgrade the land, sea and air defence capabilities of the Malaysian Armed Forces in ESSZONE.

== Scope of works ==
=== Land ===
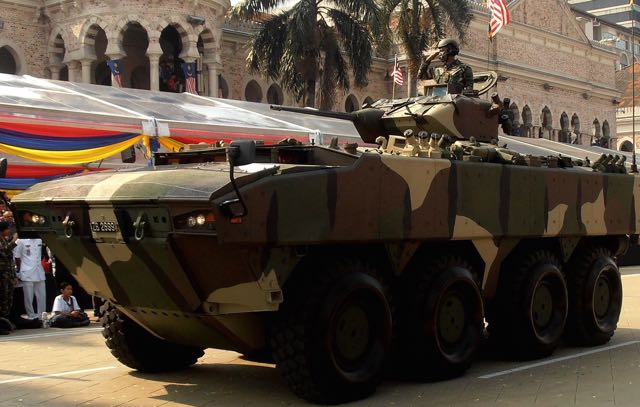
AV8 Gempita armoured fighting vehicle. 12 units are currently deployed in Tawau.

Police Force and Stations: Seven police stations will be established in the zone and five battalions of security forces with a General Operations Force (GOF) brigade will also be placed. The government has also approved an initial allocation of RM200 million to build infrastructure.

Infantry and New Base Camps: In October 2014, the Malaysian Government announced that ESSCOM will be given a budget allocation of RM660 million (USD200 million). Amongst other things, this will fund the addition of one battalion of the General Operations Force (GOF) and one battalion of the army with 1,280 personnel and the construction of two new base camps: the GOF 20th Battalion Camp in Beluran and the Malaysian Armed Forces Camp in Lahad Datu.

Mechanised Infantry: 18 ACV-300 Adnan infantry fighting vehicle have been deployed in Kota Belud and 12 AV8 Gempita armoured fighting vehicle are in Tawau. There are also AV4 Lipanbara armoured personnel carrier stationed in Sabah. Up to 24 M109 howitzer (Paladin) are expected to be sent to Sabah, after a recent agreement with the United States to acquire 30 units of these self-propelled howitzers but this plan has been cancelled.

=== Sea ===
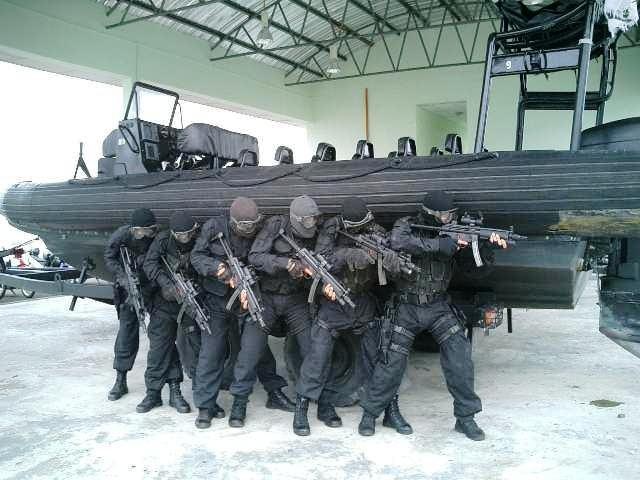
PASKAL operatives are stationed at Lahad Datu.

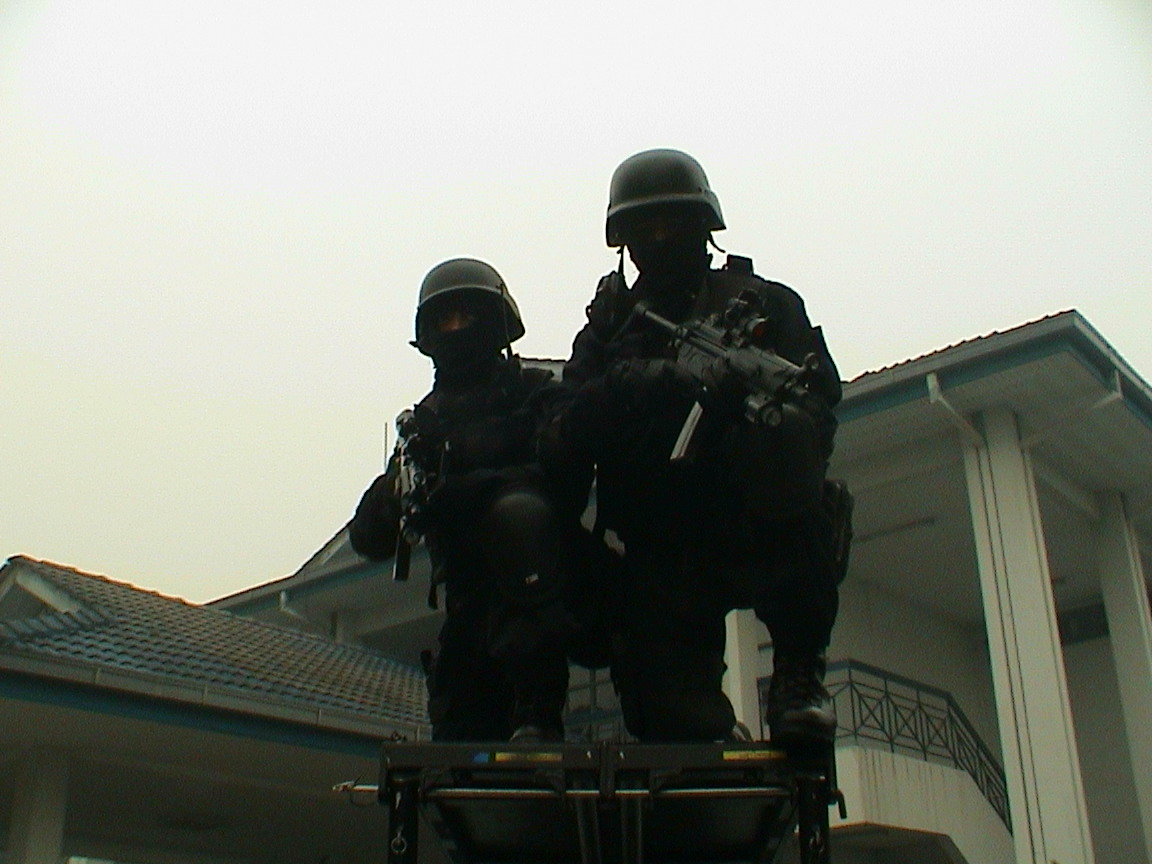
PGK operators are stationed at forward operating bases in Mabul Island, Semporna and Banggi Island, Kudat.

Mobile Seabases: There are currently 2 mobile sea bases:

1. The Bunga Mas Lima, which is an auxiliary support ship, has a crew of 70 and is equipped with interceptor boats and a helipad capable of handling large helicopters like the Eurocopter EC725. A PASKAL quick reaction force team is stationed on this ship
2. The Tun Azizan, a auxiliary vessel (named in honour of the late Tun Azizan Zainul Abidin, former President of Petronas) which was converted into a sea base ship. It has a crew of 99 and is equipped with accommodation facilities, an operations and communication room, air conditioning, fresh water system and military equipment. The Tun Azizan is placed five nautical miles from the Southern Philippines to intercept, with its quick reaction forces, criminals attempting to escape to the Philippines.

Permanent Seabase: A decommissioned oil rig has been retrofitted into a permanent sea base, which is named after the late Tun Sharifah Rodziah, third wife of the late Tunku Abdul Rahman Putra Al-Haj, the first Prime Minister of Malaysia.

Island Forward Operating Bases: Two island forward operating bases are being set up in Pulau Mabul, Semporna and Pulau Banggi, Kudat. Costing RM25 million each, both bases will host quick reaction forces comprising 69 Commandos and UTK special operations force.

Patrol Boats: Thirty new bullet-proof Rigid Hull Fender Boats, costing approximately RM50 million in total, have been in service in ESSZONE since mid-2014. These boats are equipped with advanced specifications and high-end systems, such as forward looking infra red (FLIR) night vision capabilities. The marine police force will acquire a total of 200 boats in stages, with 100 already in service or on order as at September 2015.

=== Air ===
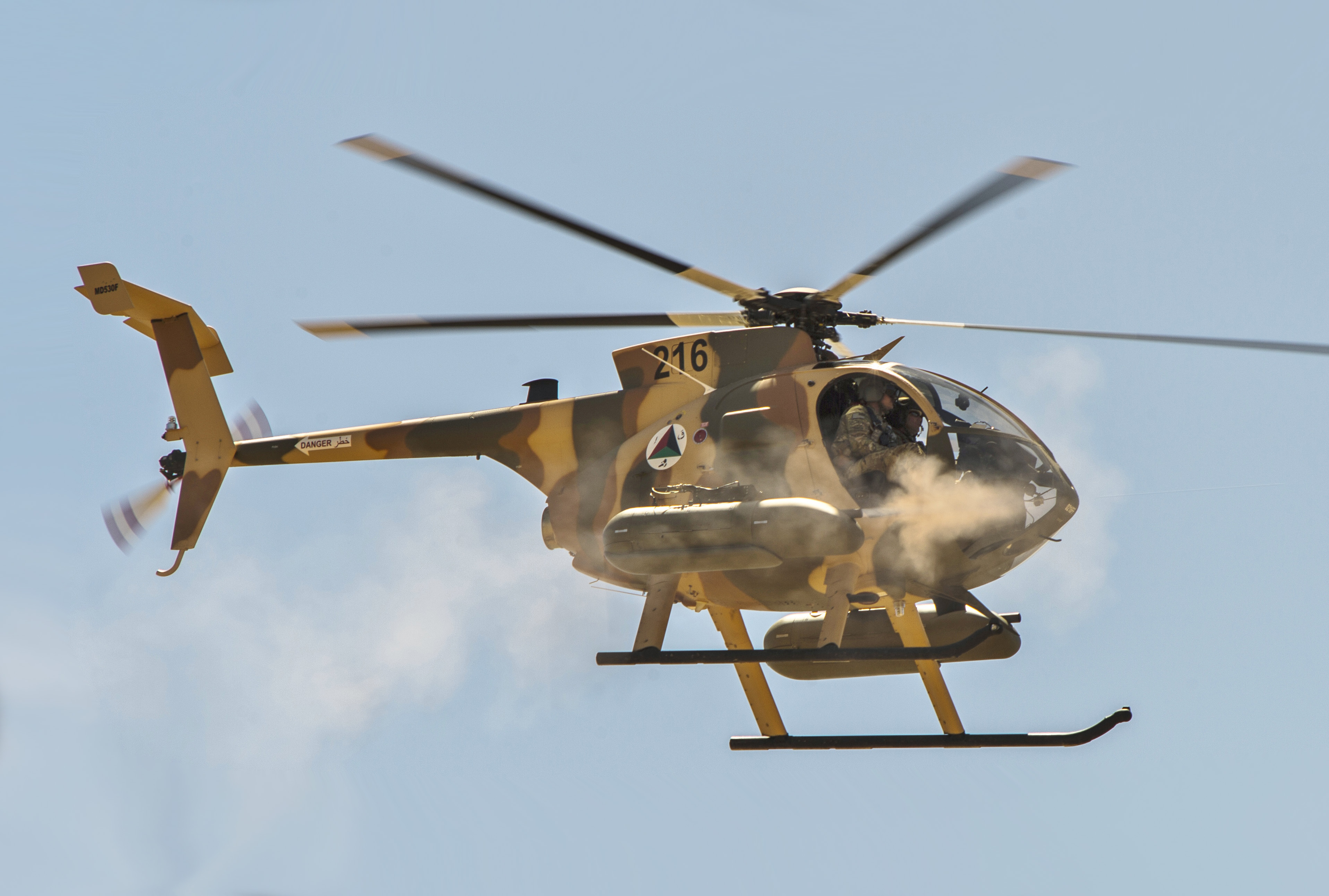
A MD-530G Scout Attack Helicopter. Six have been purchased for the Malaysian Army Air Corp's use in ESSZONE.

Lahad Datu Airport: To provide better air logistical, surveillance and attack capabilities, the runway at the Lahad Datu airport will be upgraded to enable high-capacity aircraft to land. In addition, RM90 million helicopter forward operating base will be built which will have a shelter and apron capable of accommodating 6 helicopters. It will also serve as a transit and operational centre to support the armed forces in their operations, particularly those involving helicopters.

Hawk Fighters: Five Hawk fighter jets have been based in Labuan.

Attack Helicopters: Six armed scout attack helicopters, the MD-530G, will be delivered between Sept 2016 to March 2017. The Malaysian Army's Air Corp will be the launch customer of these new helicopters, which have a top speed of 240 km/h and will be installed with advanced avionics, forward looking infrared sensor, guided and unguided rockets, and inboard .50 caliber machine guns.

Four S-70A Blackhawk helicopters will be transferred from the Royal Brunei Air Force to the Malaysian Armed Forces in November 2016, which Malaysia will update and weaponise before deploying to ESSZONE.

Gatling Guns: 10 sets of M134D Hybrid Gatling Machine Guns will be purchased to arm helicopters. In a January 2015 media statement, the Malaysian Defence Minister announced that five S-61A-4 Nuri helicopters have been fitted with Gatling guns and five Eurocopter EC725 were being fitted with FNMAG 58 7.62 mm general purpose machine guns.

=== Others ===
Coastal Surveillance Systems (CSS) - A network of 13 radar coastal surveillance systems is being installed from Pulau Banggi to Tawau, with 8 already in operation. This network is controlled from the Armed Forces' joint base in Tawau. Five state-of-the-art Airbus SPEXER 2000 Coastal radars, with an instrumented range of approximately 250 km, will be installed in 2016. These sophisticated radars are able to track very small and slowly moving objects such as swimmers and also fast objects such as speed boats.

Aerostats - Floating balloon aerostats surveillance systems will be acquired to provide ESSZONE forces with 24/7 maritime domain awareness capability. Equipped with radar and Electro-Optical Infrared (EOIR) day/night cameras, these aerostats will enable the security forces to more quickly detect the small wooden boats used by criminals to travel into Sabah from the Southern Philippines.

== See also ==
- Eastern Sabah Security Command (ESSCOM)
