= HMS Dido =

Seven ships of the British Royal Navy have been named HMS Dido, after Dido, the legendary founder and queen of Carthage.

- HMS Dido (1784) was a 28-gun sixth-rate launched in 1784 and sold in 1817.
- HMS Dido (1836) was an 18-gun corvette launched in 1836, used as a coal hulk after 1860, and sold in 1903. Designed by Symonds and built at Pembroke. Took part in Syrian war of 1840 and Chinese war of 1842. In Pacific 1855. Became a coal-hulk at Sheerness and was sold in 1903.
- HMS Dido was to have been a wooden screw-propelled corvette. Laid down on 14 January 1861, construction was cancelled on 12 December 1863.
- HMS Dido (1869) was a wooden Eclipse-class screw corvette launched in 1869, hulked in 1886, renamed HMS Actaeon in 1906 and sold in 1922.
- HMS Dido (1896) was an Eclipse-class second class cruiser launched in 1896, used as a depot ship after 1913 and sold in 1926.
- HMS Dido (37) was a Dido-class light cruiser, launched on 18 July 1939 and broken up in 1958.
- HMS Dido (F104) was a Leander-class frigate launched in 1961. She was sold to the Royal New Zealand Navy in 1983 and was renamed HMNZS Southland. She was decommissioned in 1995 and scrapped at Goa in India.

== Battle honours ==
Ships named Dido have earned the following battle honours:

- Minerve 1795
- Egypt 1801
- Syria 1840
- China 1842
- Crete 1941
- Sirte 1942
- Mediterranean 1942–44
- Malta Convoys 1942
- Sicily 1943
- Salerno 1943
- Aegean 1943
- Anzio 1944
- South France 1944
- Arctic 1944

== See also ==
- HMS Didon (1805) was a 38-gun fifth rate frigate captured from the French in 1805 and broken up in 1811.
