= Eastern Sabah Security Command =

Malaysian maritime security area

- Kawasan Keselamatan Khas Pantai Timur Sabah
- Part of National Security Council
- Lahad Datu, Sabah, Malaysia
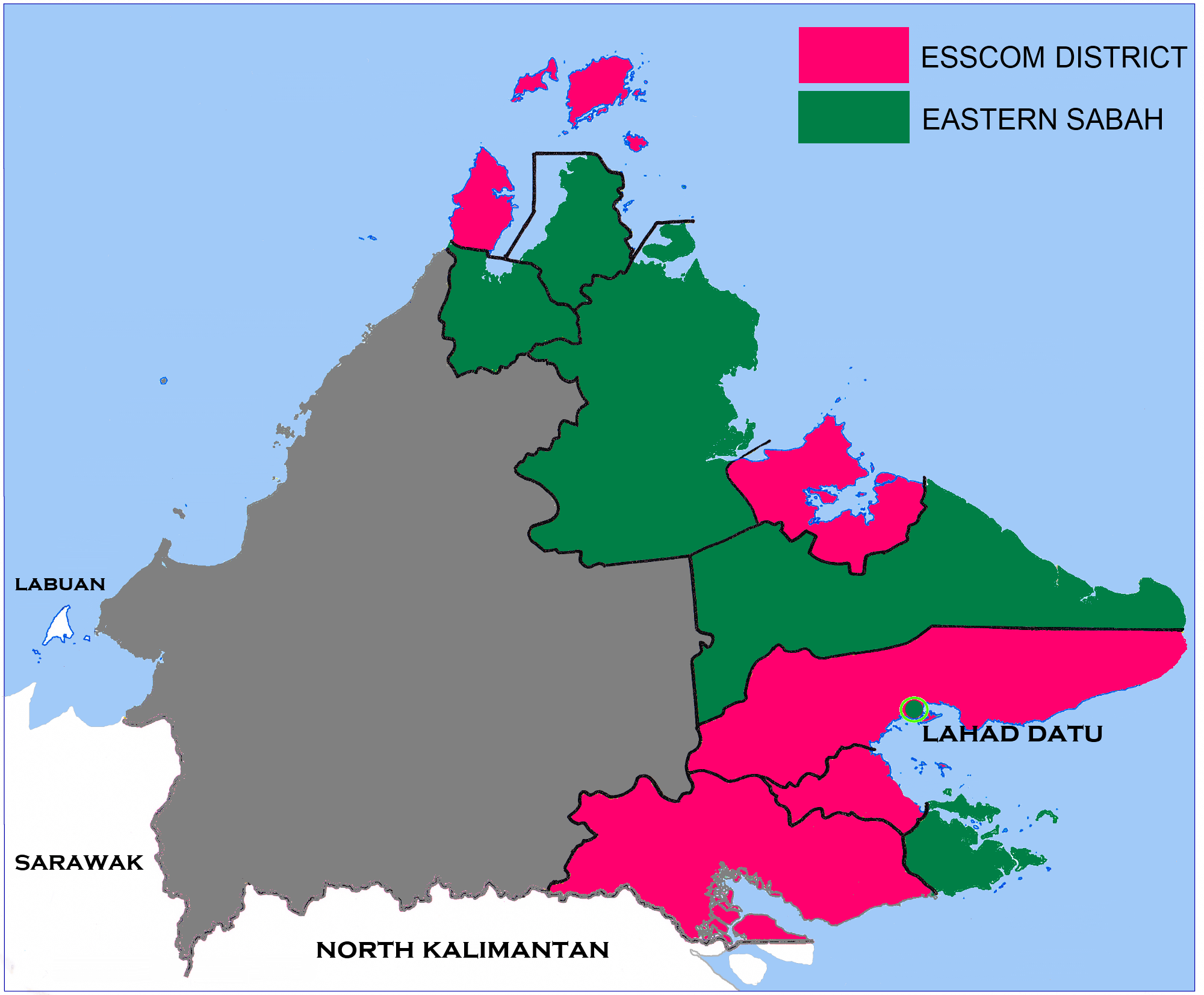
- ESSCOM area.

Site information
- Type: Security Command of Eastern Sabah Area
- Owner: Government of Malaysia
- Controlled by: Joint operations of Malaysian Armed Forces; Royal Malaysia Police and Malaysian Maritime Enforcement Agency

Site history
- Built: 2013
- In use: 2013–present
- Battles/wars: 2013 Lahad Datu standoff Cross border attacks in Sabah

Garrison information
- Current commander: DCP Datuk Victor Sanjos (Since Jun 2023)
- Garrison: Headquarters: Lahad Datu Area districts: Kudat; Sandakan; Lahad Datu; Kunak; Tawau

The Eastern Sabah Security Command (ESSCOM) is a Malaysian security area that covers 1,400 km of the east coast of Sabah from Kudat to Tawau. It was established by Malaysian Prime Minister Dato' Seri Najib bin Abdul Razak and was announced on 7 March 2013 by Musa Aman, the Sabah State Chief Minister. Its purpose is to strengthen maritime security in the eastern part of Sabah following the persistent attacks by pirates and militants in the southern Philippines especially after the 2013 Lahad Datu standoff, while at the same time ensuring that trade and business activity are not affected. The ESSCOM headquarters and main base is currently located in Lahad Datu.

On 8 July 2014, then-Prime Minister Najib Tun Razak announced the restructuring of the ESSCOM with the setting up of two major components - security and defence management as well as enforcement and public action.

== Scope ==
ESSCOM is the authoritative body that oversees Eastern Sabah Security Zone (ESSZONE), which comprises the districts of Kudat, Kota Marudu, Pitas, Beluran, Sandakan, Kinabatangan, Lahad Datu, Kunak, Semporna and Tawau. The body is chaired by the Chief Minister of Sabah, assisted by a CEO appointed by the government. ESSCOM's primary initiative is the establishment of new police stations to further improve security.

== Visits ==
On 9 June 2014, around 20 students from the Royal College of Defence Studies (RCDS) visited ESSCOM headquarters to know the concept of the security area, particularly its integrated operations involving various agencies as well as procedures in dealing with challenges and issues that arise. The delegation was led by Major General Sir Sebastian John Lechmere Roberts along with other 19 senior military officers and civilians from various countries including Sudan, Lebanon, Italy, Estonia, Egypt, Ghana, Afghanistan, India, Pakistan, Kenya and the United Kingdom. On 25 August 2016, four Japanese delegates from the Japan Terrorism Prevention Unit also visited ESSCOM.

== Director-General ==
The Director-General of ESSCOM is selected on a rotational basis.

Name	Former Position	Take office	Out Office	Time in office	Note
Datuk Mohammad Mentek	Sabah immigration department director	01/04/2013	07/08/2014	1 year	1st Sabahan, East Malaysian and non police officer appointed as Esscom commander
Datuk Abdul Rashid Harun	Police, Internal Security and Public Order, former Pasukan Gerakan Khas VAT69 commander.	08/08/2014	22/12/2015	1 year	He was then transferred and appointed as Sabah police commissioner before he retired in 2017
Datuk Wan Abdul Bari Wan Abdul Khalid	Kuala Lumpur police contingent Public Order Department head	23/12/2015	18/07/2017	2 years	
Datuk Hazani Ghazali	Special Actions Unit Commander, Royal Malaysian Police	19/07/2017	04/09/2020	3 years	He was later appointed as Internal and Public Order Security Department director in late 2020
DCP Dato Ahmad Fuad Othman	Sarawak Brigade, General Operations Force Commander	05/09/2020	11/12/2021	1 year	
DCP Ahmad Hamzah	Federal Reserve Unit Commander	12/12/2021	17/05/2023	1 year, 5 months and 5 days	Transferred to Narcotics Criminal Investigation Department, Bukit Aman
DCP Mohd Ali Tamby	Special Actions Unit (Malaysia) & Chief of Staff, Special Forces unit, Esscom	18/05/2023	10/06/2023	1 month	
DCP Victor Sanjos	Deputy Kelantan state police chief	11/06/2023 (acting) & 03/07/2023 (official duty)-now		1 year	2nd East Malaysian and Sabahan commander as of 2023

== See also ==
- Eastern Sabah Security Zone (ESSZONE)
