= Lahad Datu =

- Town and district capital
- Bandar Lahad Datu; Lahad Datu Town

Other transcription(s)
  - Jawi: لحد داتو
  - Chinese: 拿笃 (Simplified) 拿篤 (Traditional); Nádǔ (Hanyu Pinyin)
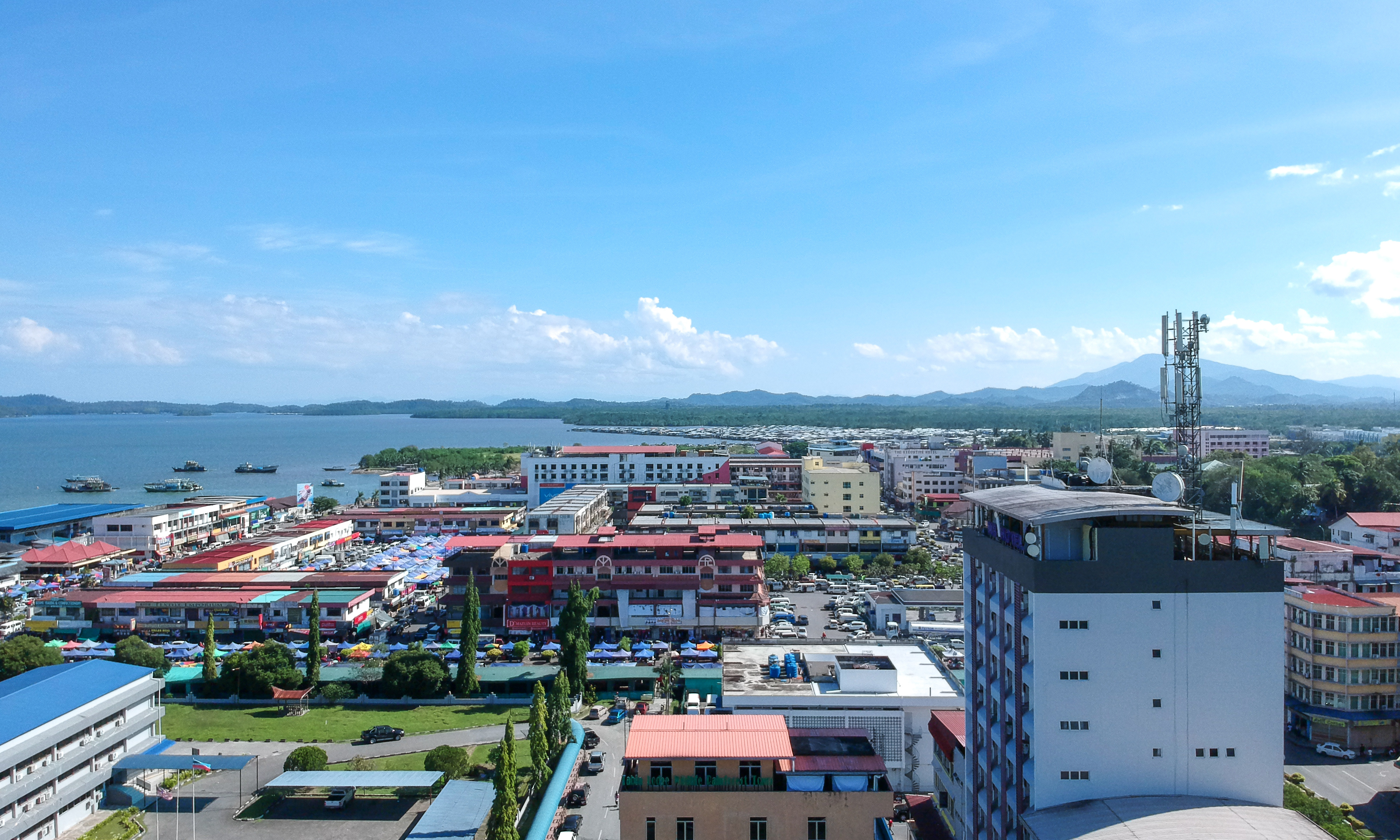
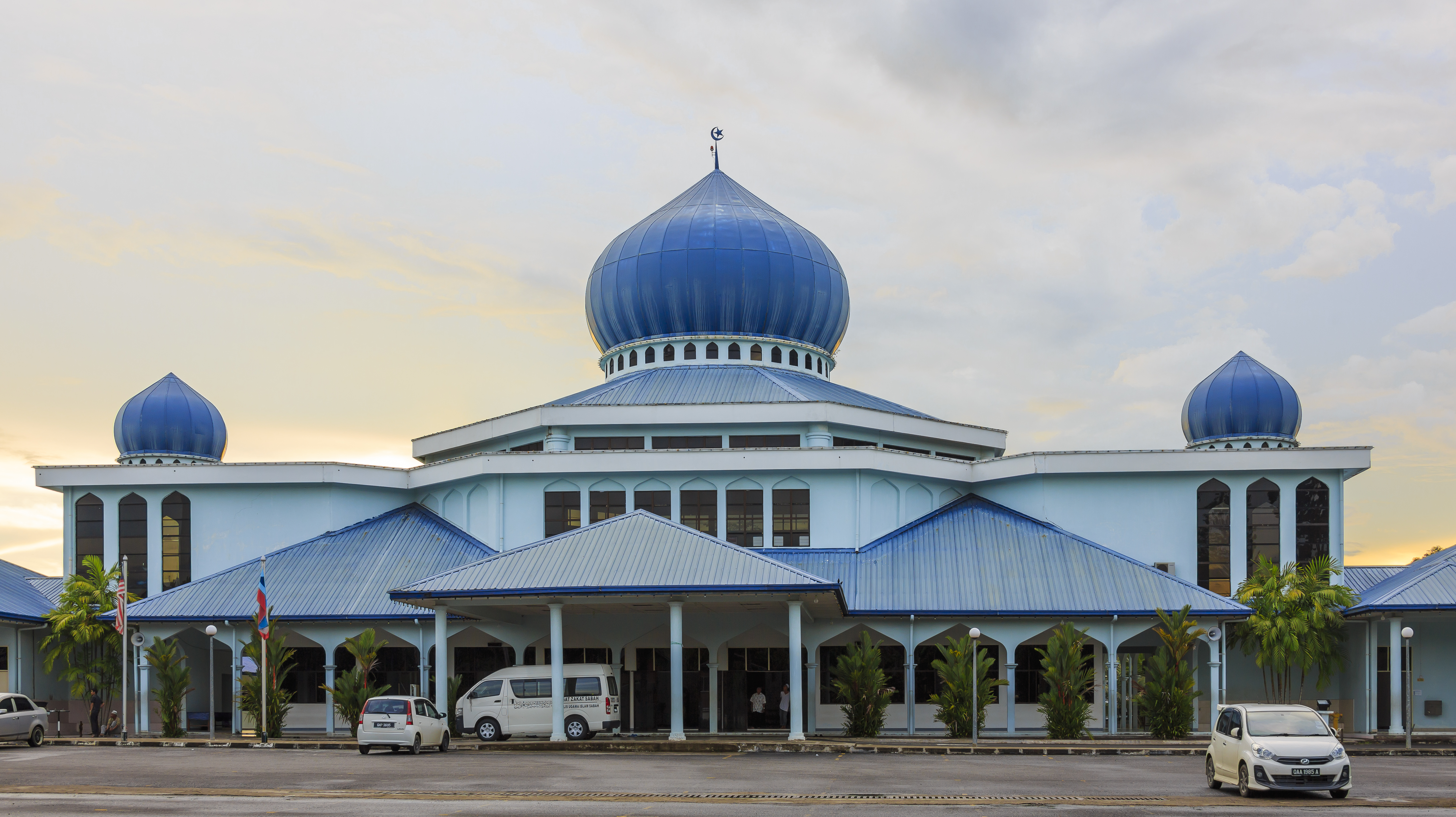
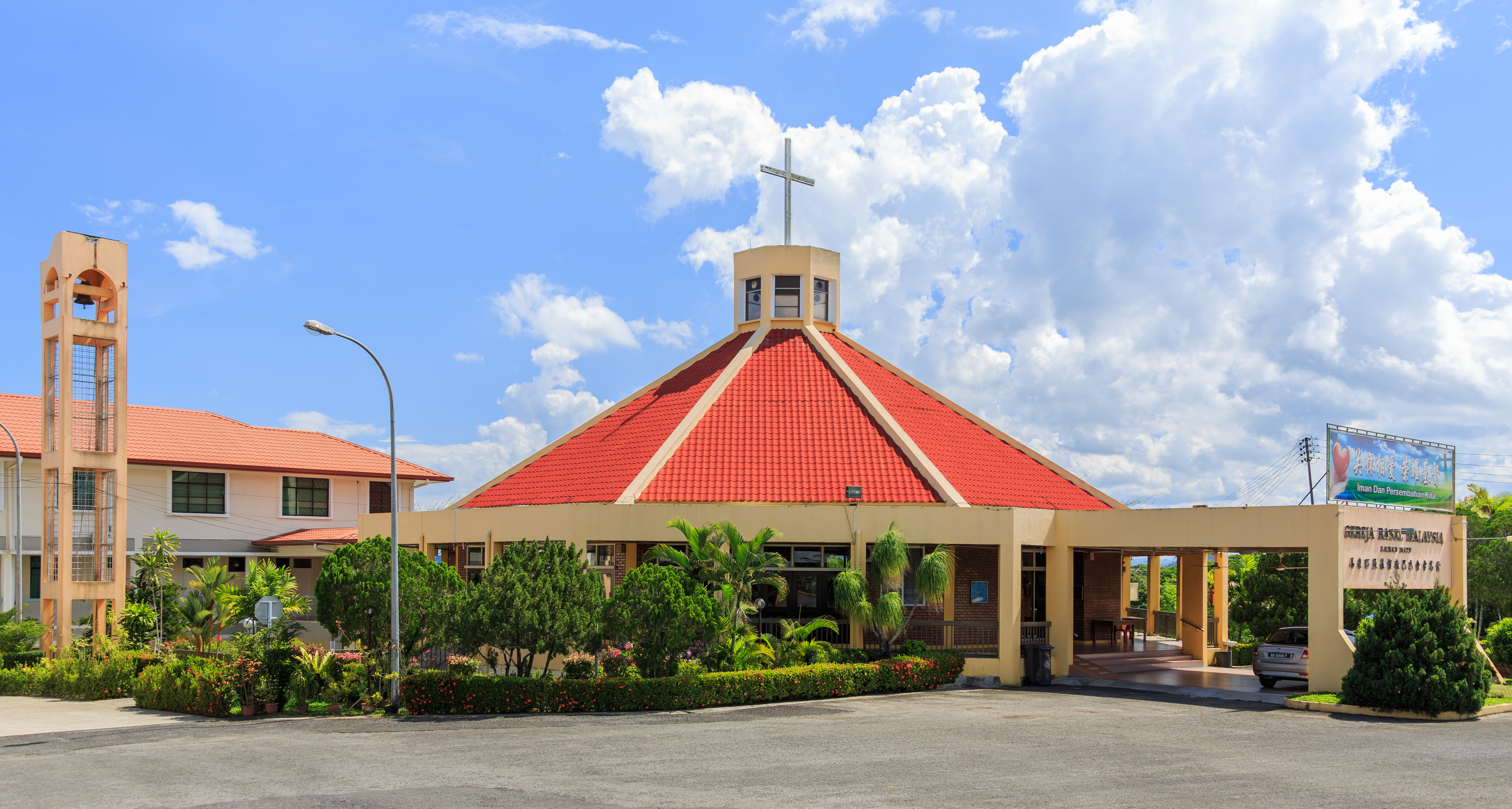
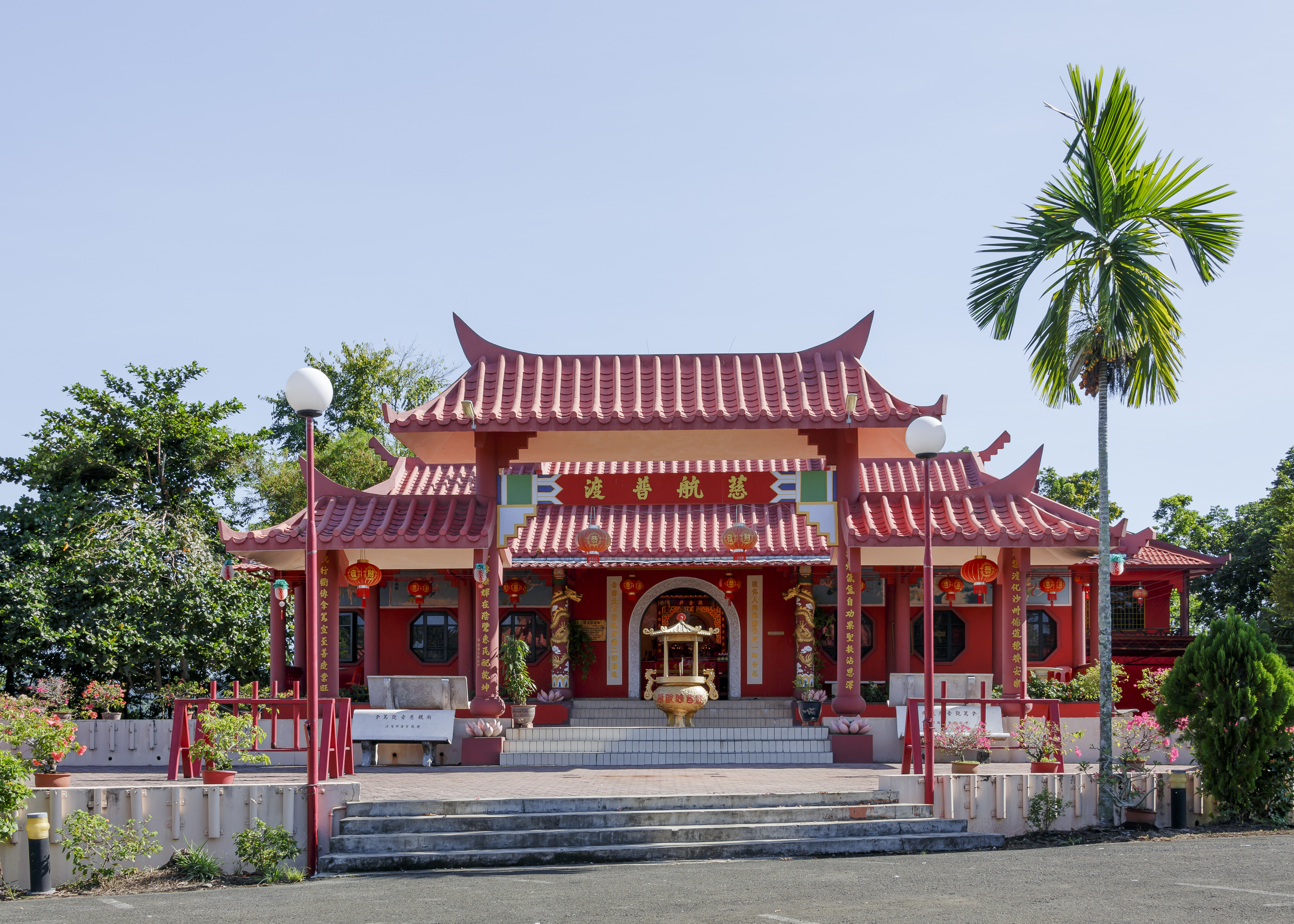
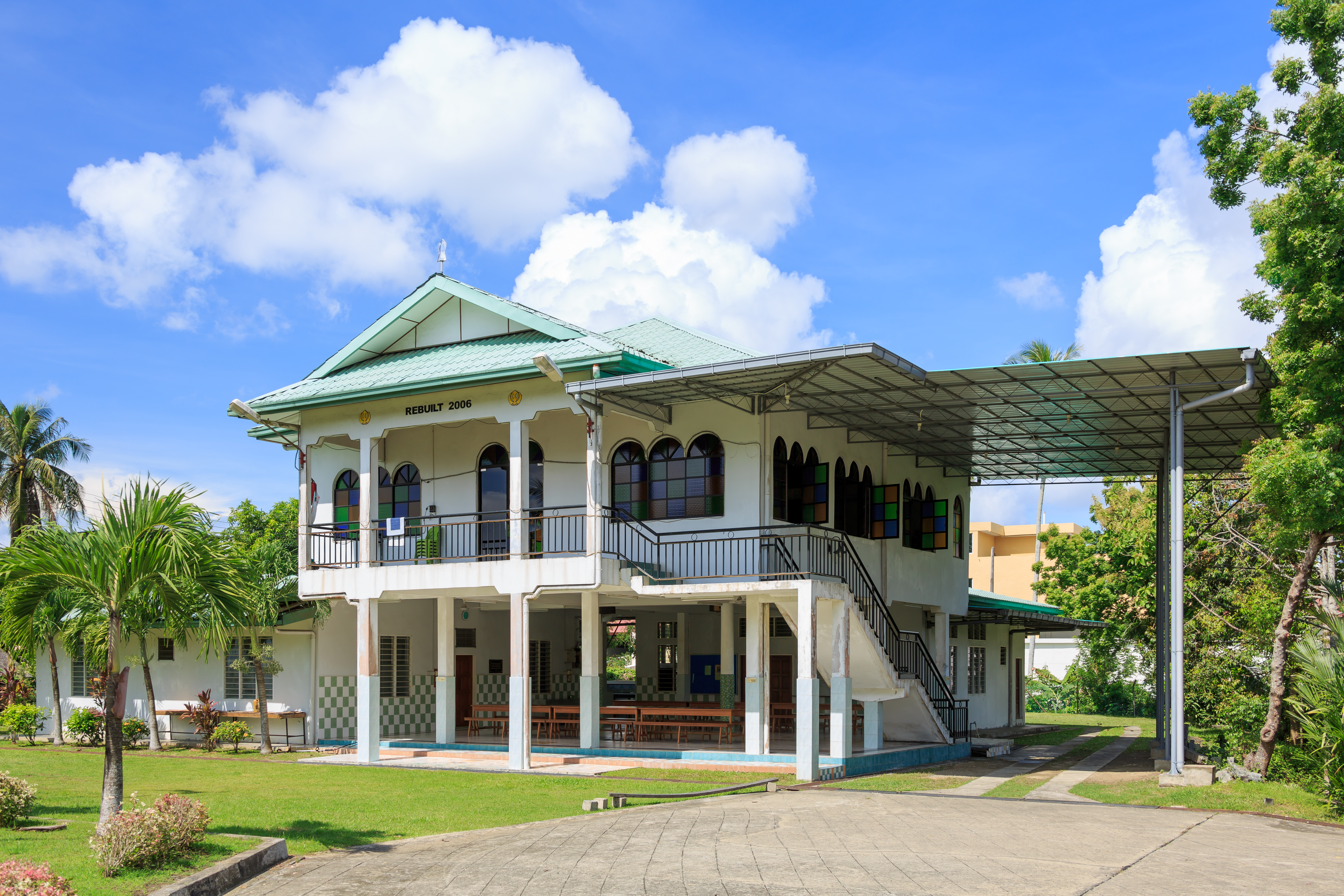
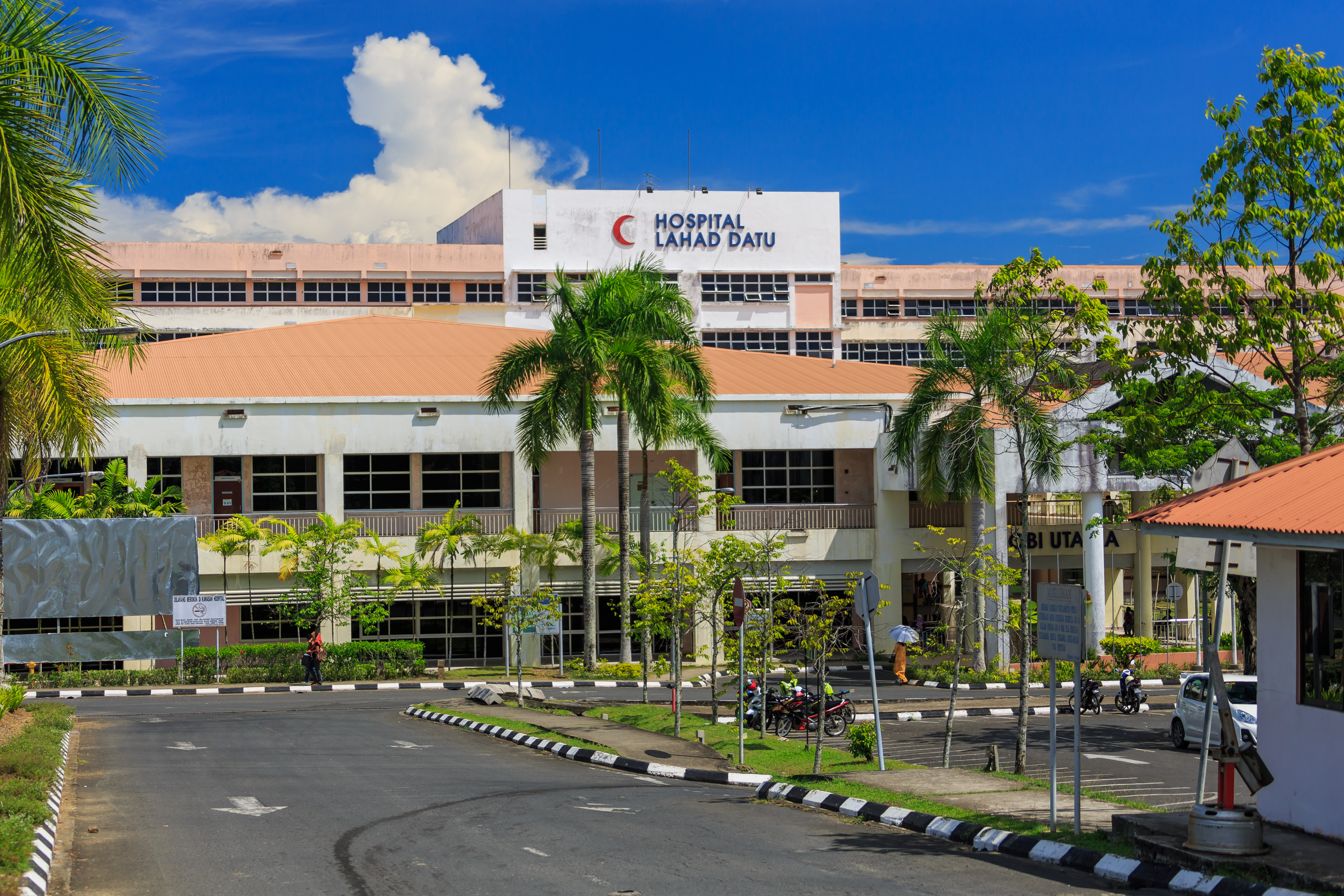
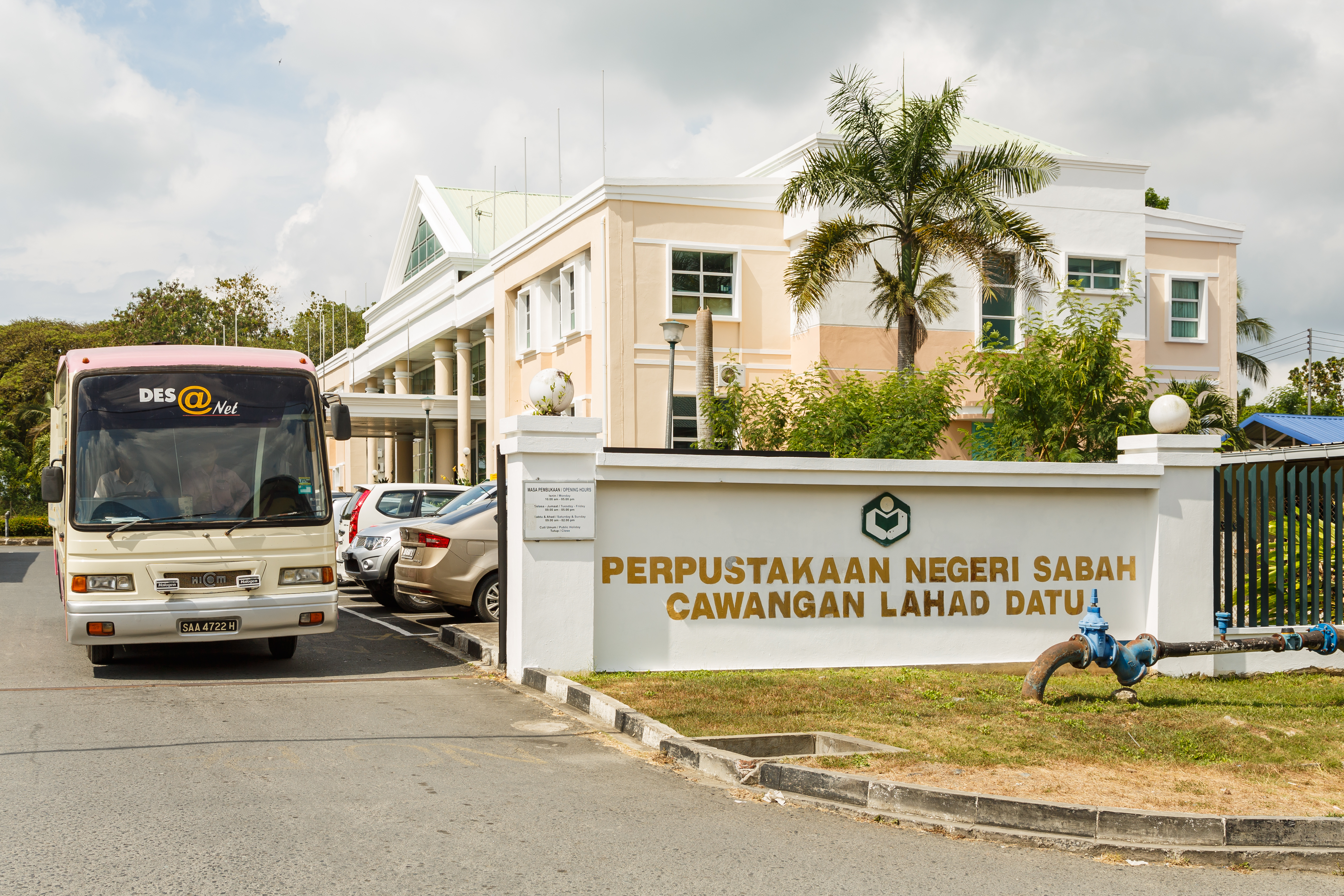
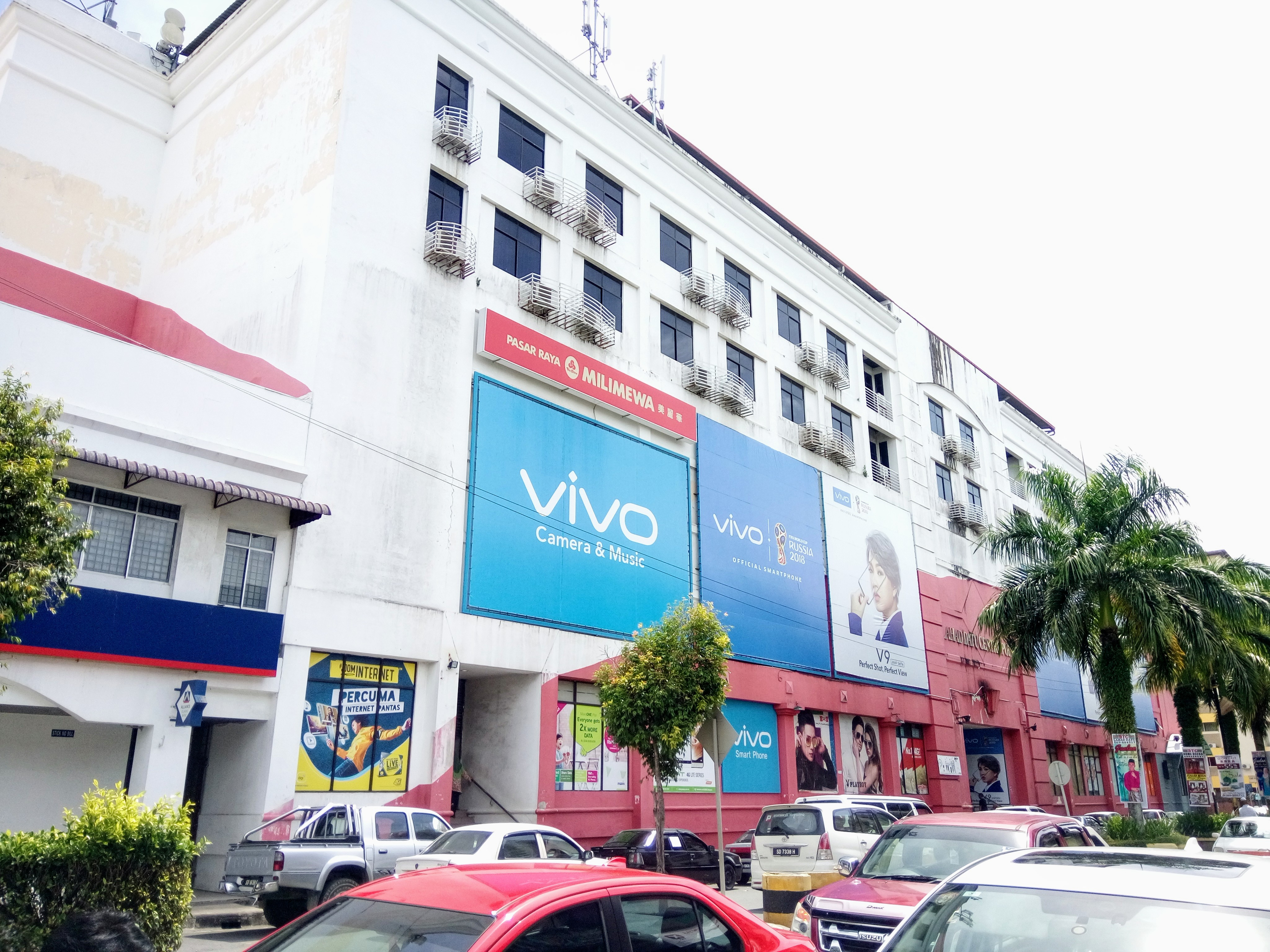
- From top, left to right: Lahad Datu Skyline with Darvel Bay in the far background, the City Mosque, the Basel Christian Church, the Guan Yin Temple, the Sikhs Temple, the Hospital Lahad Datu, the Lahad Datu Library, and the Centre Point Shopping Complex

- Seal

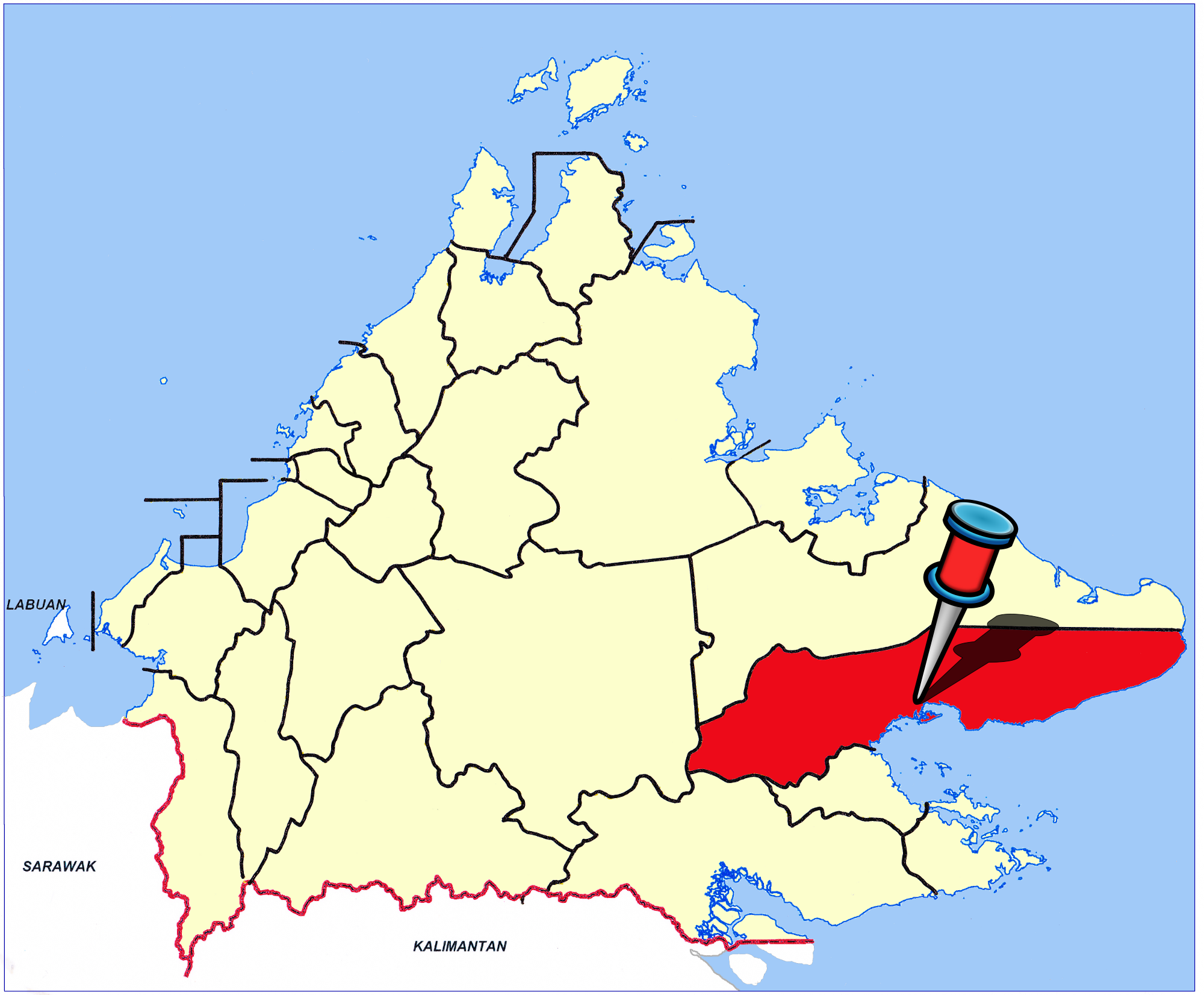
- Coordinates: 5°01′48″N 118°20′24″E
- Country: Malaysia
- State: Sabah
- Division: Tawau
- District: Lahad Datu

Population (2010)
  - Total: 27,887

Lahad Datu (Malay: Bandar Lahad Datu) is the capital of the Lahad Datu District in the Dent Peninsula on Tawau Division of Sabah, Malaysia. Its population was estimated to be around 27,887 in 2010. The town is surrounded by stretches of cocoa and palm oil plantations. It is also an important timber exporting port. The town has an airport for domestic flights.

== History ==
A settlement is believed to have existed here in the 15th century, as excavations have unearthed Ming dynasty Chinese ceramics. Just east of Lahad Datu is the village of Tunku, a notorious base for pirates and slave traders in the 19th century.

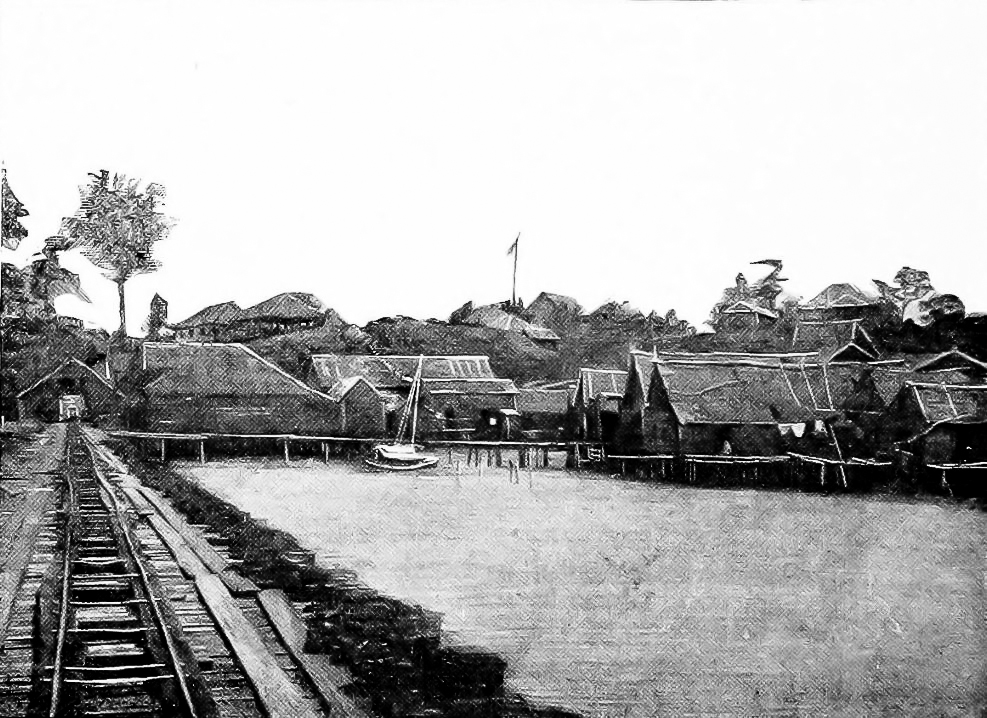
New Darvel Bay Tobacco Company's Wharf at Lahad Datu

Based on a Jawi manuscript from 1408 in the Ida'an language, the town is believed to be the first site in northern Borneo where Islam was first introduced. The Jawi manuscript gives an account of an Ida'an man named Abdullah in Darvel Bay who embraced Islam.

=== Foreign militant intrusion ===
On 23 September 1985, 15 to 20 armed foreign pirates from the neighbouring Philippines landed on this town, killing at least 21 people and injuring 11 others.

Another standoff occurred in February 2013 and lasted for over a month between Malaysian authorities and the Filipino-based militants of the self-proclaimed "Royal Security Forces of the Sultanate of Sulu and North Borneo" led by Jamalul Kiram III and resulted in a Malaysian victory and creation of the Eastern Sabah Security Command and Eastern Sabah Security Zone.

The standoff reportedly saw a total of 68 deaths – 56 from the Sulu sultanate, nine from the Malaysian authorities and six civilians. Before this incursion, the government of Malaysia continued to dutifully pay an annual cession payment amounting to roughly $1,000 to the indirect heirs of the Sultan honoring an 1878 agreement, where North Borneo – today’s Sabah – was conceded by the late Sultan of Sulu to a British company. After the event, the Malaysian government halted the payment. Years later, eight of these Sulu heirs, who insisted they were not involved in the standoff, hired lawyers to pursue legal action based on the original commercial deal. The case is still ongoing.

== Economy ==
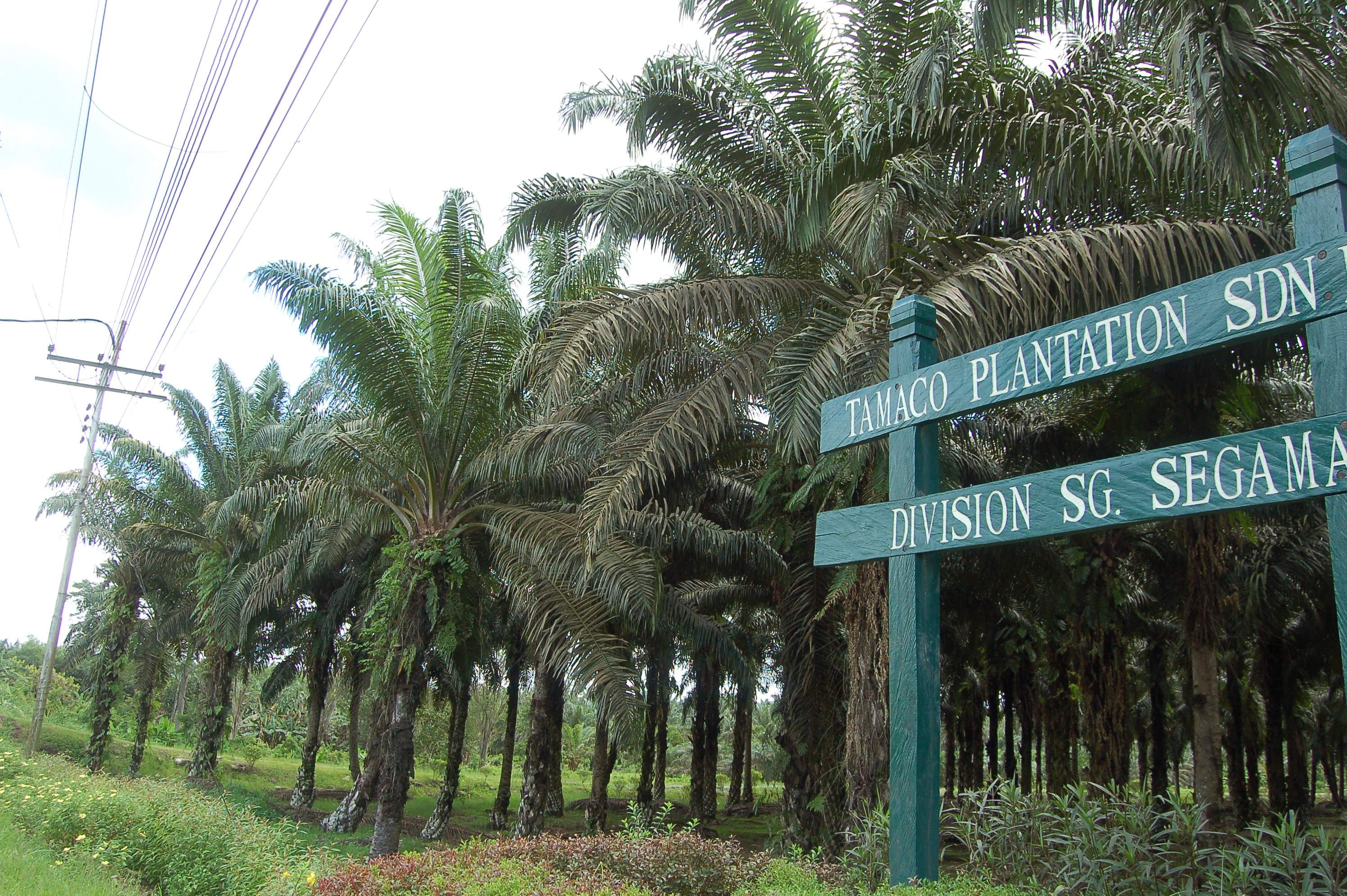
A palm oil plantation in Lahad Datu, palm oil has become the main economic source for the town.

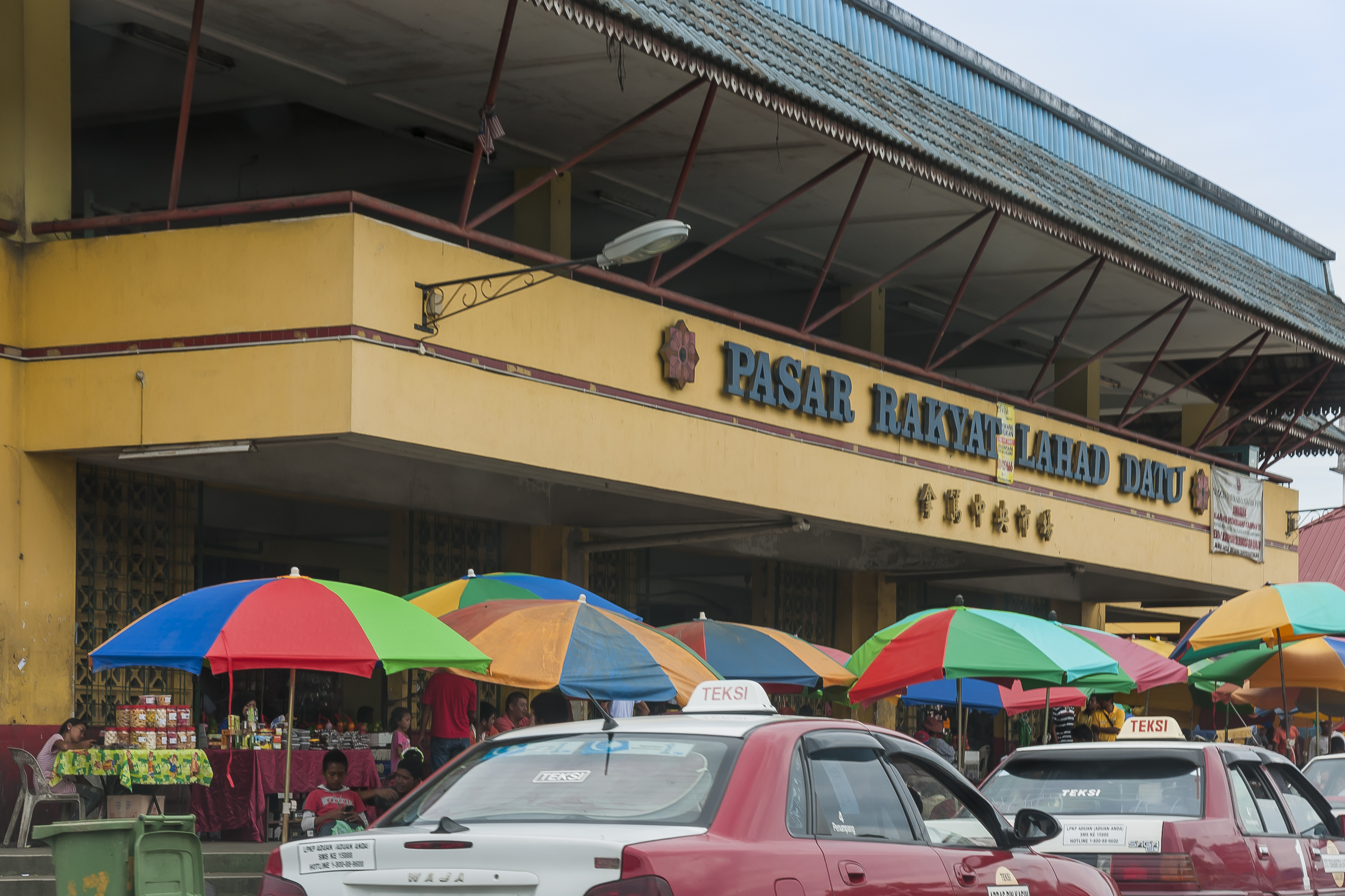
Lahad Datu Central Market.

Lahad Datu also has several palm oil refineries. The Palm Oil Industrial Cluster (POIC) is located near Lahad Datu township. POIC owns and operates its own port, POIC Port Lahad Datu and received its first vessel on 1 March 2013. It consists of 1,150 acres (5 km^{2}) of industrial land developed (with a centralised bulking facility, dry, liquid, barge and container terminals with a sea draft of 20 meters, making it one of the few deep sea ports in the world). To date, 55 companies have invested in POIC with 11 companies involved in fertilizer (making it the biggest cluster of fertilizer companies). POIC is a wholly state-owned company under the purview of the Ministry of Industrial Development, Sabah.

== Transportation ==
Lahad Datu is linked to other towns and districts via Federal Route 13, a part of larger Pan-Borneo Highway network in the east coast of Sabah. Works of constructing a new bypass road on Sandakan-Tawau route has been commenced on mid 2016, to relieve the traffic congestion on the town itself. Lahad Datu is served by many different methods of transportation. Taxis, buses and minibuses are abundant and provide connectivity around the town and other districts such as Sandakan and Tawau. Lahad Datu Port is a container port administered by Sabah Port Sdn. Bhd.

First Palm City Centre (FPCC) along Jalan Pantai is an integrated commercial development by Titijaya Land Berhad. It consist of 2-3 storey of retail shoplots, bus terminal and anchor business, Econsave operating in this strategic business address. 1.5 km to town, 2 km to Lahad Datu Airport and 2.5 km to Lahad Datu Hospital.

AirBorneo, a state-owned regional airline provides four flights daily to Kota Kinabalu, the state's capital, and one daily departure to Sandakan from Lahad Datu Airport.

== Climate ==
Lahad Datu has a tropical rainforest climate (Af) with heavy rainfall year-round.

Climate data for Lahad Datu
Month	Jan	Feb	Mar	Apr	May	Jun	Jul	Aug	Sep	Oct	Nov	Dec	Year
Mean daily maximum °C (°F)	29.6 (85.3)	29.6 (85.3)	30.3 (86.5)	31.1 (88.0)	31.7 (89.1)	31.5 (88.7)	31.5 (88.7)	31.7 (89.1)	31.5 (88.7)	31.2 (88.2)	30.6 (87.1)	29.9 (85.8)	30.9 (87.5)
Daily mean °C (°F)	26.3 (79.3)	26.3 (79.3)	26.7 (80.1)	27.2 (81.0)	27.6 (81.7)	27.3 (81.1)	27.1 (80.8)	27.3 (81.1)	27.1 (80.8)	27.0 (80.6)	26.8 (80.2)	26.4 (79.5)	26.9 (80.5)
Mean daily minimum °C (°F)	23.0 (73.4)	23.1 (73.6)	23.1 (73.6)	23.3 (73.9)	23.5 (74.3)	23.1 (73.6)	22.8 (73.0)	22.9 (73.2)	22.8 (73.0)	22.9 (73.2)	23.1 (73.6)	23.0 (73.4)	23.1 (73.5)
Average rainfall mm (inches)	249 (9.8)	211 (8.3)	159 (6.3)	132 (5.2)	155 (6.1)	141 (5.6)	135 (5.3)	151 (5.9)	138 (5.4)	184 (7.2)	182 (7.2)	226 (8.9)	2,063 (81.2)
Source: Climate-Data.org
