= Adal Island =

Island in Malaysia

Adal
Native name: Pulau Adal
- Interactive map of Adal

Geography
- Location: Darvel Bay
- Coordinates: 4°44′43″N 118°31′0″E

Administration
- Malaysia
- State: Sabah
- Division: Tawau
- District: Semporna

The Adal Island (Malay: Pulau Adal) is an island located near the Timbun Mata island in Sabah, Malaysia.

== See also ==
- List of islands of Malaysia
