= Bait Island =

Island in Malaysia

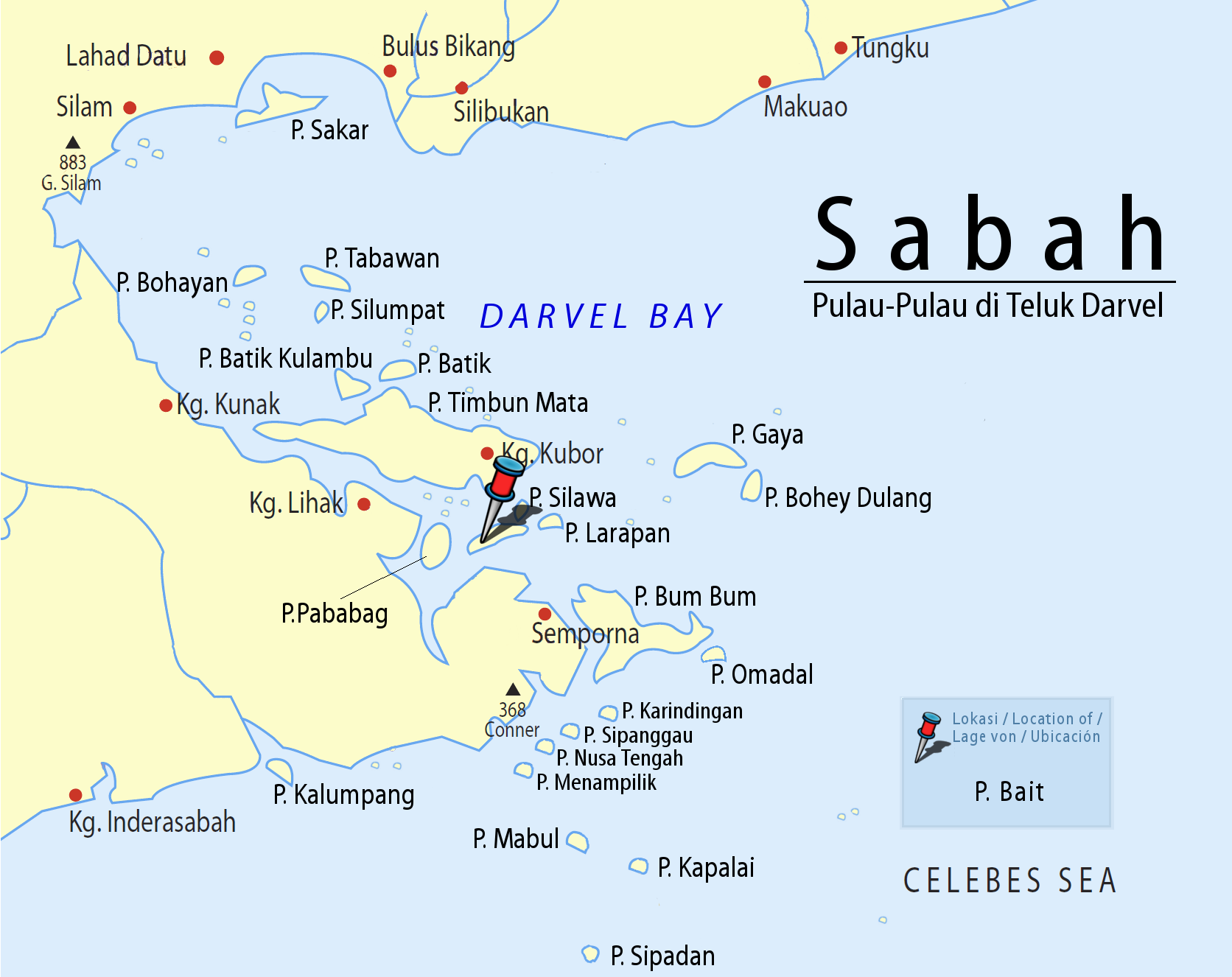
- Location of Bait Island in Celebes Sea
- Interactive map of Bait Island

Geography
- Coordinates: 4°32′55.7″N 118°33′0″E

Administration
- Malaysia
- State: Sabah
- Division: Tawau
- District: Semporna

Bait Island (Malay: Pulau Bait) is an island located near Semporna in the Tawau Division, Sabah, Malaysia. The predominant languages spoken in this island are Javanese and Malay language and its currency is Malaysian ringgit (MYR).

== See also ==
- List of islands of Malaysia
