= Balusuan Island =

Island in Malaysia

- Interactive map of Balusuan Island

Geography
- Coordinates: 4°40′47.64″N 118°32′21.83″E

Administration
- Malaysia
- State: Sabah
- Division: Tawau
- District: Semporna

Balusuan Island (Malay: Pulau Balusuan) is an island located near Semporna in Sabah, Malaysia.

== See also ==
- List of islands of Malaysia
