= Larapan Island =

Island in Malaysia

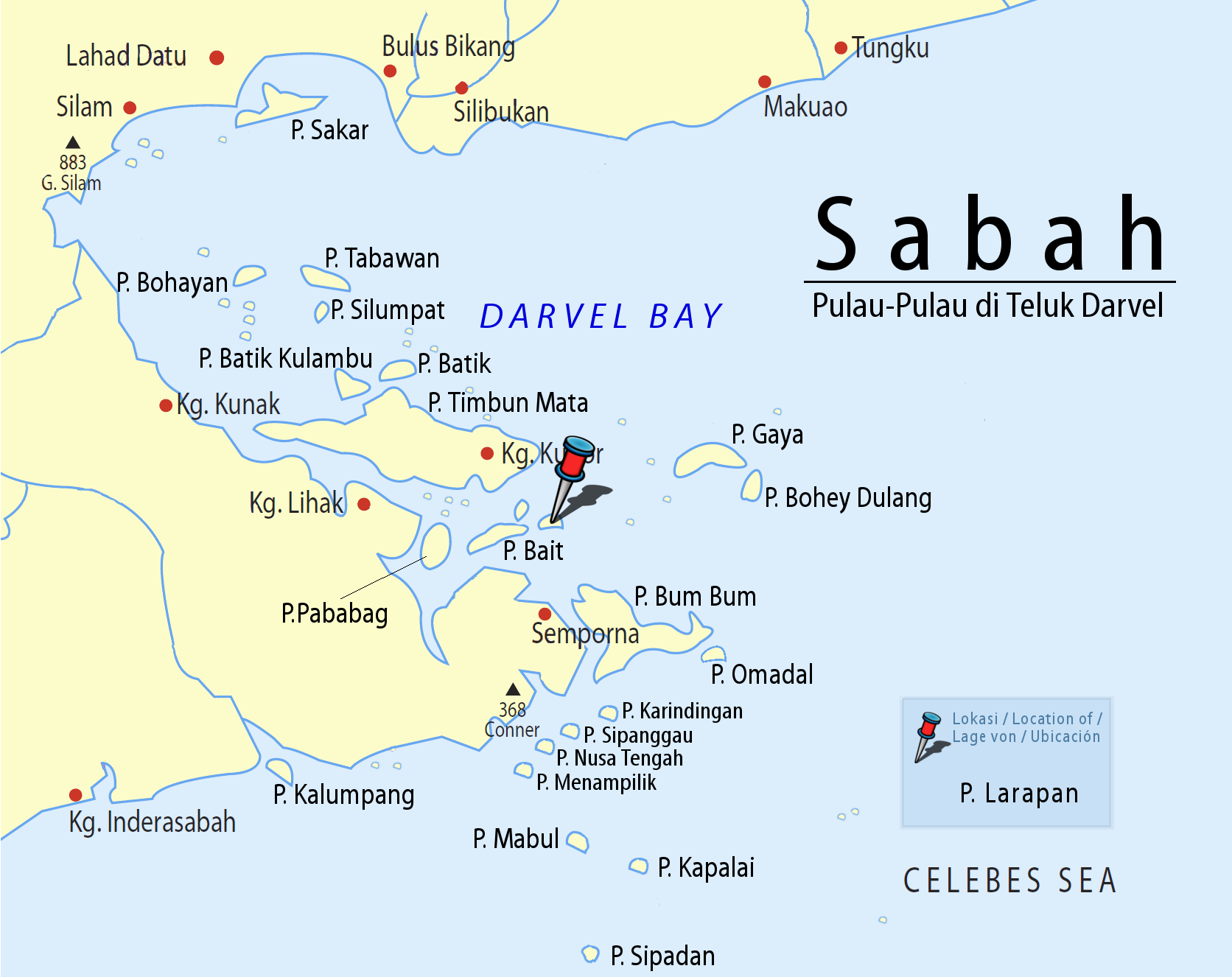
- Location of Larapan Island in Darvel Bay
- Interactive map of Larapan Island

Geography
- Coordinates: 4°33′38″N 118°36′25″E

Administration
- Malaysia
- State: Sabah
- Division: Tawau
- District: Semporna

Larapan Island (Malay: Pulau Larapan) is a Malaysian island located in the Celebes Sea on the state of Sabah. The island is one of the many islands in Malaysia and has been under Sabah Provincial management of Malaysia. The islands are managed under the Rule and governance of the Malaysian govt.

== Population ==
The island is inhabited by local communities, primarily in Kampung Larapan Hujung and Kampung Larapan Tengah. A few hundred people live on the Island (2023).

== Marine ecology ==
Larapan Island's surrounding reefs contain diverse coral ecosystems that face threats such as bleaching and predatory snails (e.g., Drupella). Community-based waste management initiatives have reduced marine waste significantly in Semporna’s island communities, including Larapan. In addition, local district authorities (Semporna District Office) support conservation activities to protect Larapan's marine ecology and community livelihood.

== Above the Sea level ==
The estimate terrain elevation above sea level in some places on the island is 12 meters.

See also

- List of islands of Malaysia
