= Battle of Semporna =

Moro pirate attack in North Borneo (1954)

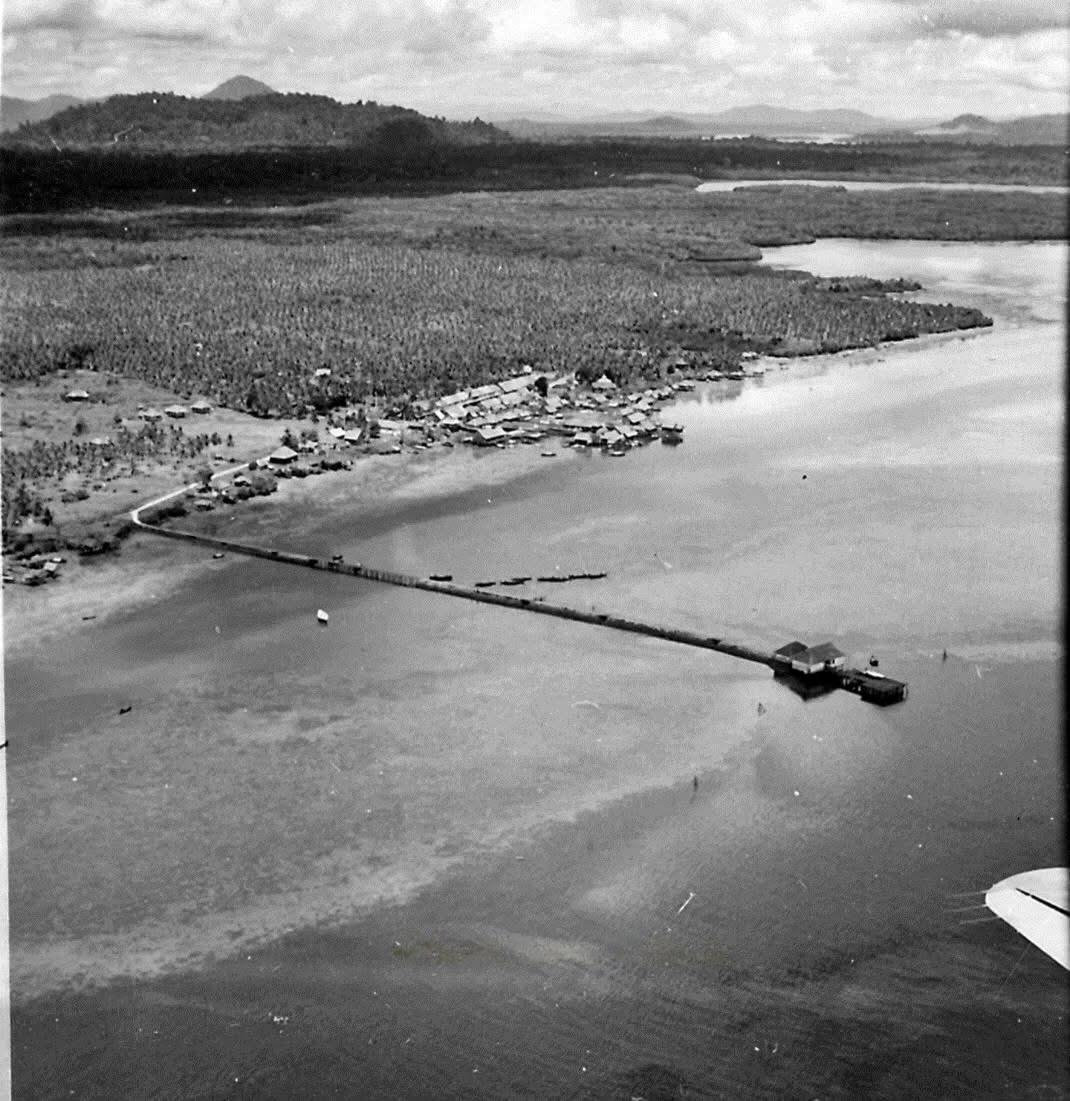
- Semporna in the early 1950's.
Date	29 March 1954
Location	Semporna, North Borneo 4°29′00″N 118°37′00″E

Belligerents
(Crown Colony of North Borneo) North Borneo Police Force	Moro pirates

Casualties and losses
Killed: 4x Police, 3x civilians	Unknown

The Battle of Semporna, also known as the Semporna pirate attack, was a pirate raid by Moro pirates in the town of Semporna, Crown Colony of North Borneo (present day Sabah).

== History ==
On 29 March 1954, two kumpits landed at the jetty in the coastal town of Semporna. The chief clerk of Customs, Gerard Chong, was getting ready to lock up for the night when the boats landed. He walked up to the vessels to ask them for their identification. A man aboard brought out a barong and swung it at Chong, who barely got away and ran toward the beach.

The men aboard the two vessels were Moro pirates, armed with fully automatic rifles, and they started firing their weapons at Chong as he ran down the jetty, barely escaping. An off-duty North Borneo Forest Department officer named T.R. Barnard, aboard his own fishing boat down the bay, brought out a shotgun from his cabin and started firing at the pirates. Barnard killed one of the pirates before he was also shot and killed.

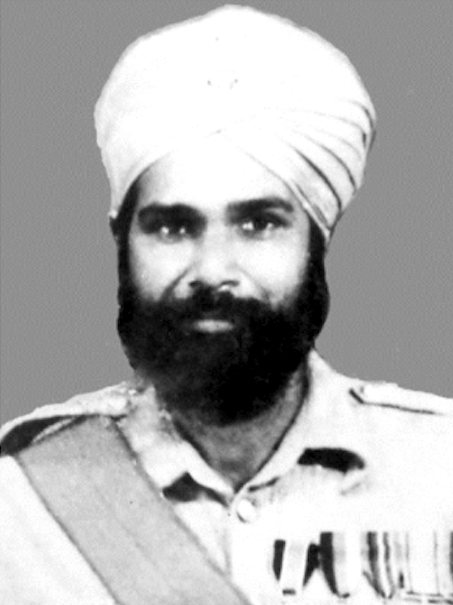
Sergeant Sagar Singh was posthumously awarded a Member of the Order of the British Empire.

Those members of the North Borneo Police Force stationed at the Semporna police station were mostly off-duty at the time, playing a match on the town's football pitch. They heard the shots at the beach, and began running to the police station to grab their own weapons, which were under lock-up. Sergeant Sagar Singh, the officer-in-charge at the time, ordered his men to split up – one team rushed to the barracks to escort their families to safety, while Singh led the other team to rush into the station.

When they got to the police station, another group of pirates was already there – they had landed at another part of the beach and had already secured the station. Singh was shot as soon as he got to the door. Another policeman, Constable Jambuan, was slashed to death on the football pitch. Another four members of the police force were also killed instantly. Singh didn't die from the gunshot. He got back up to fight off the attackers, but one of them slashed him in the back, and he died.

Constable Gimor took the remaining officers in the station to rush out of the building. The pirates took control of the station for three hours. They looted the town and stole any valuables they could find. They went out into the town in parties of three and four men each, raiding shopfronts for any valuables. They killed the town's goldsmith and a young Chinese boy. They also raided several houses, including the house of Henry Chow, who didn't have the time to load his shotgun and had to flee with his family into the jungle.

Barnard was buried the next day at Lahad Datu. Posthumously, Singh was awarded as a Member of the Order of the British Empire.
