= Kapalai =

Island in Malaysia

Kapalai Island
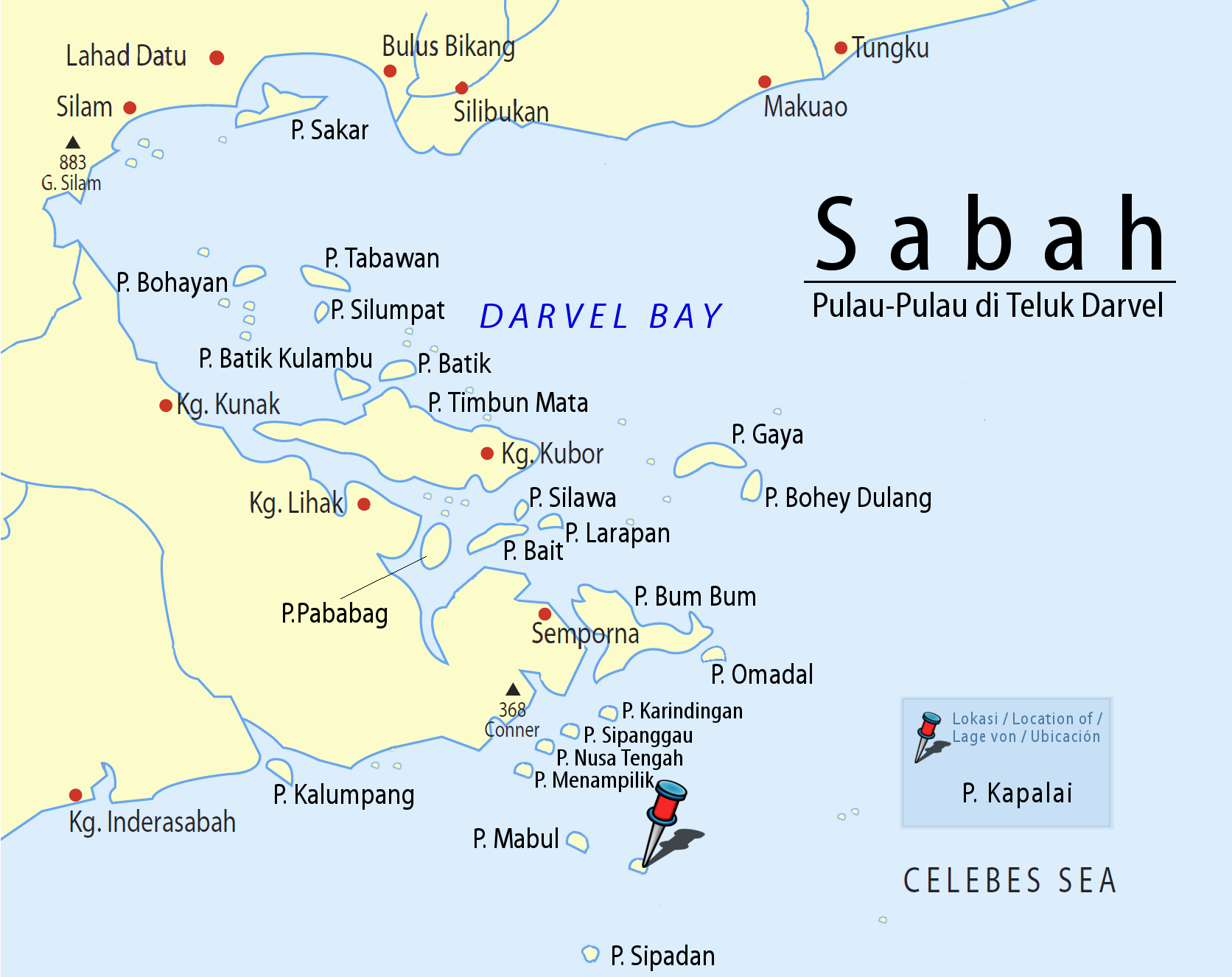
- Location of Kapalai Island in Darvel Bay
- Interactive map of Kapalai Island

Geography
- Coordinates: 4°13′0″N 118°41′0″E

Administration
- Malaysia
- State: Sabah
- Division: Tawau
- District: Semporna

Kapalai (Malay: Pulau Kapalai) is an island in Tawau Division, Sabah, Malaysia, known for its scuba resorts.

The island of Kapalai, just 15 kilometres off Sipadan, was a beautiful island two hundred years ago, but now remains as only a sand bar. Erosion has reduced the island to sea level and the village now sits on the edge of the extensive Ligitan Reefs. All of the buildings rest on stilts resting on the underwater reef. There is only one private resort on the island, with the rest of the island uninhabited.

== Location ==
Kapalai is situated a couple of hours from the east coast of Borneo. Though the island is a relatively remote location to reach, there are daily flights from Kota Kinabalu, less than a one-hour flight from Tawau.

== Transportation ==
As Kapalai Island is located off the east coast of Sabah / Borneo, Malaysia's easternmost state, direct flights are available to Tawau and Kota Kinabalu on Sabah from Kuala Lumpur on peninsular Malaysia and Singapore. The closest airport to Kapalai is Tawau, located approximately one hour from Semporna's jetty by minivan. Semporna's jetty serves as the speedboat departure point for Kapalai and the neighboring Sipadan Island and Mabul Island.

Kapalai Island is located to the northeast of Sipadan Island. Many tour operators provide roundtrip transfers from Tawau Airport to Semporna and onward to Kapalai Island.

== Gallery ==
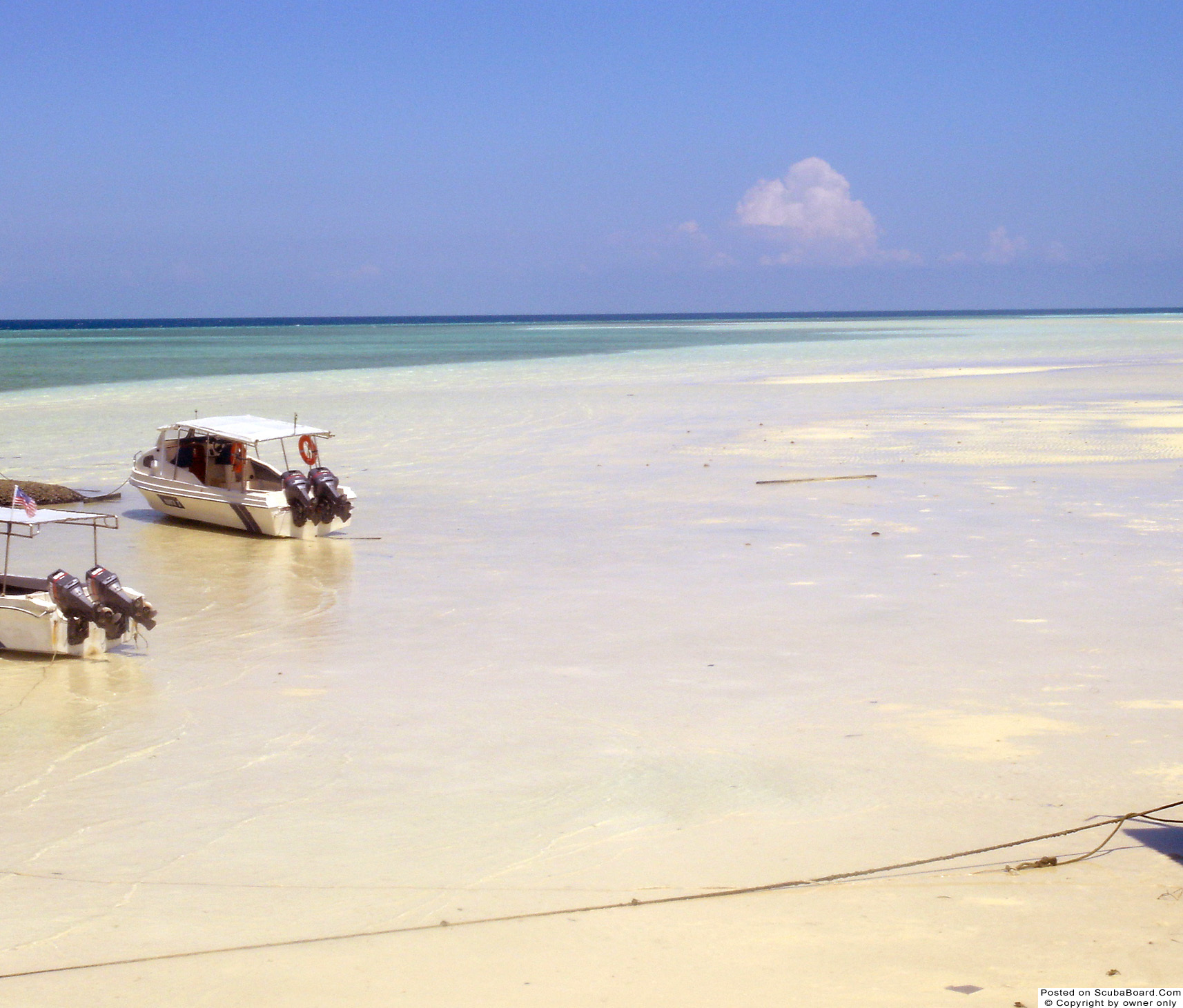
The island beach

Accommodation in the island

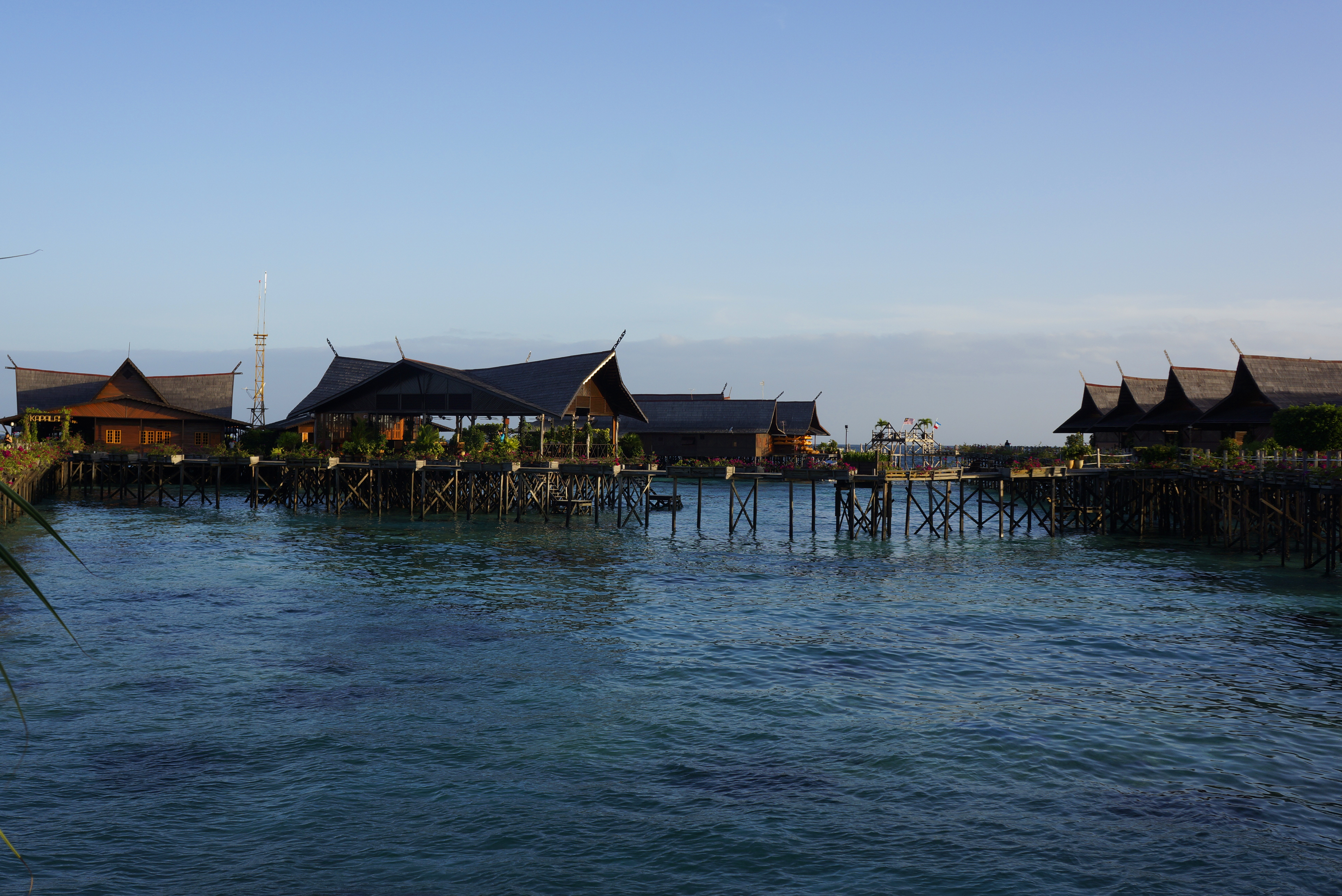
Senja di Kapalai Resort Sabah.

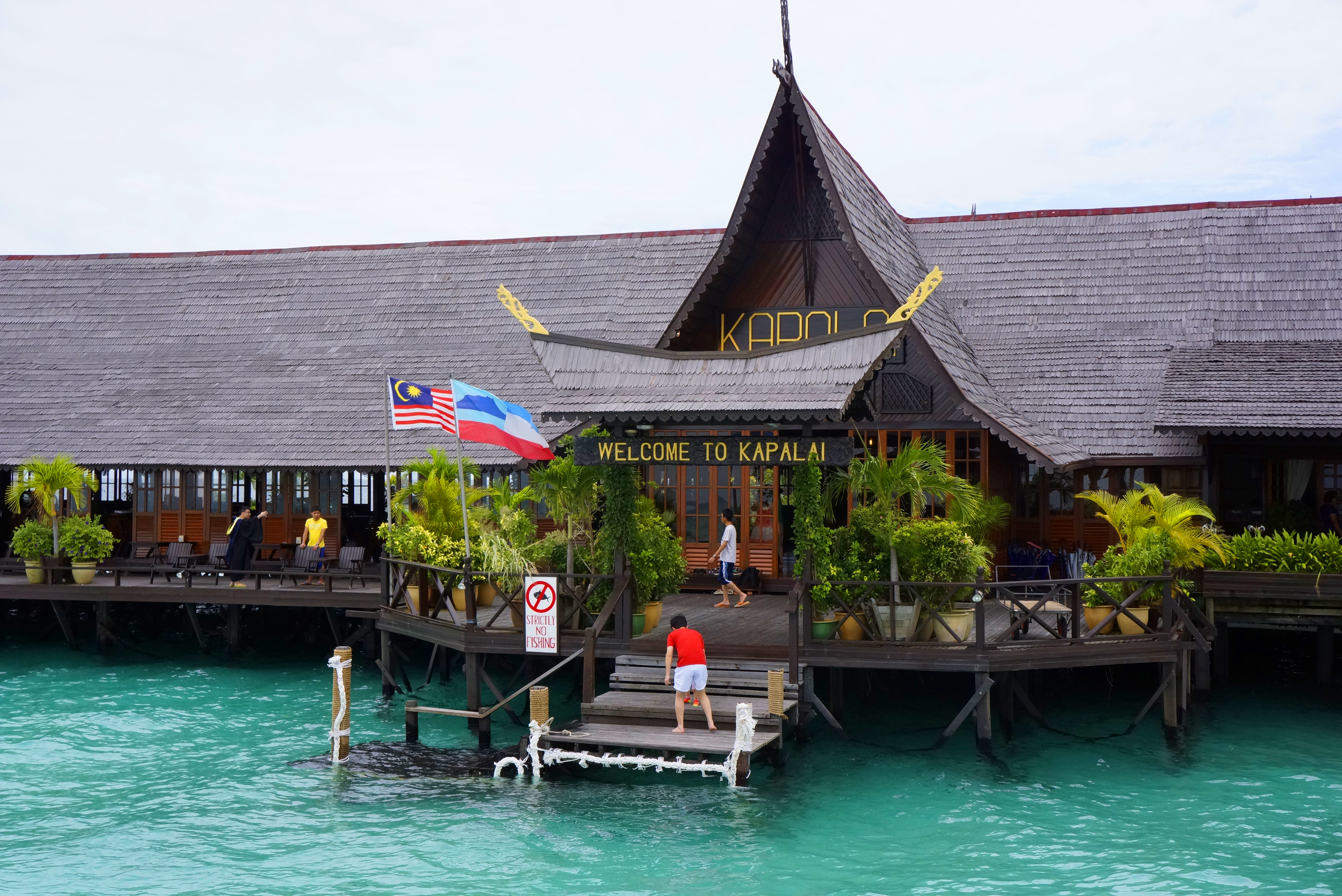
Percutian di Kapalai Resort Sabah.

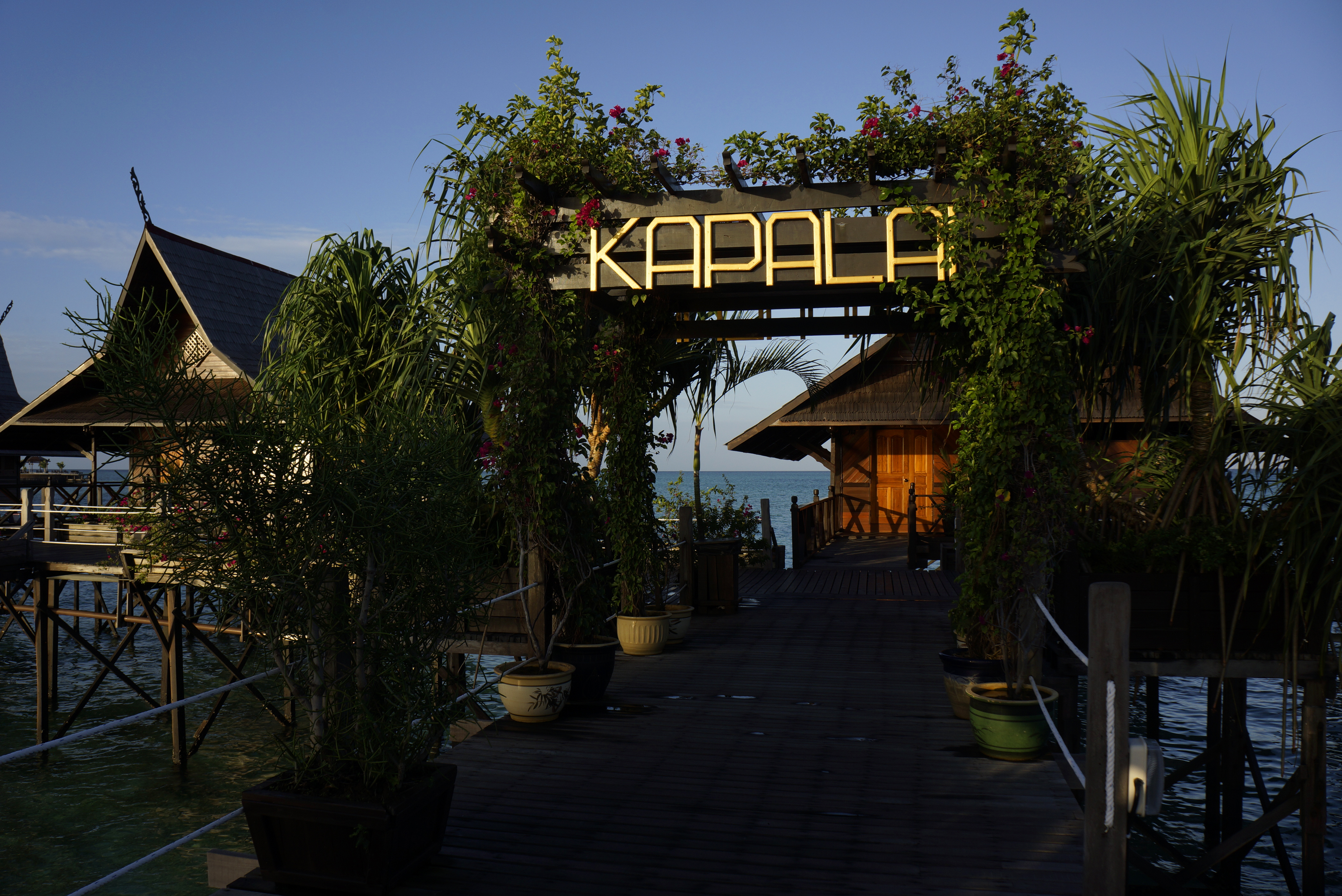
Gerbang Kapalai Resort Sabah.

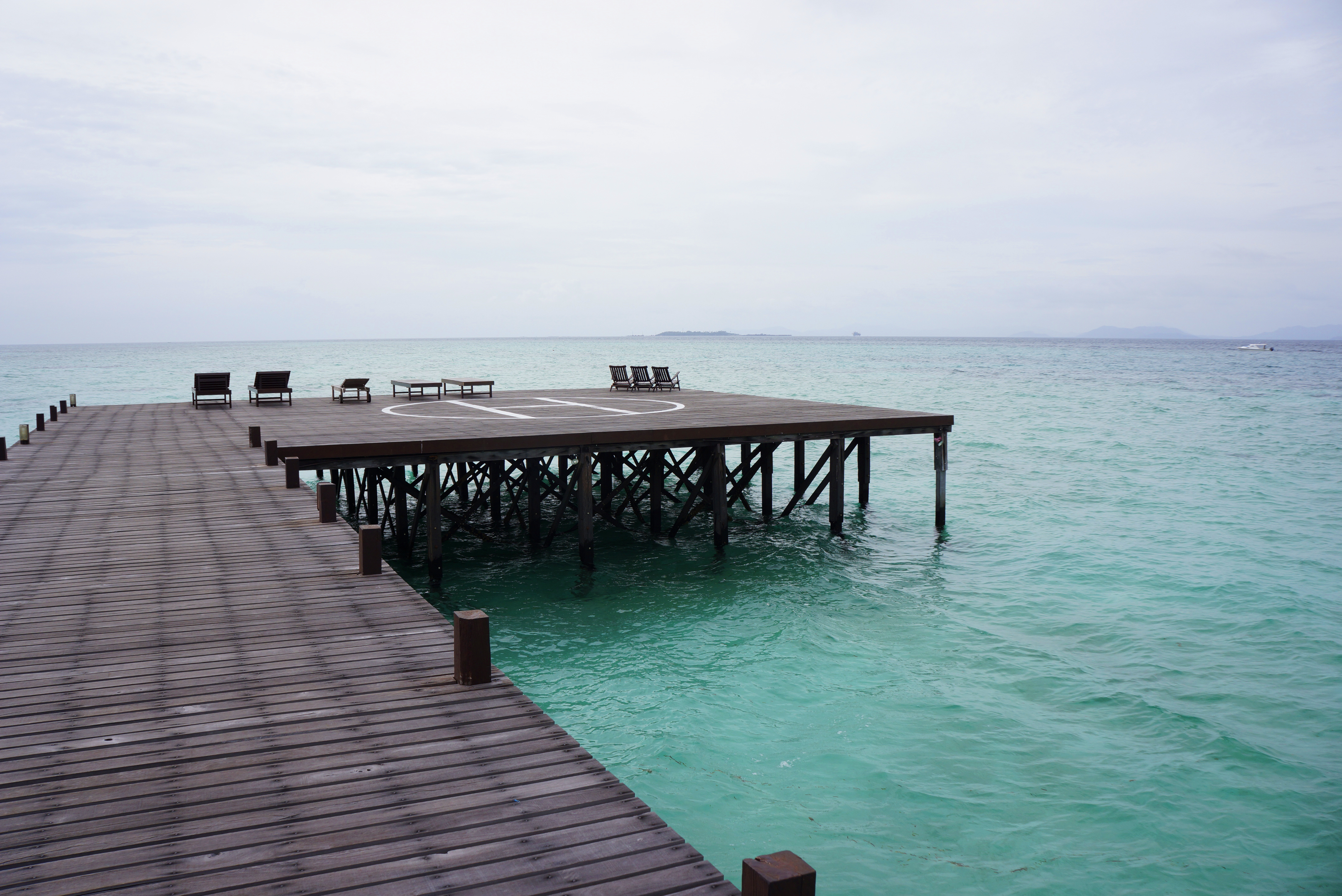
Jeti Kapalai Resort Sabah.

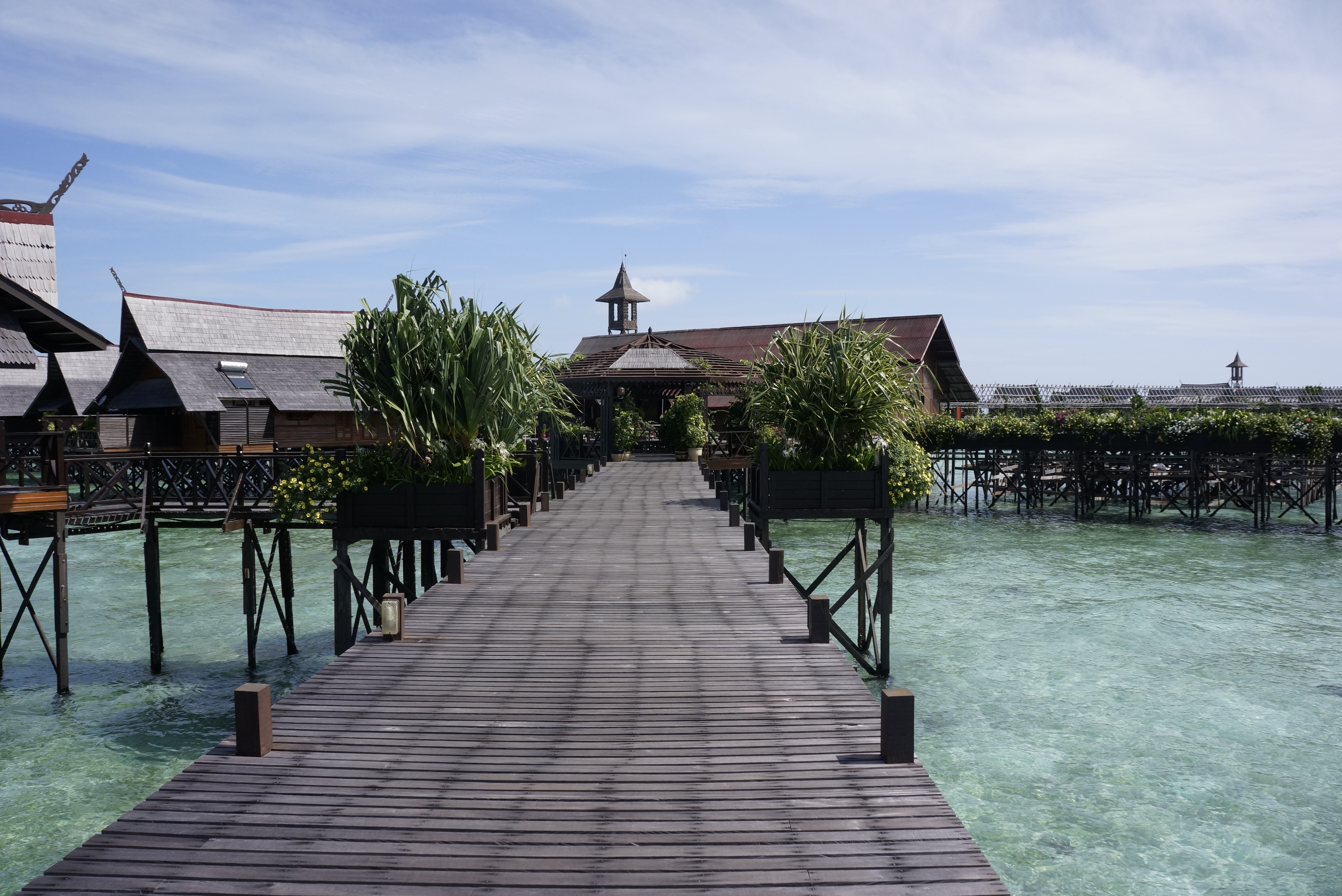
Laluan ke pengginapan di Kapalai Resort Sabah.

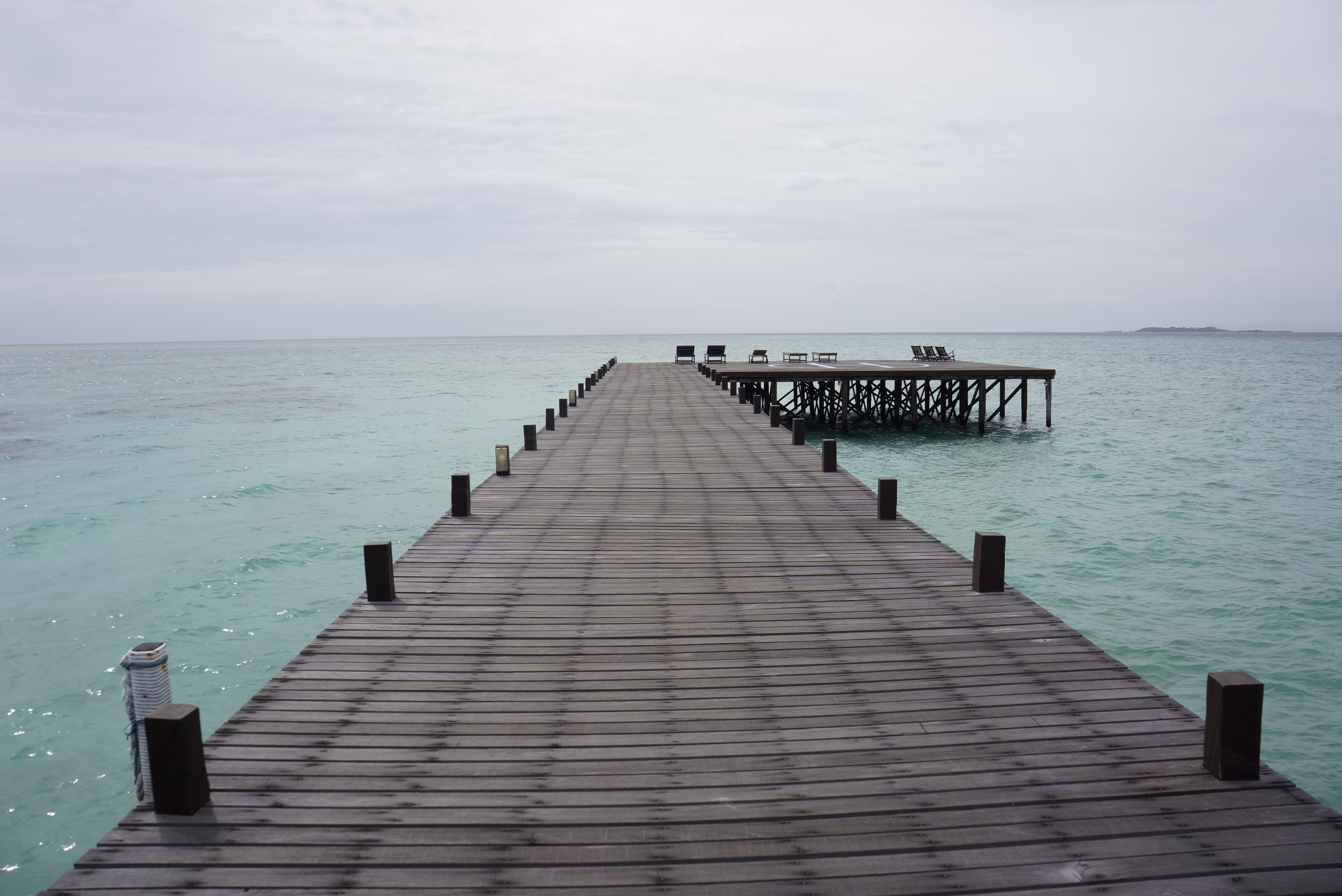
Jeti dan Laut Kapalai Resort Sabah.

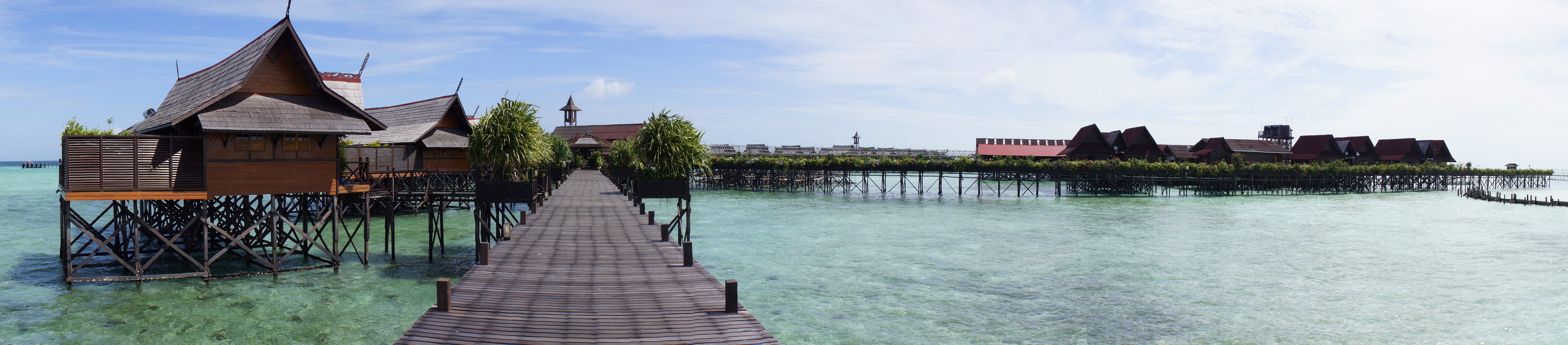
Panaroma Kapalai Resort Sabah.

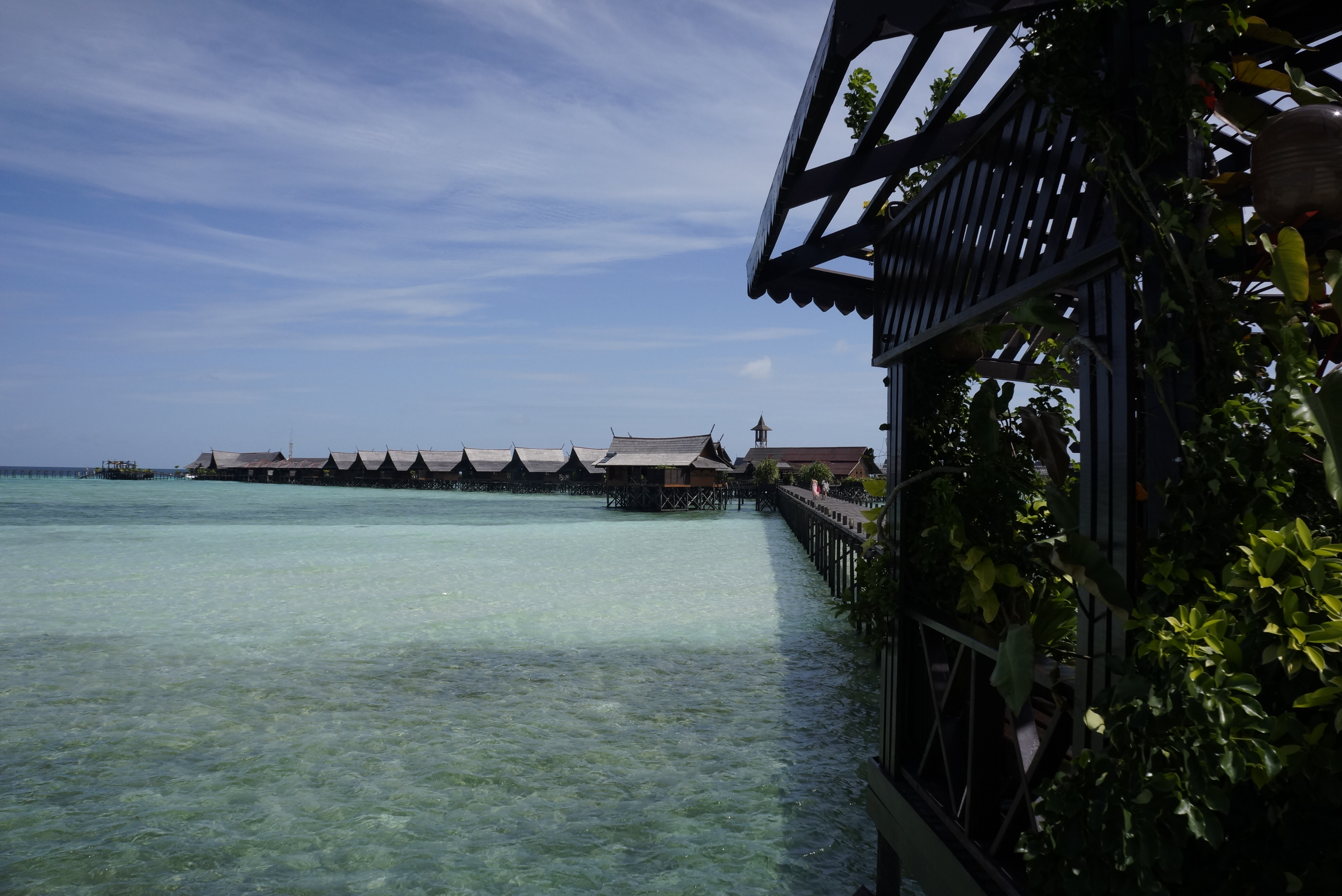
Laut dan Kapalai Resort Sabah.

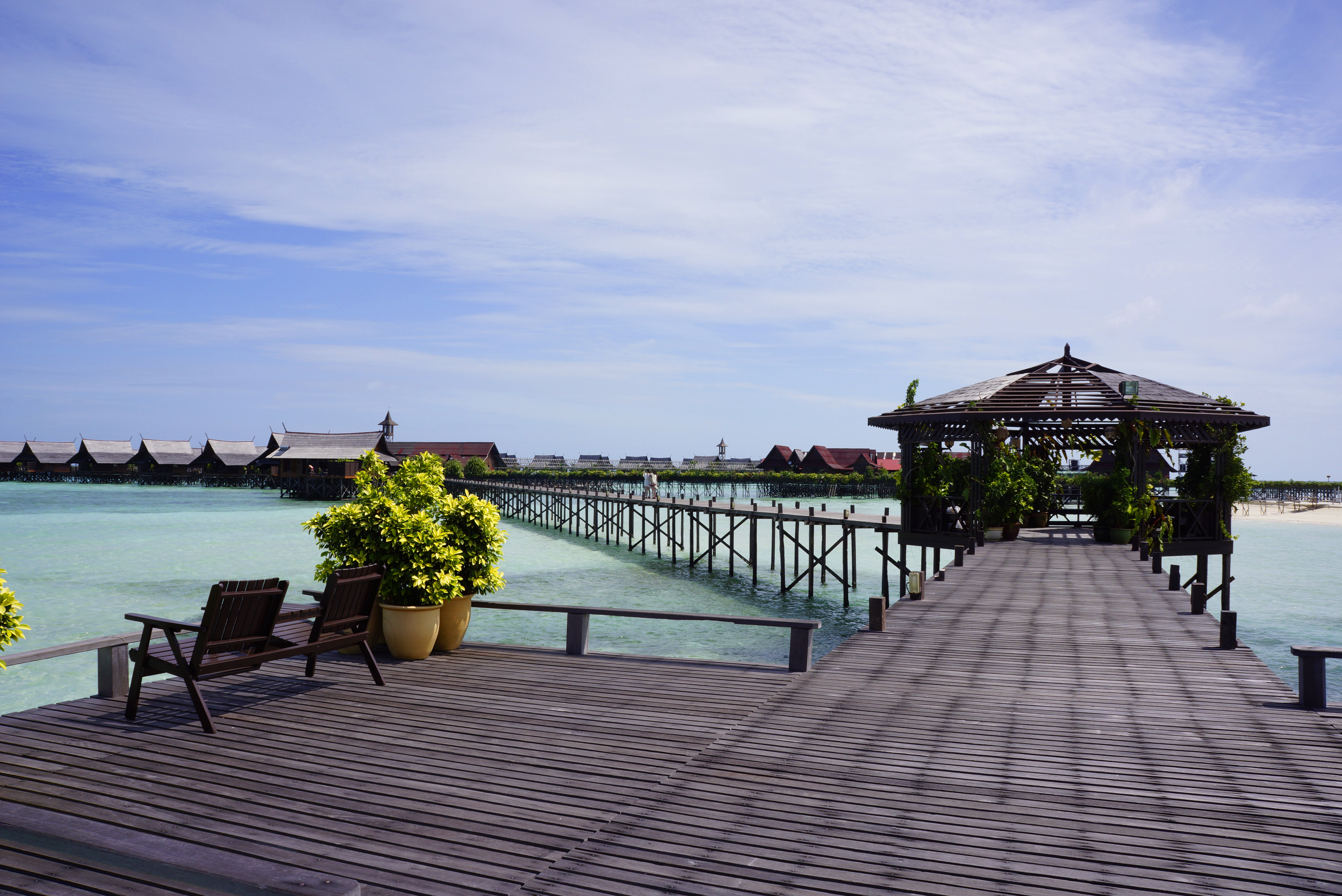
Laluan di Kapalai Resort Sabah.

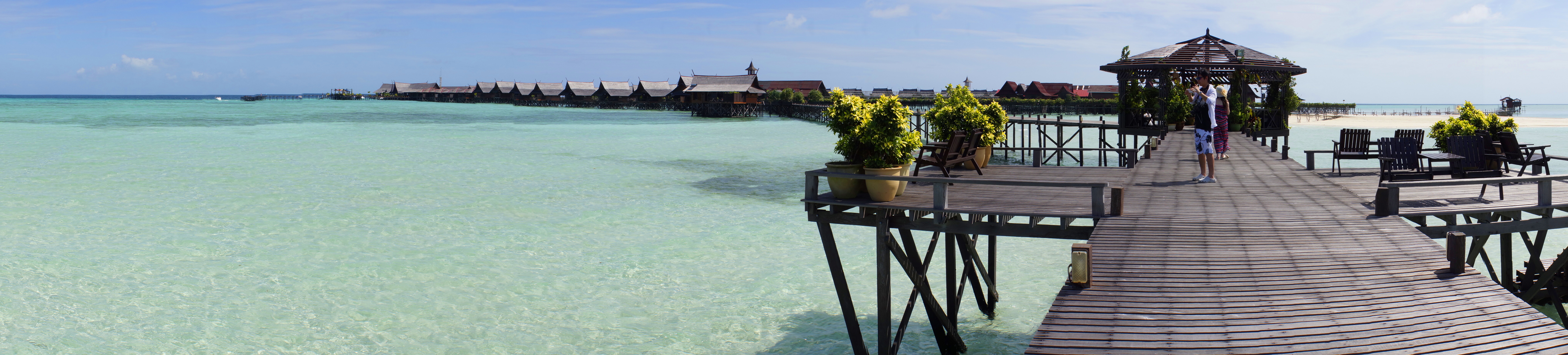
Panaroma luas Kapalai Resort Sabah.

== See also ==
- List of islands of Malaysia
