= Silawa Island =

Island in Malaysia

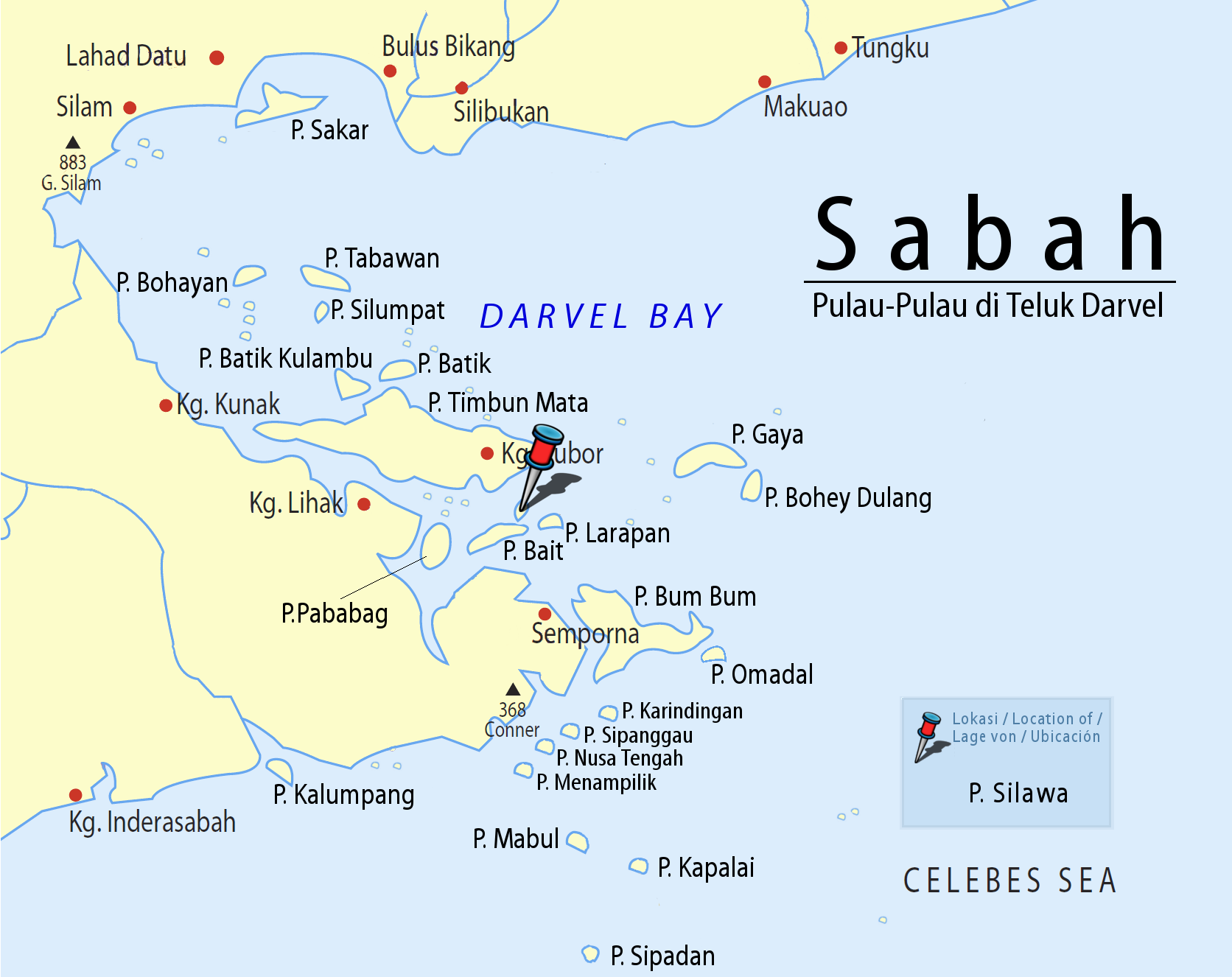
- Location of Silawa Island
- Interactive map of Silawa Island

Geography
- Coordinates: 4°34′23″N 118°34′40″E

Administration
- Malaysia
- State: Sabah
- Division: Tawau
- District: Semporna

Silawa Island (Malay: Pulau Silawa) is a Malaysian island located in the Celebes Sea on the state of Sabah. The latitude of Silawa Island is 4°34'25.68". The longitude is 118°34'44.05".

== See also ==
- .List of islands of Malaysia
