= Semporna =

Semporna Pekan Semporna
- Town and district capital
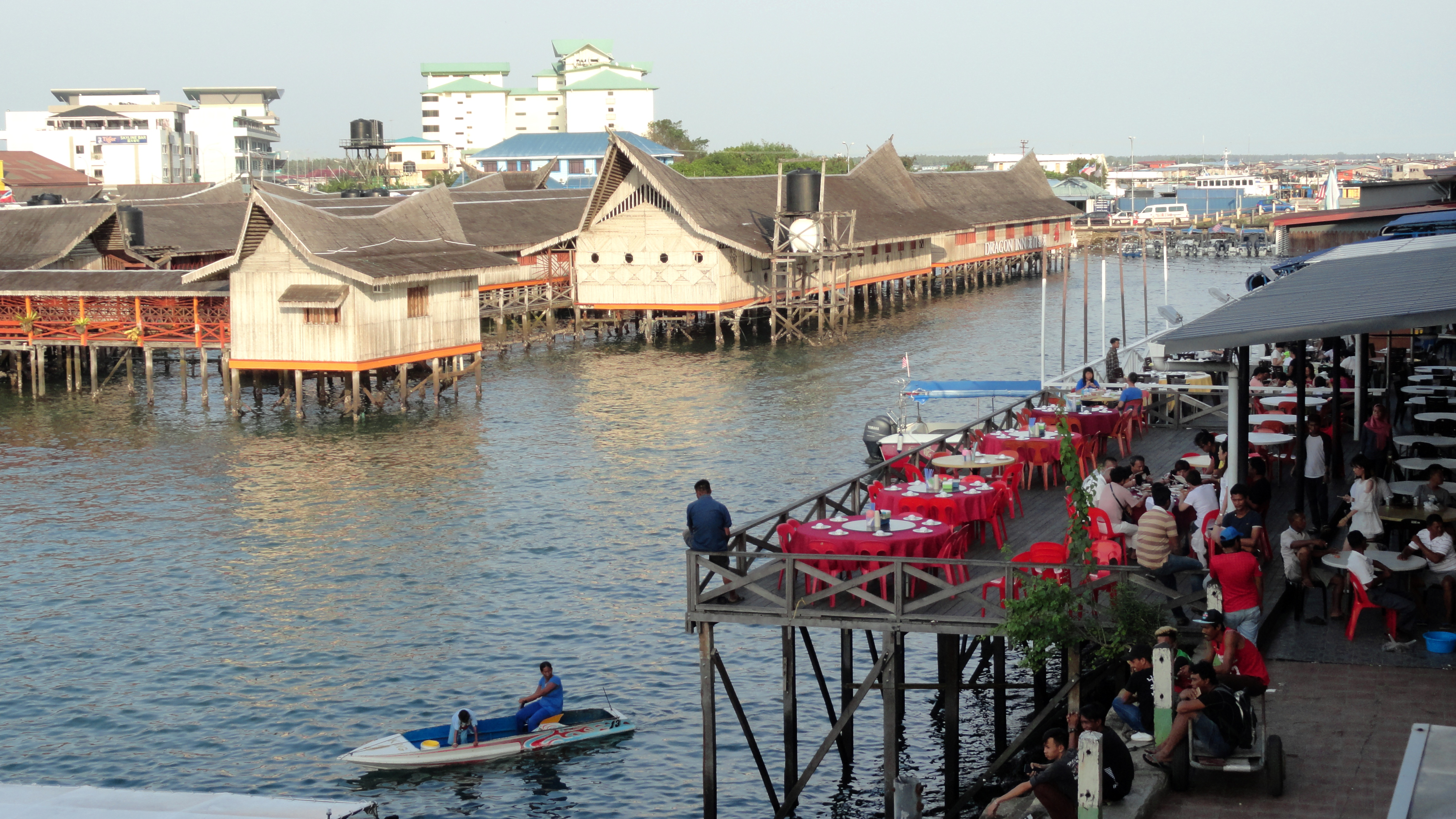
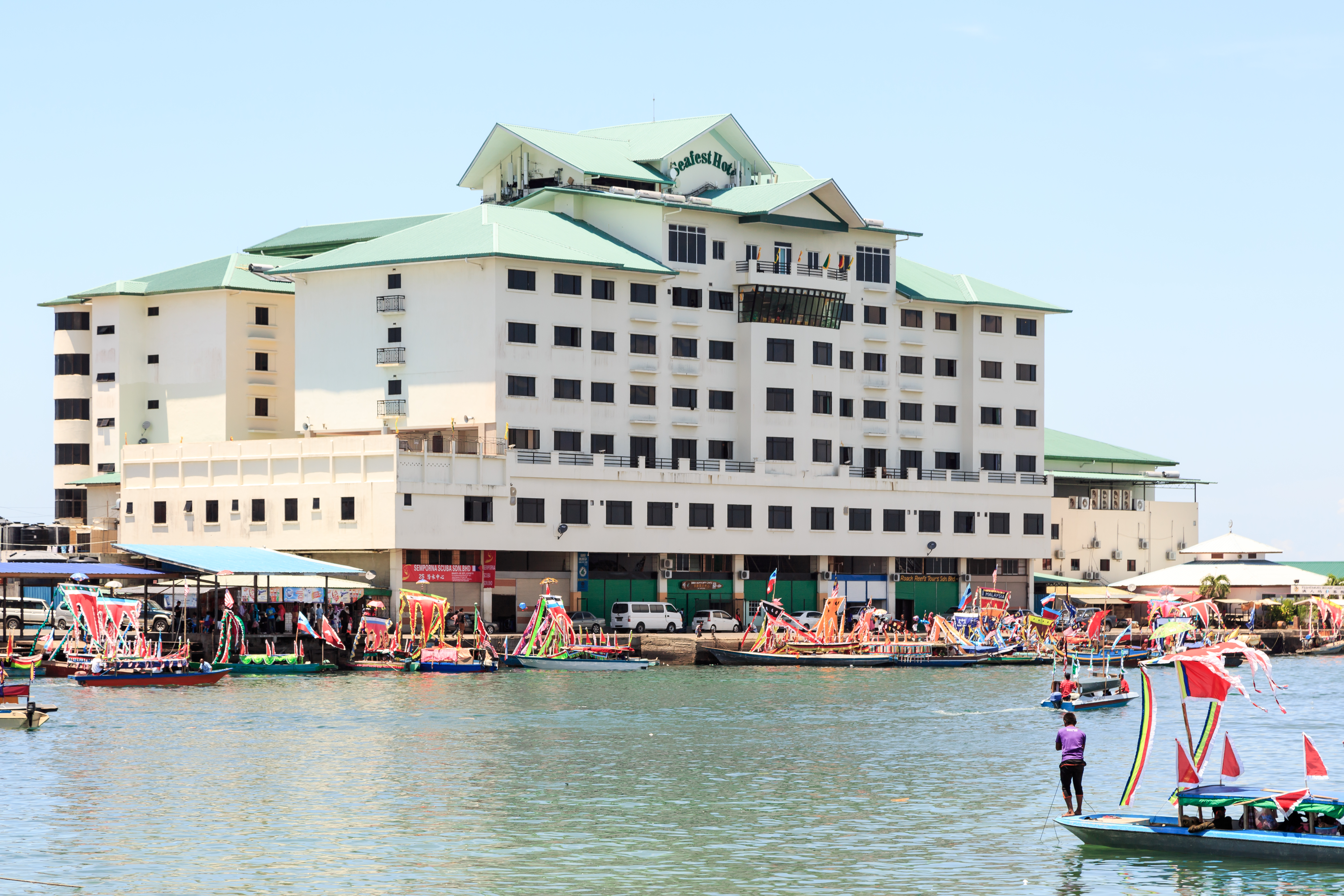
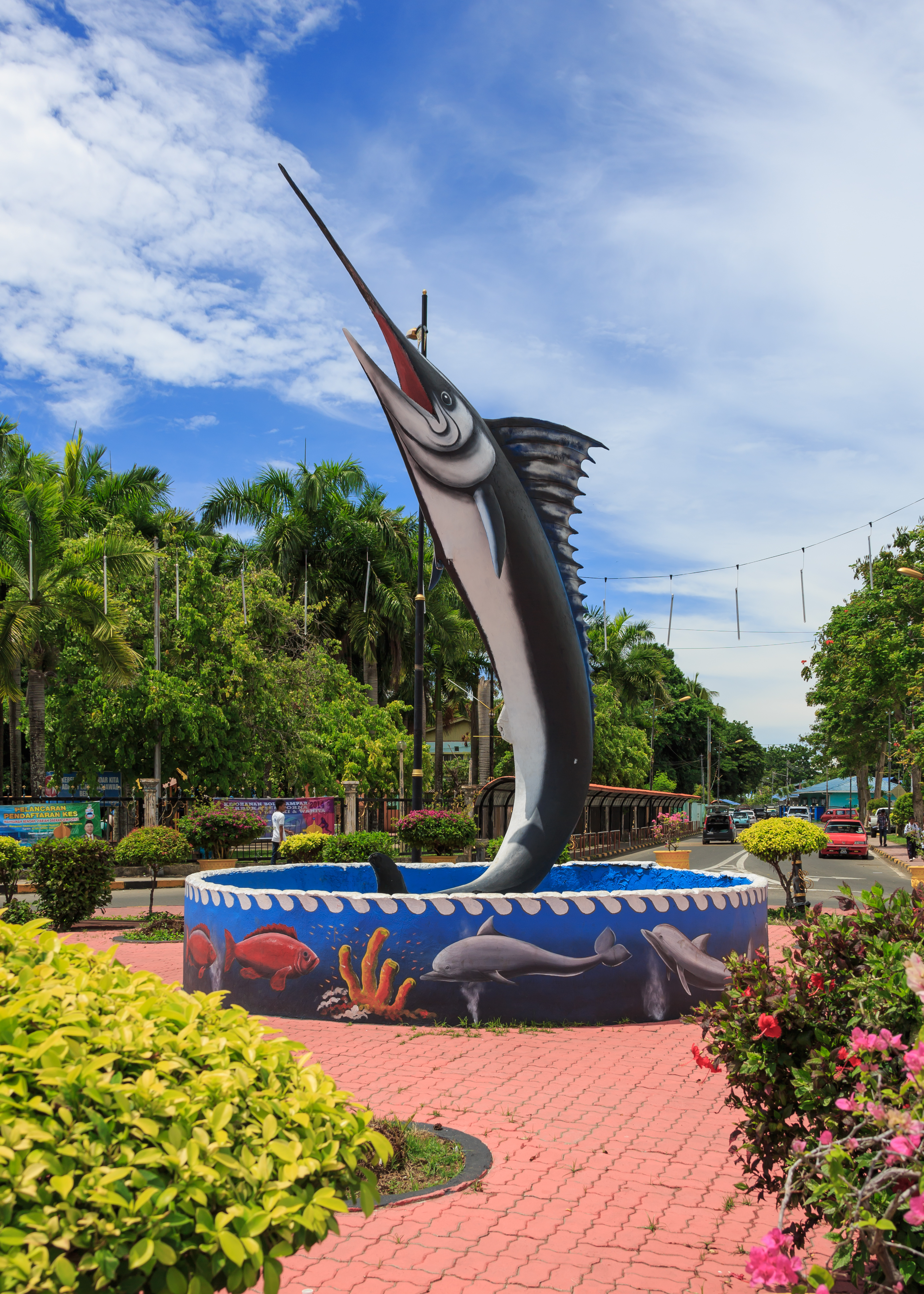
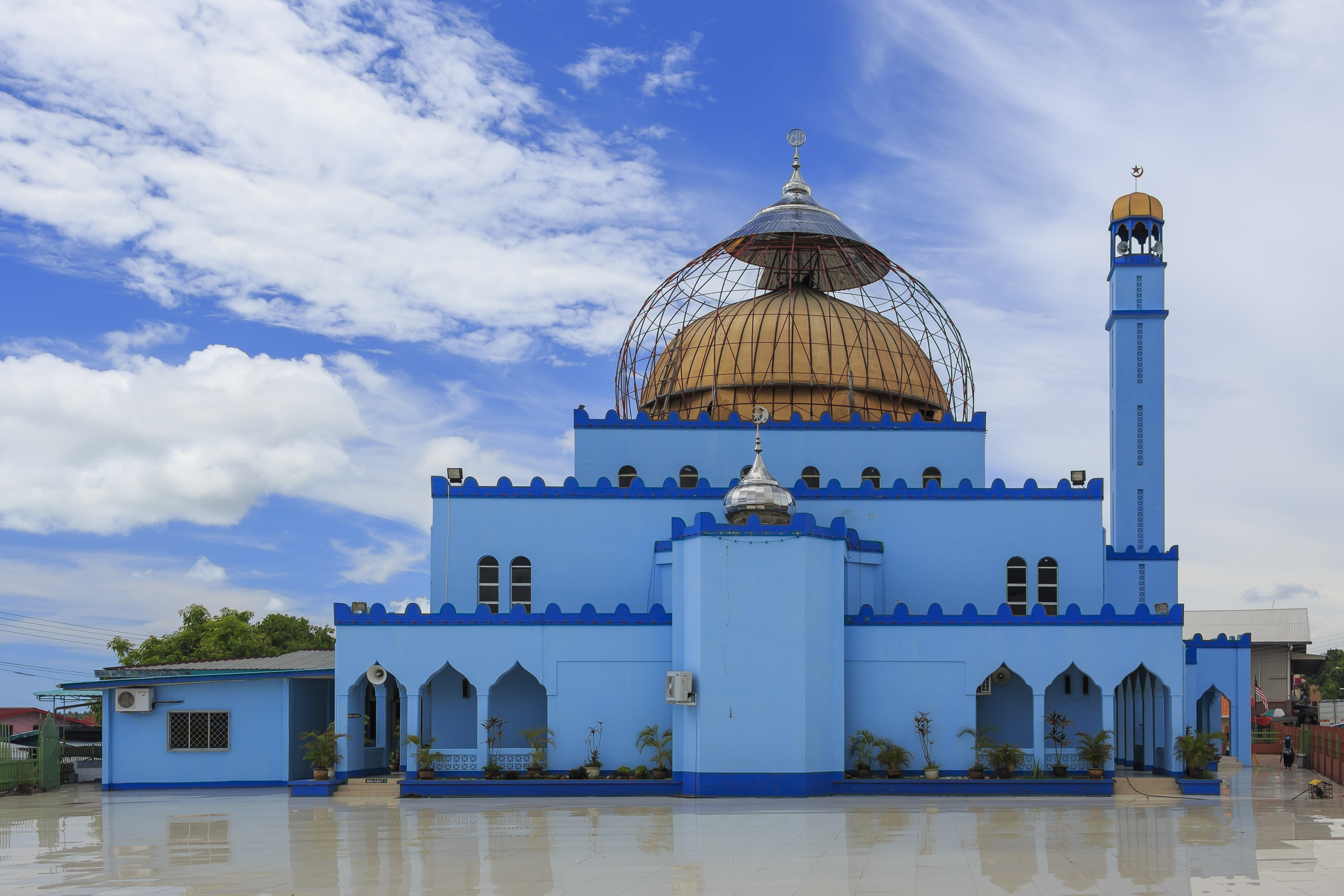
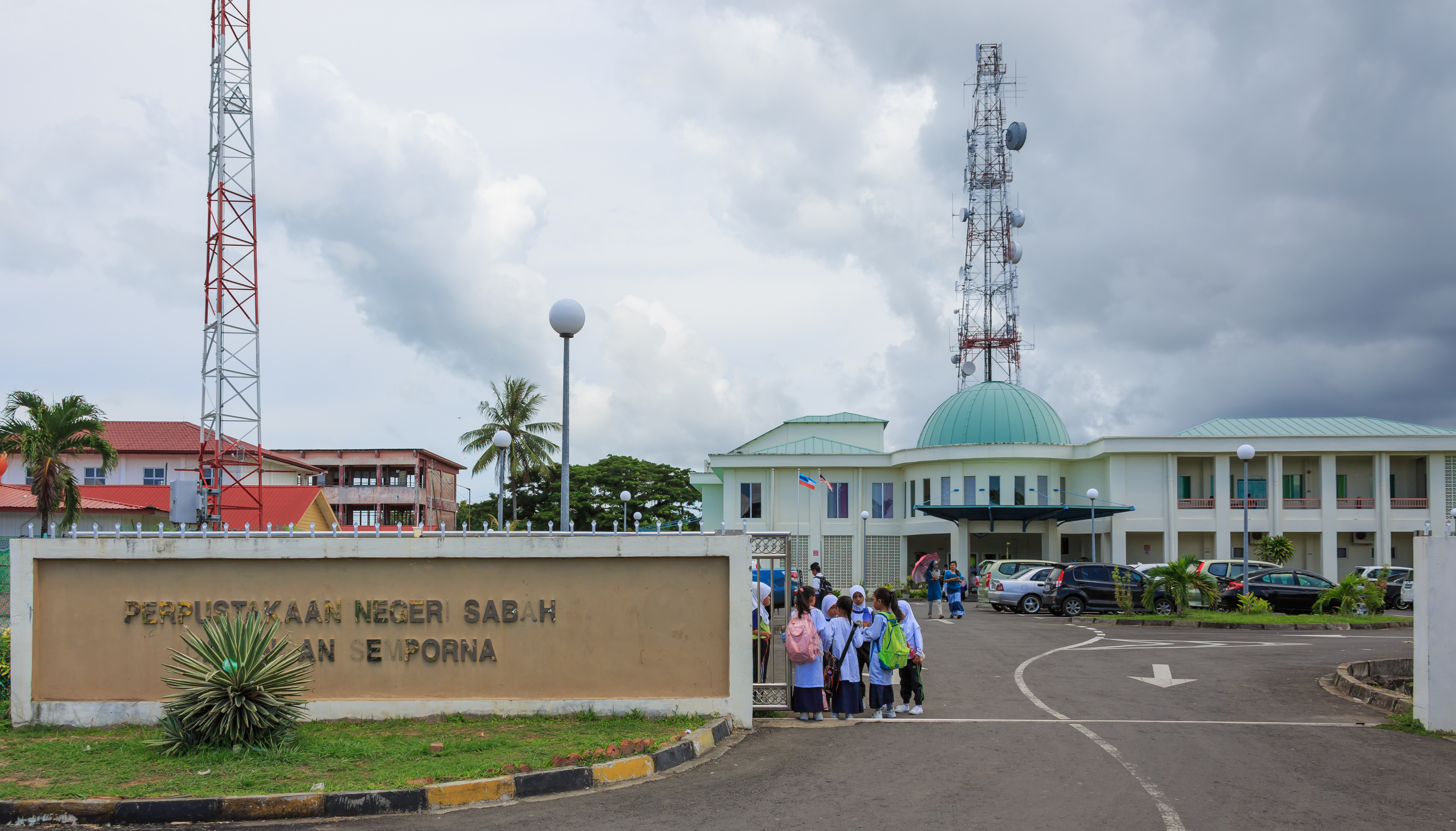
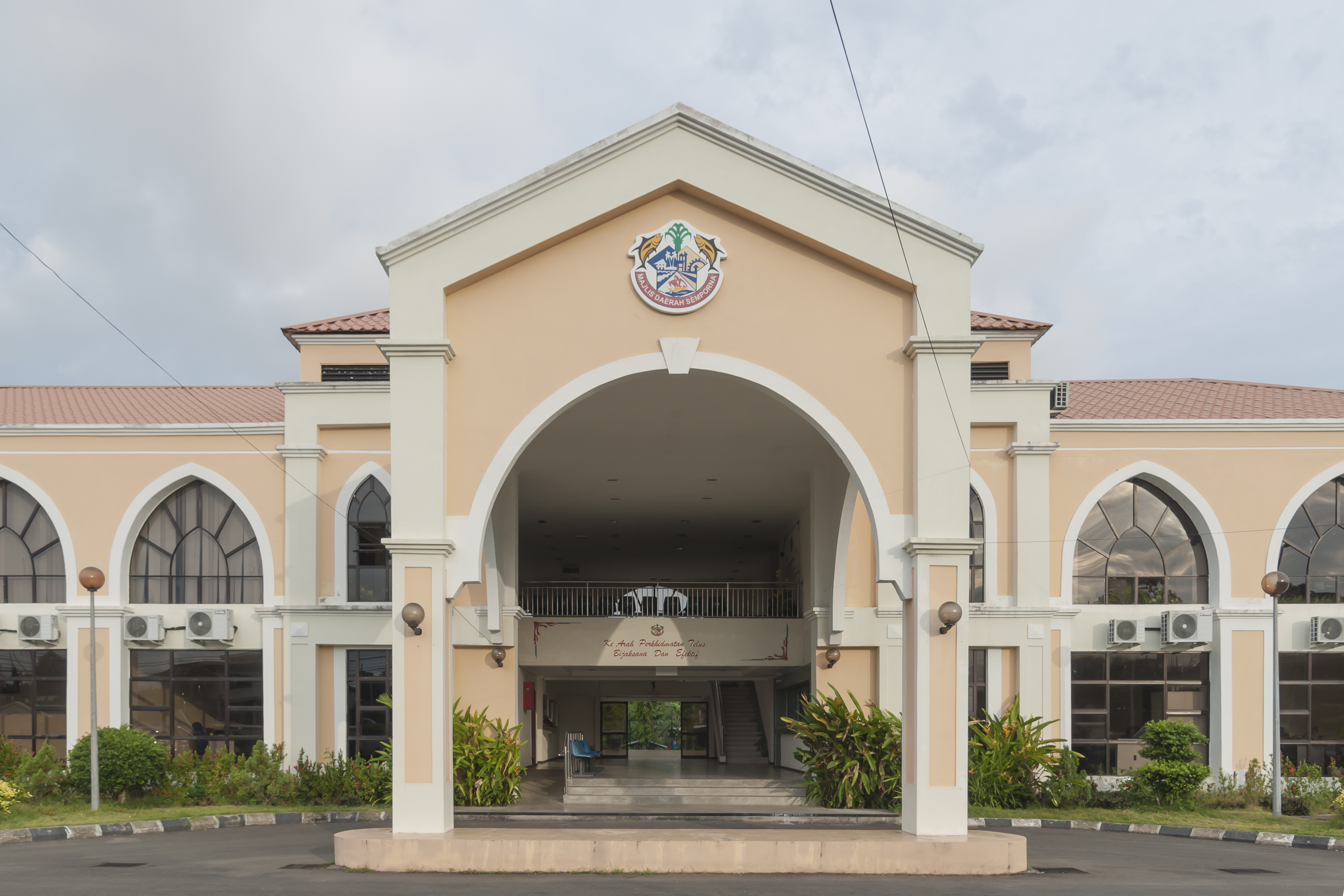
- From top, left to right: Semporna Waterfront, the Seafest Hotel, Semporna Roundabout, the City Mosque, the Semporna Regional Library, and the District Council Building

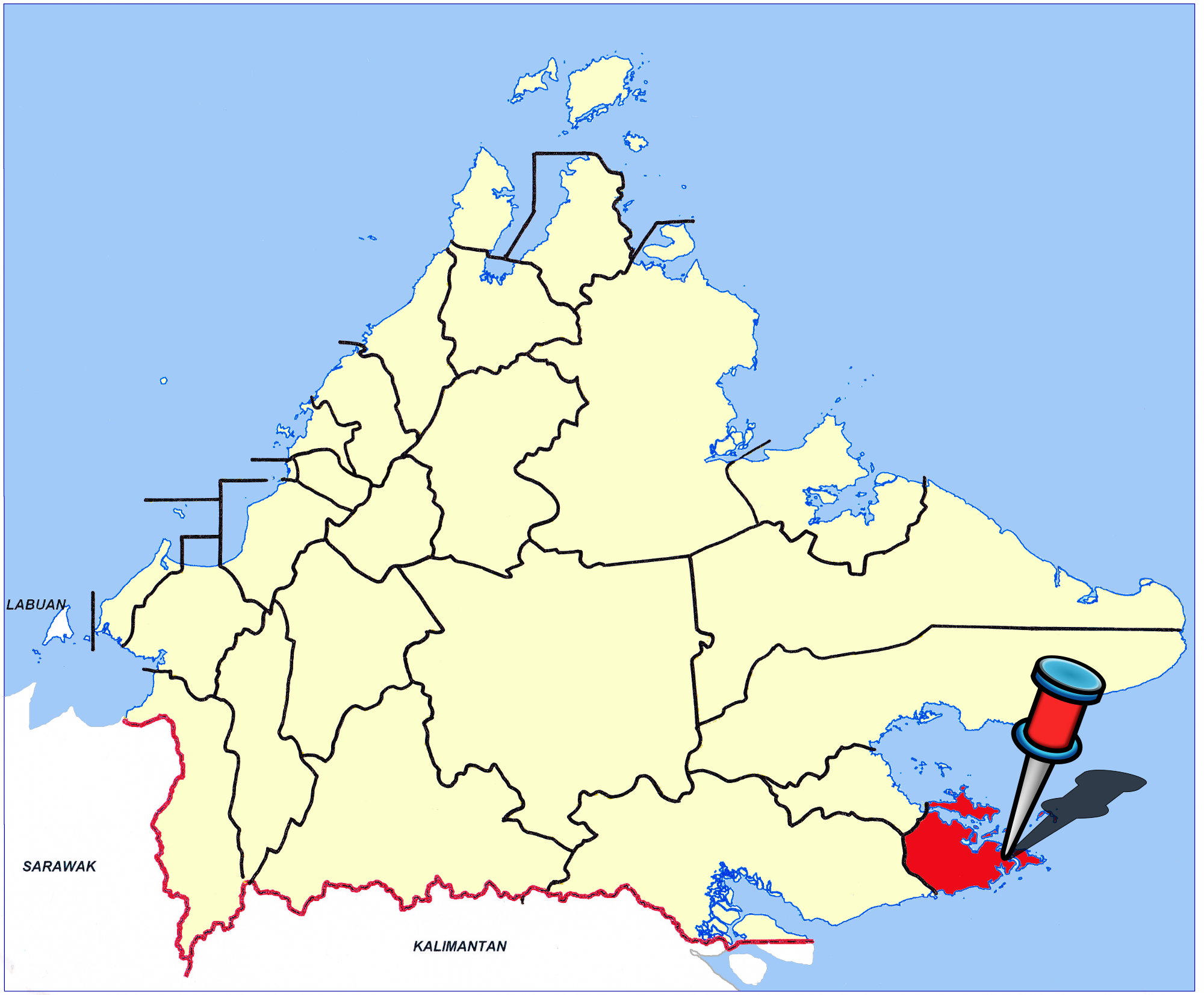
- Coordinates: 4°29′00″N 118°37′00″E
- Country: Malaysia
- State: Sabah
- Division: Tawau
- District: Semporna

Population (2010)
  - Total: 35,301

Semporna [səmˈpornə, səmˈporna] (Malay: Pekan Semporna) is the capital of the Semporna District in the Tawau Division of Sabah, Malaysia. Its population was estimated to be around 35,301 in 2010.

The federal constituency represented in the Dewan Rakyat is Semporna.

== History ==
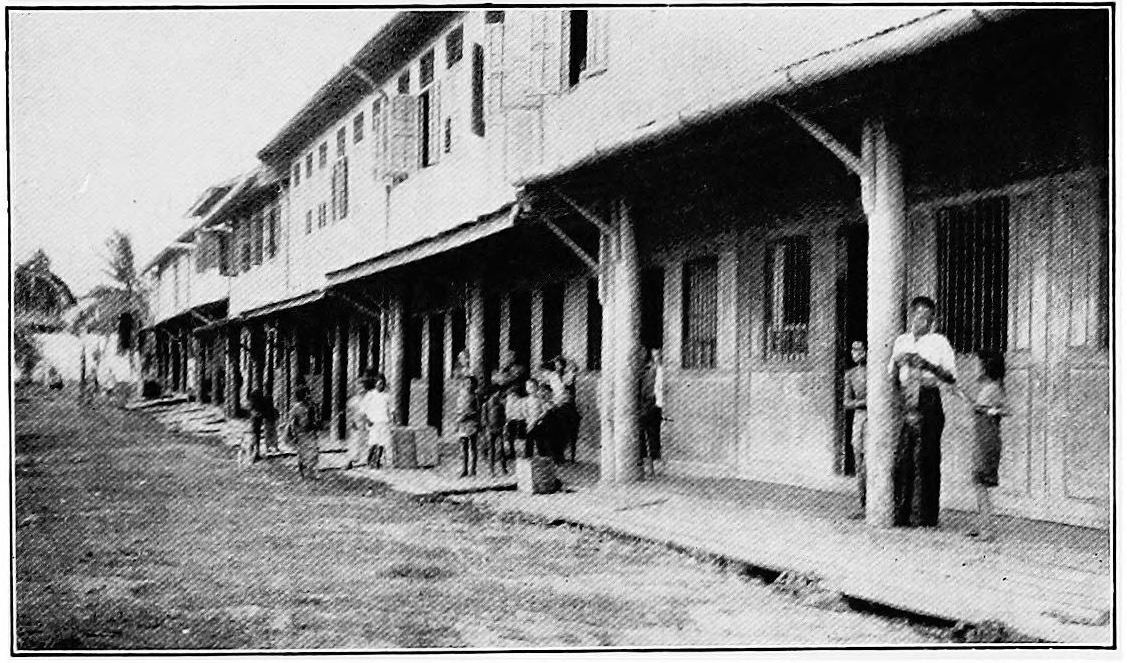
Semporna town in 1910, during the British period.

Semporna was founded soon after the British North Borneo Chartered Company established Sandakan, and initially settled by Chinese traders, most fleeing from Spanish attacks on the Sulu Sultanate. Before being named "Semporna", this area was known as "Tong Talun" in Bajau language which means "Hujung Hutan" in Malay or "at the end of the forest" in English. Panglima Uddang, Panglima Sallehangni and Panglima Sakti of Bajaus Kubang ancestry were responsible for this name. Governor Treacher renamed the place "Labuan Semporna" which is Malay for "perfect anchorage" but the word Labuan was subsequently dropped. Other sources translate "Semporna" as "Peaceful Place".

From that time on the area came under permanent British administration. Other western powers, including the Dutch, tried to conquer this area in June 1876 but were repelled by the British presence here.

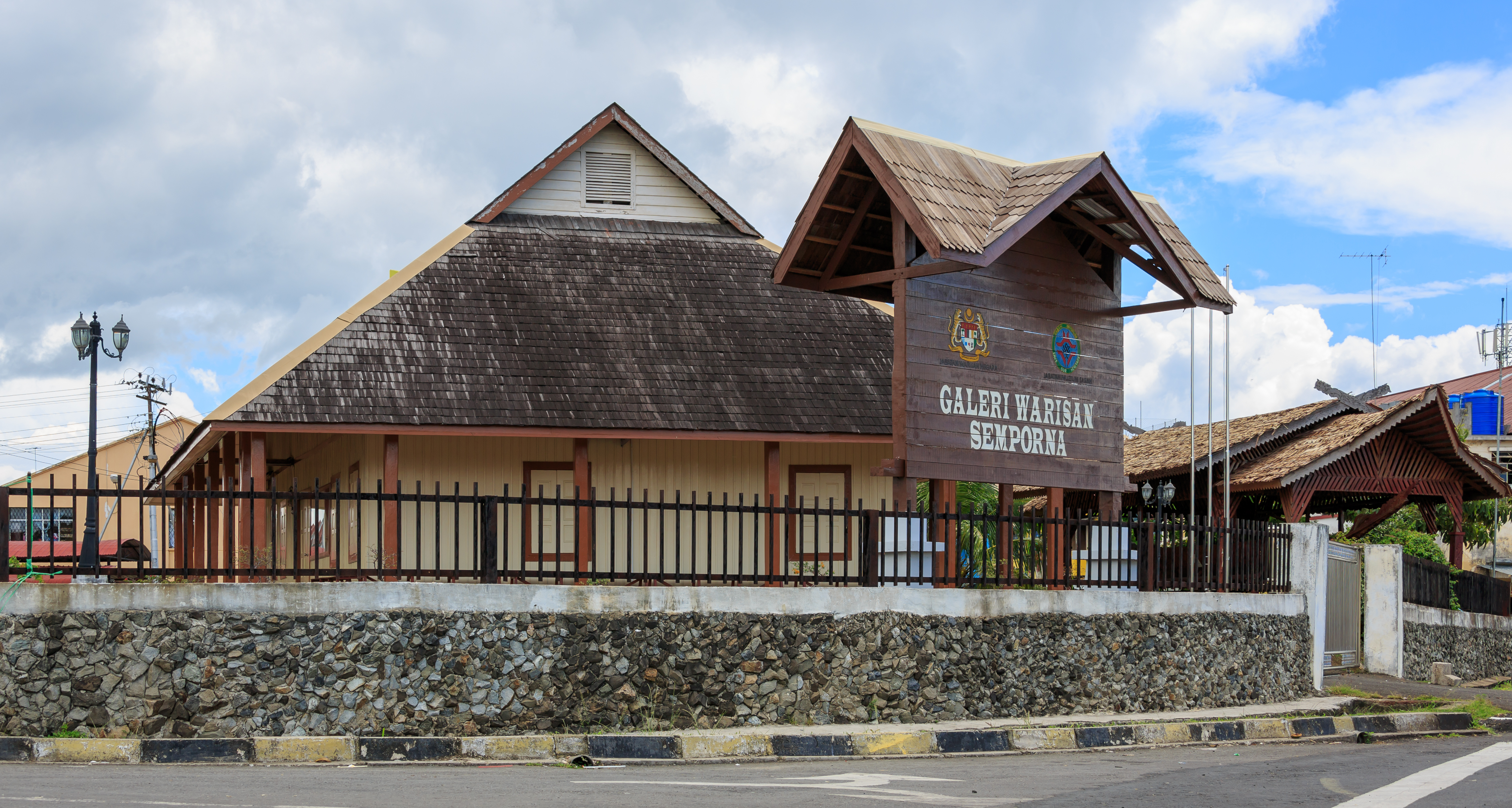
Galeri Warisan Semporna, a local museum. It was formerly the first District Office of Semporna. The museum was heavily damaged by a fire in December 2022.

This area also was long a main landing point for pirates. Very few people lived on the coasts for fear of these marauders, as they roamed the seas, kidnapping, raiding and killing. Action by Sir James Brooke, and other western colonial powers such as the Dutch and Spanish, managed to successfully combat the pirates over the course of the 1800s. Upon the advent of the Chartered Company in the early 1880s, only one pirate stronghold remained at Omadal island, which was defeated by HMS Zephyr in 1886. By mid 1887, a trading station on the southern side of the entrance to Darvel Bay was established. With pirates having recently destroyed the settlement of Maimbung in Sulu, some of the Chinese merchants there asked for permission to settle in the Company's territory, under the rule of law and its resulting security. Semporna was the site of a small-scale migration of Chavacano speakers from Zamboanga, fleeing the Malaysia-funded Moro Conflict between Muslim rebels and the Philippine government. These Chavacanos speak a Creole of Mexican-Spanish and are partially descended from Peruvian settlers mixed with indigenous Filipinos from the former Rajahnate of Sanmalan.

== Geography ==
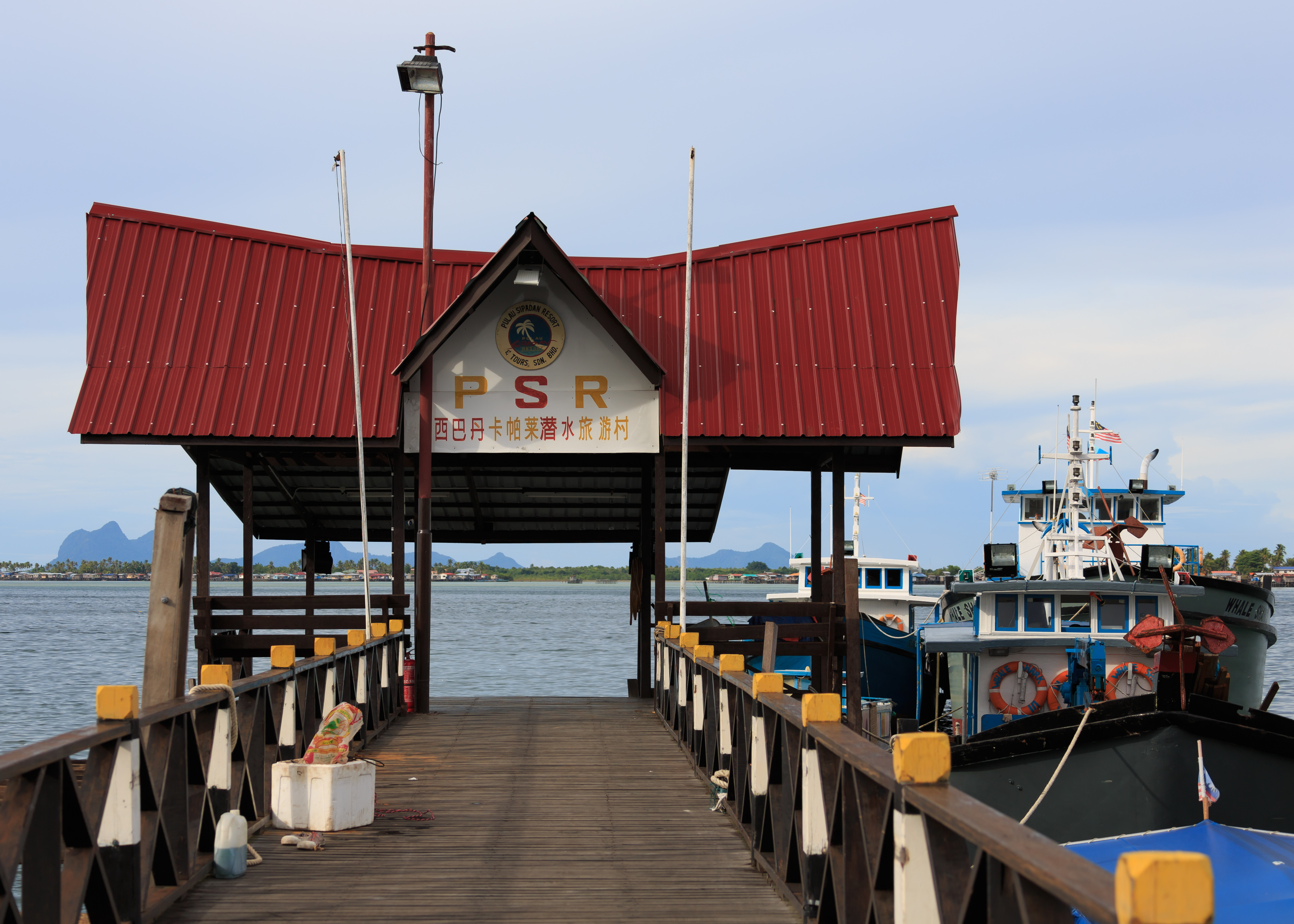
Jetty to Sipadan island resort.

Semporna is located at the tip of Semporna Peninsula around Lahad Datu Bay (also known as Darvel Bay), and is visited by tourists as a base for scuba diving or snorkelling trips to Pulau Sipadan (Sipadan Island), some 36 kilometres southeast of town.

== Climate ==
Semporna has a tropical rainforest climate (Af) with heavy rainfall year-round.

Climate data for Semporna
Month	Jan	Feb	Mar	Apr	May	Jun	Jul	Aug	Sep	Oct	Nov	Dec	Year
Mean daily maximum °C (°F)	29.6 (85.3)	29.7 (85.5)	30.2 (86.4)	30.9 (87.6)	31.4 (88.5)	31.3 (88.3)	31.3 (88.3)	31.5 (88.7)	31.3 (88.3)	31.2 (88.2)	30.7 (87.3)	30.1 (86.2)	30.8 (87.4)
Daily mean °C (°F)	26.2 (79.2)	26.3 (79.3)	26.6 (79.9)	27.0 (80.6)	27.3 (81.1)	27.2 (81.0)	27.0 (80.6)	27.1 (80.8)	27.0 (80.6)	27.0 (80.6)	26.8 (80.2)	26.5 (79.7)	26.8 (80.3)
Mean daily minimum °C (°F)	22.9 (73.2)	23.0 (73.4)	23.1 (73.6)	23.2 (73.8)	23.3 (73.9)	23.1 (73.6)	22.8 (73.0)	22.8 (73.0)	22.8 (73.0)	22.9 (73.2)	23.0 (73.4)	23.0 (73.4)	23.0 (73.4)
Average rainfall mm (inches)	201 (7.9)	136 (5.4)	135 (5.3)	149 (5.9)	210 (8.3)	183 (7.2)	160 (6.3)	163 (6.4)	124 (4.9)	180 (7.1)	194 (7.6)	190 (7.5)	2,025 (79.8)
Source: Climate-Data.org

== Demographics ==
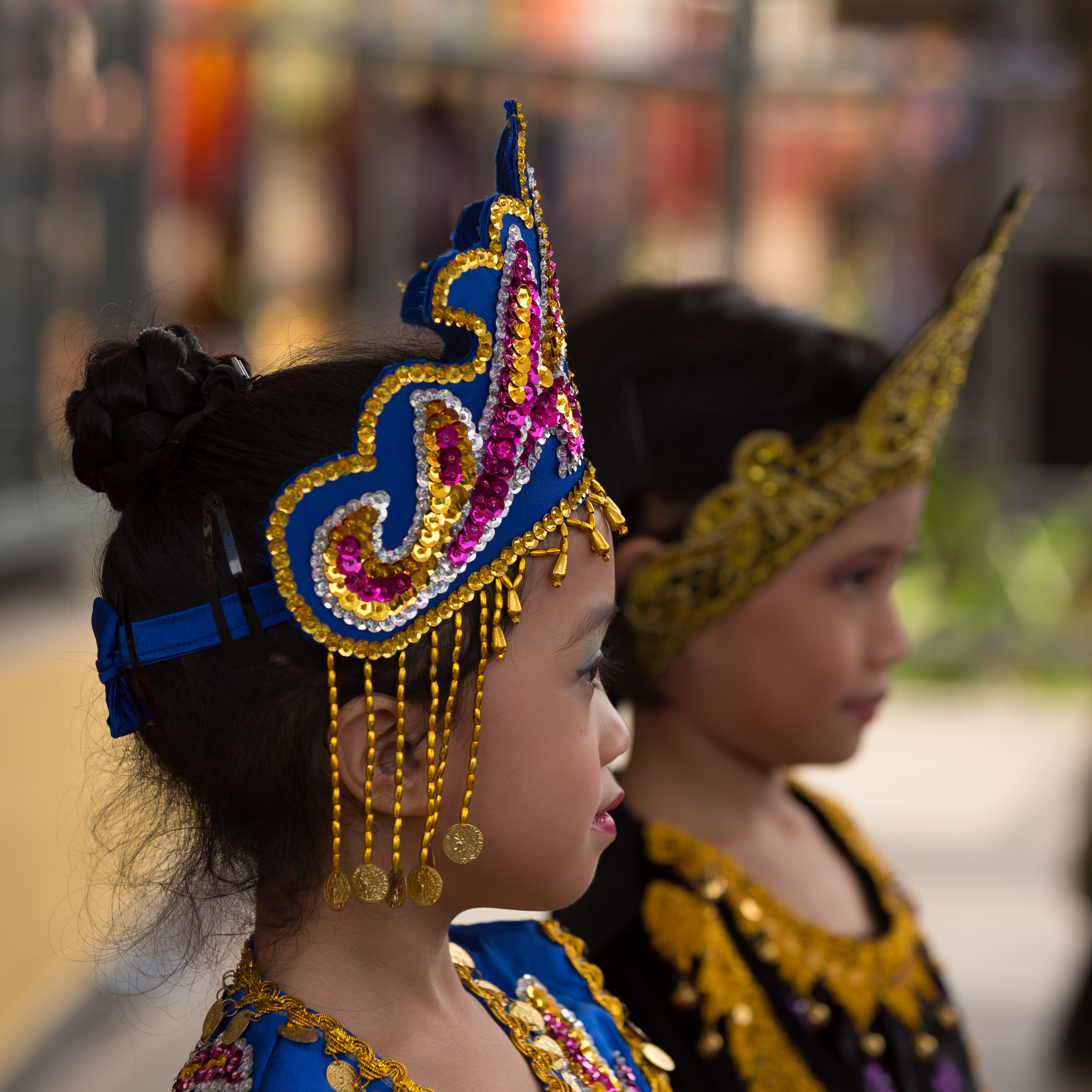
A girl in a traditional Bajau headgear

The majority of the population is Bajau, many of whom live in sprawling stilt villages over the water and land on the outskirts of town.

There are thousands of Bajau Laut (also known as Sea Gypsies or Pala'u) people live on the sea around Semporna. They are one of the few nomadic seaborne peoples of the world, and spend most of their lives on boats, making a livelihood from the coral reefs in the area. For some Bajau Laut people, the only time that their bodies spend any extended time on land is when they are buried after death.

Additionally, there are also large segments of populations Bajau Darat (Land Bajaus) in Semporna. They are nonmigrating, inhabiting the coastal areas and many adopted a land-based economy.

Among other large ethnic community in Semporna being the Suluk people. As in many places in Sabah and southern Philippines, the intermarriage between the Bajaus and Suluks are highly common in Semporna. Many of the Suluks and Bajaus in Semporna having a close family ties with their kins across the border in the Sulu Archipelago and Mindanao.

Other main ethnic minority populations in Semporna are the Filipinos and Chinese community. The majority of Chinese people in Semporna are from the Hakka ethnic group.

=== Religion ===
Islam is the most represented religion with 85% of the citizens being Muslim, followed by Christian with 12.45%, while Buddhists represent 1% of residents.

=== Languages ===
Sabah Malay creole is the lingua franca in Semporna, with the Sempornan-Sabahan Malay having a strong influence from the Bajau language.

Semporna is also home to the only Chavacano-speaking community in Malaysia. Semporna's Chavacano speakers are refugees (or descendants of refugees) who fled the Moro conflict of the Philippines. A large number of these refugees live in Malaysia illegally. Chavacano is a co-official language in Semporna.

== Economy ==
Marine products are still the mainstay of the local economy, as well as tourism. Pearl culturing is a major component of this industry.

== Tourism ==
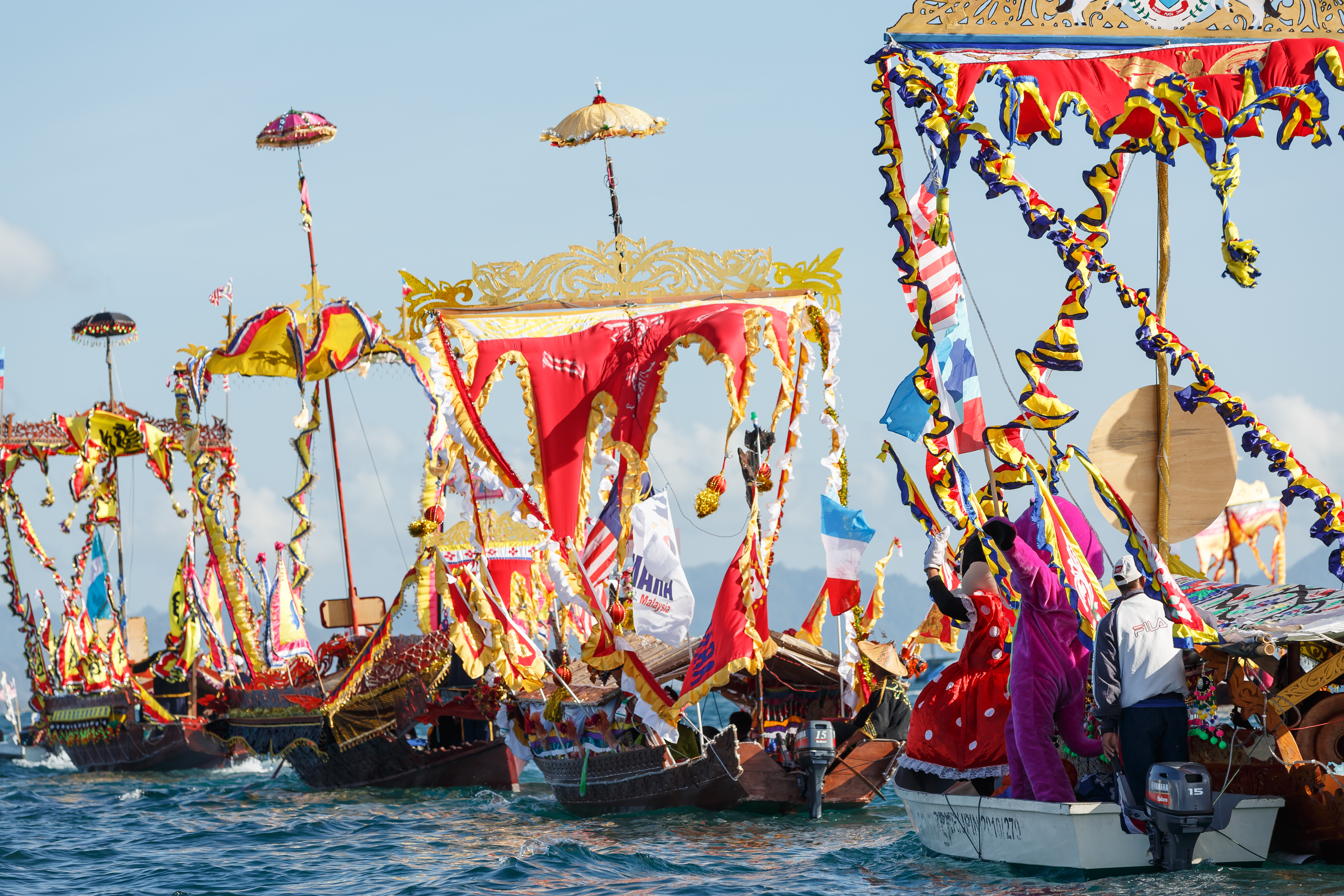
Colourful yachts during the Regatta Lepa-Lepa celebrations, one of the most important cultural festivals among the Bajau community in Semporna

Semporna is also known for the Regatta Lepa traditional boat races which occur annually in April. Semporna was also the location of the finish line of Eco-Challenge: Borneo, held in 2000. Off the coast is a marine park called Tun Sakaran Marine Park, also known as Semporna Islands Park. It was gazetted by Sabah Parks in 2004.

Semporna is the gateway to diving in world-renowned island paradises like Sipadan, Mabul, Kapalai, Mataking, Sibuan, Mantabuan, Siamil and Pom Pom among others. Visitors to Semporna are mainly sunseekers looking for relaxation or watersports activities such as scuba diving or snorkelling.

=== Cuisine ===
As Semporna is a coastal town, the local cuisine is largely influenced by seafood and marine produce.
