= Semporna District =

Semporna District Daerah Semporna
- District
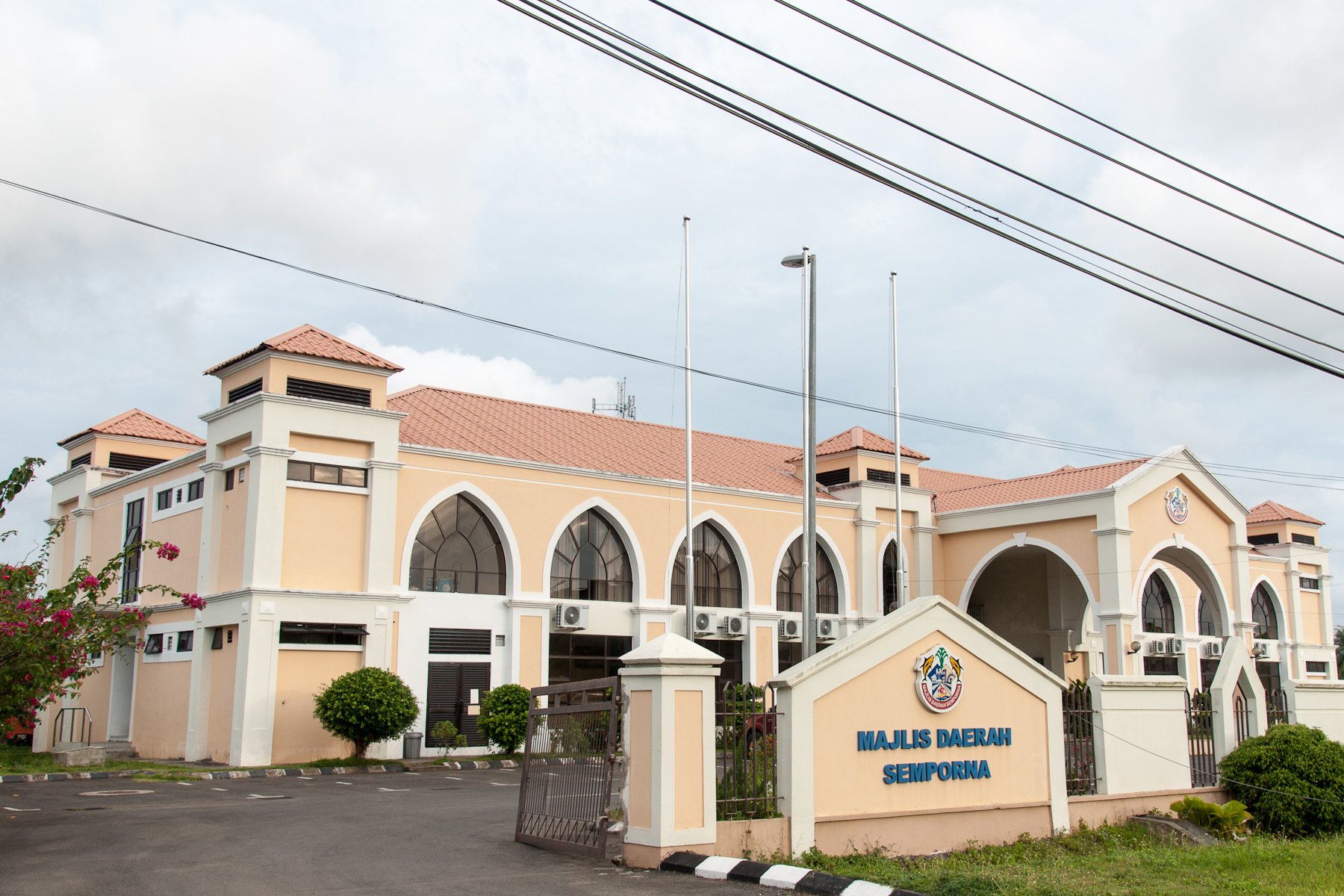
- Semporna District Council office.

- Seal

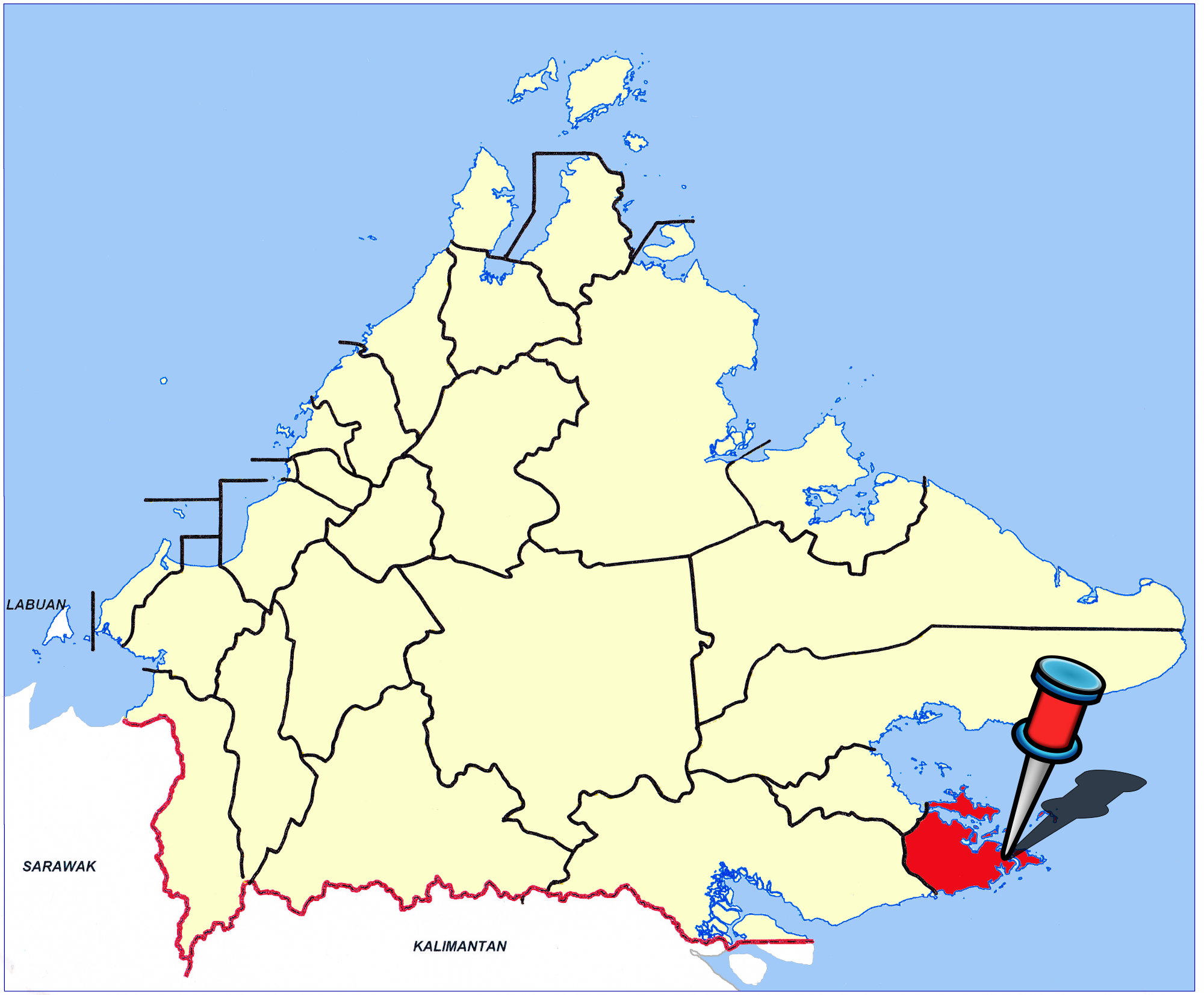
- Coordinates: 4°29′00″N 118°37′00″E
- Country: Malaysia
- State: Sabah
- Division: Tawau
- Capital: Semporna

Government
  - District Officer: A.M. Ibnu Haji A.K. Baba

Area
  - Total: 1,145 km^{2} (442 sq mi)

Population (2010)
  - Total: 133,164
- Website: mdsemporna.sbh.gov.my pdsemporna.sbh.gov.my

Map of Semporna District

The Semporna District (Malay: Daerah Semporna) is an administrative district in the Malaysian state of Sabah, part of the Tawau Division which includes the districts of Kunak, Lahad Datu, Semporna and Tawau. The capital of the district is in Semporna Town.

== Demographics ==
According to the last census in 2010, the population of Semporna district is estimated to be around 133,164 inhabitants. As in other districts of Sabah, there are a significant number of illegal immigrants from the nearby southern Philippines, mainly from the Sulu Archipelago and Mindanao.

== Climate ==
Climate data for Semporna
Month	Jan	Feb	Mar	Apr	May	Jun	Jul	Aug	Sep	Oct	Nov	Dec	Year
Mean daily maximum °C (°F)	29.6 (85.3)	29.7 (85.5)	30.2 (86.4)	30.9 (87.6)	31.4 (88.5)	31.3 (88.3)	31.3 (88.3)	31.5 (88.7)	31.3 (88.3)	31.2 (88.2)	30.7 (87.3)	30.1 (86.2)	30.8 (87.4)
Daily mean °C (°F)	26.2 (79.2)	26.3 (79.3)	26.6 (79.9)	27.0 (80.6)	27.3 (81.1)	27.2 (81.0)	27.0 (80.6)	27.1 (80.8)	27.0 (80.6)	27.0 (80.6)	26.8 (80.2)	26.5 (79.7)	26.8 (80.3)
Mean daily minimum °C (°F)	22.9 (73.2)	23.0 (73.4)	23.1 (73.6)	23.2 (73.8)	23.3 (73.9)	23.1 (73.6)	22.8 (73.0)	22.8 (73.0)	22.8 (73.0)	22.9 (73.2)	23.0 (73.4)	23.0 (73.4)	23.0 (73.4)
Average rainfall mm (inches)	201 (7.9)	136 (5.4)	135 (5.3)	149 (5.9)	210 (8.3)	183 (7.2)	160 (6.3)	163 (6.4)	124 (4.9)	180 (7.1)	194 (7.6)	190 (7.5)	2,025 (79.8)
Source: Climate-Data.org

== Gallery ==
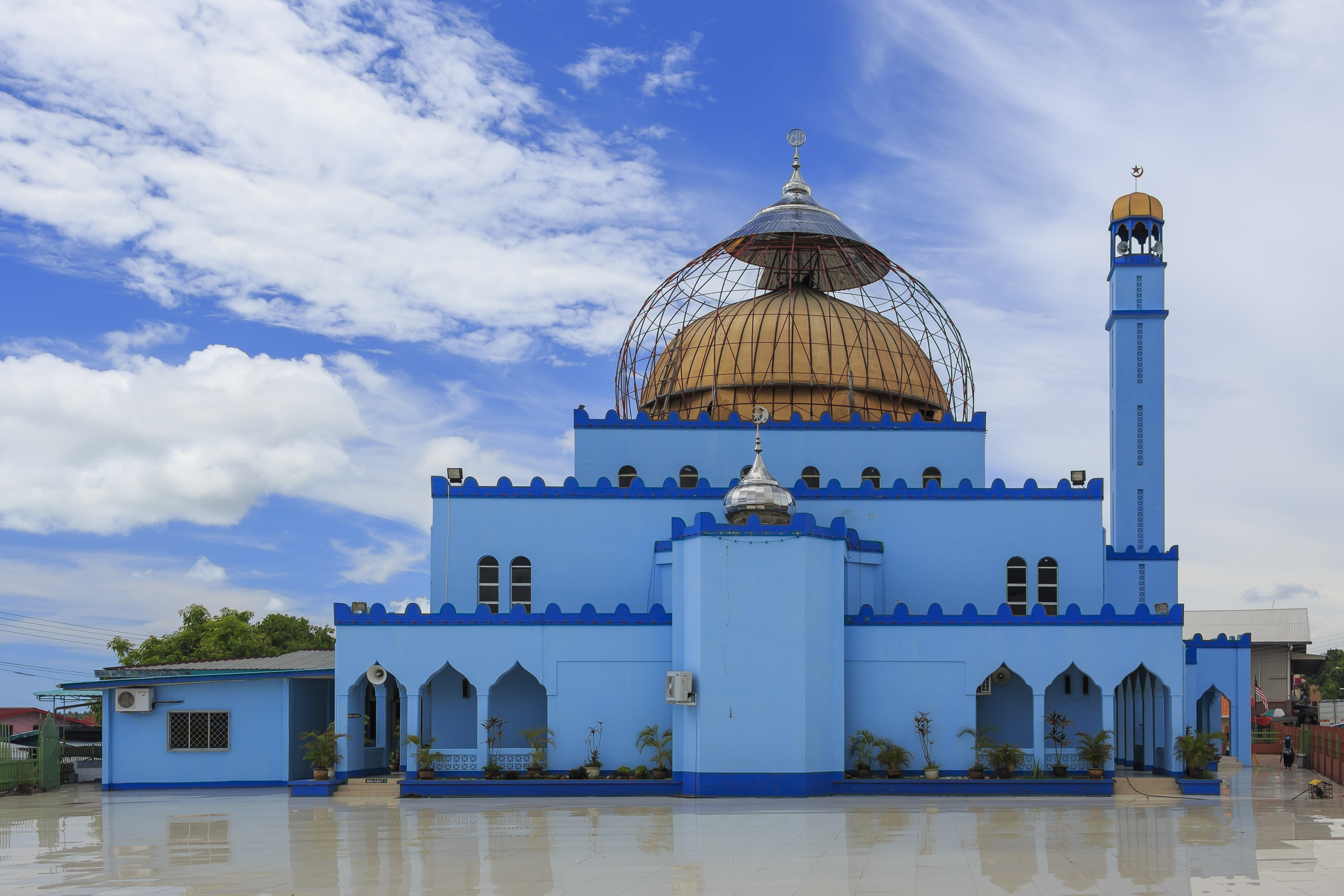
Semporna Town Mosque.

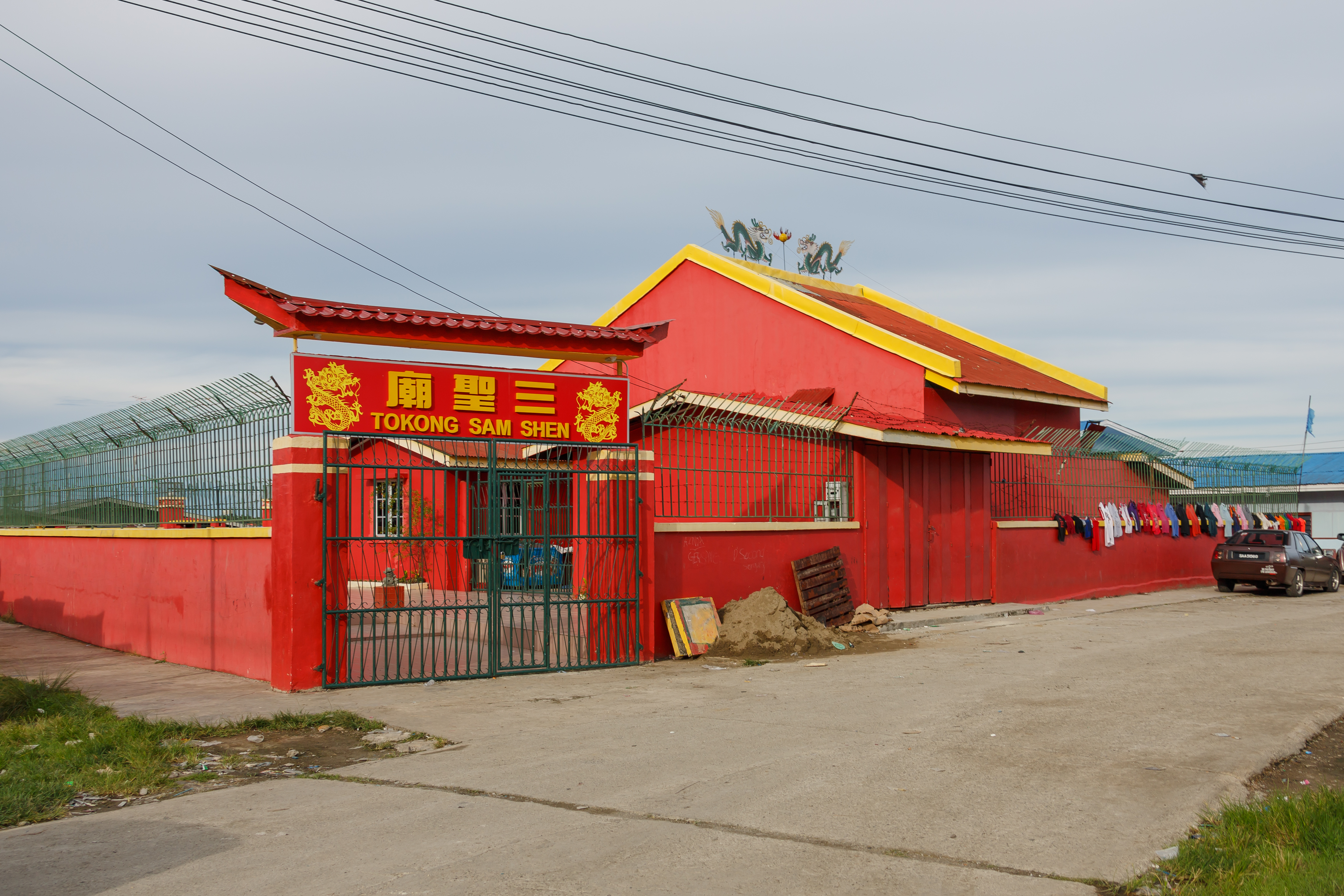
Sam Shen Temple.

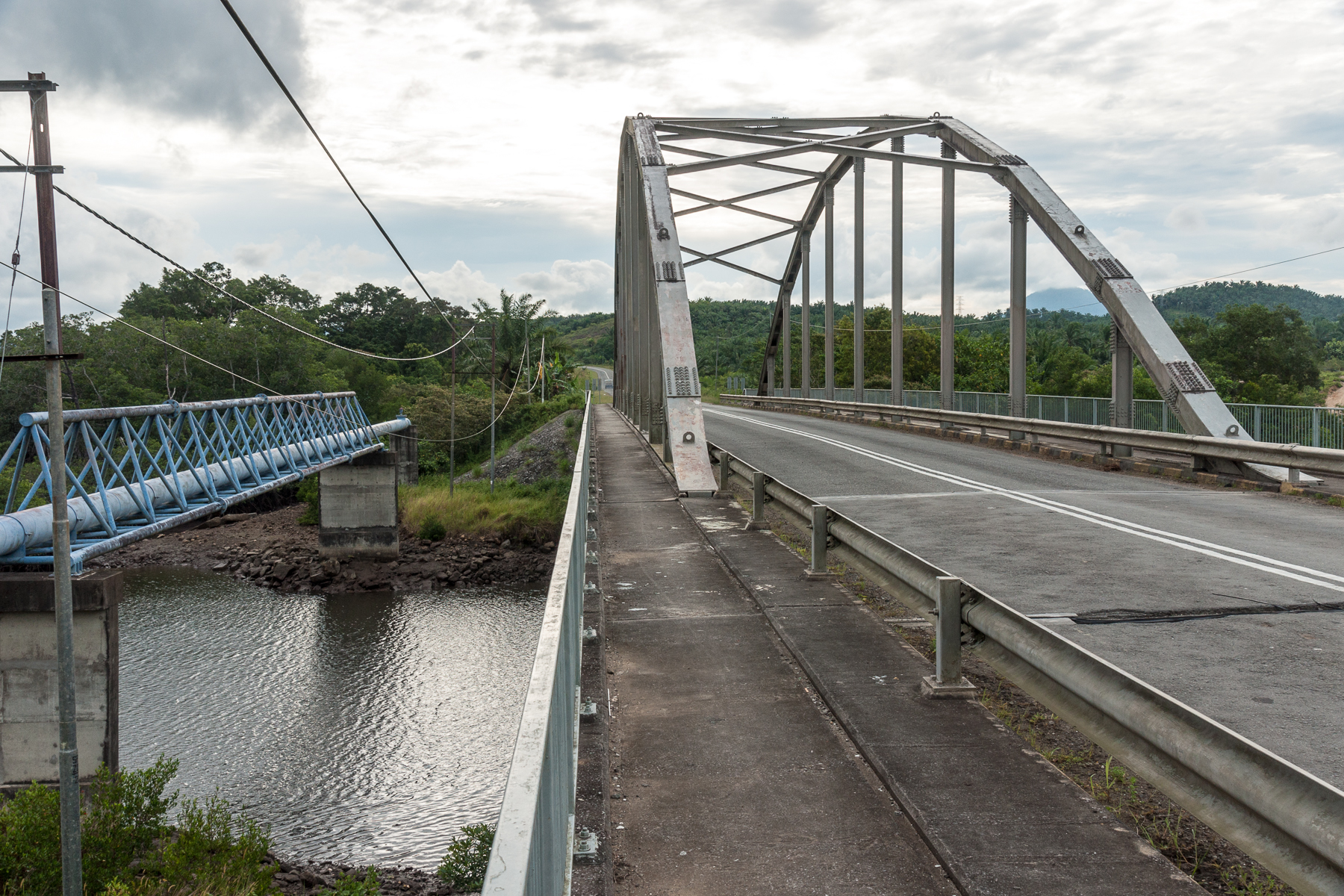
Pegagau Bridge.

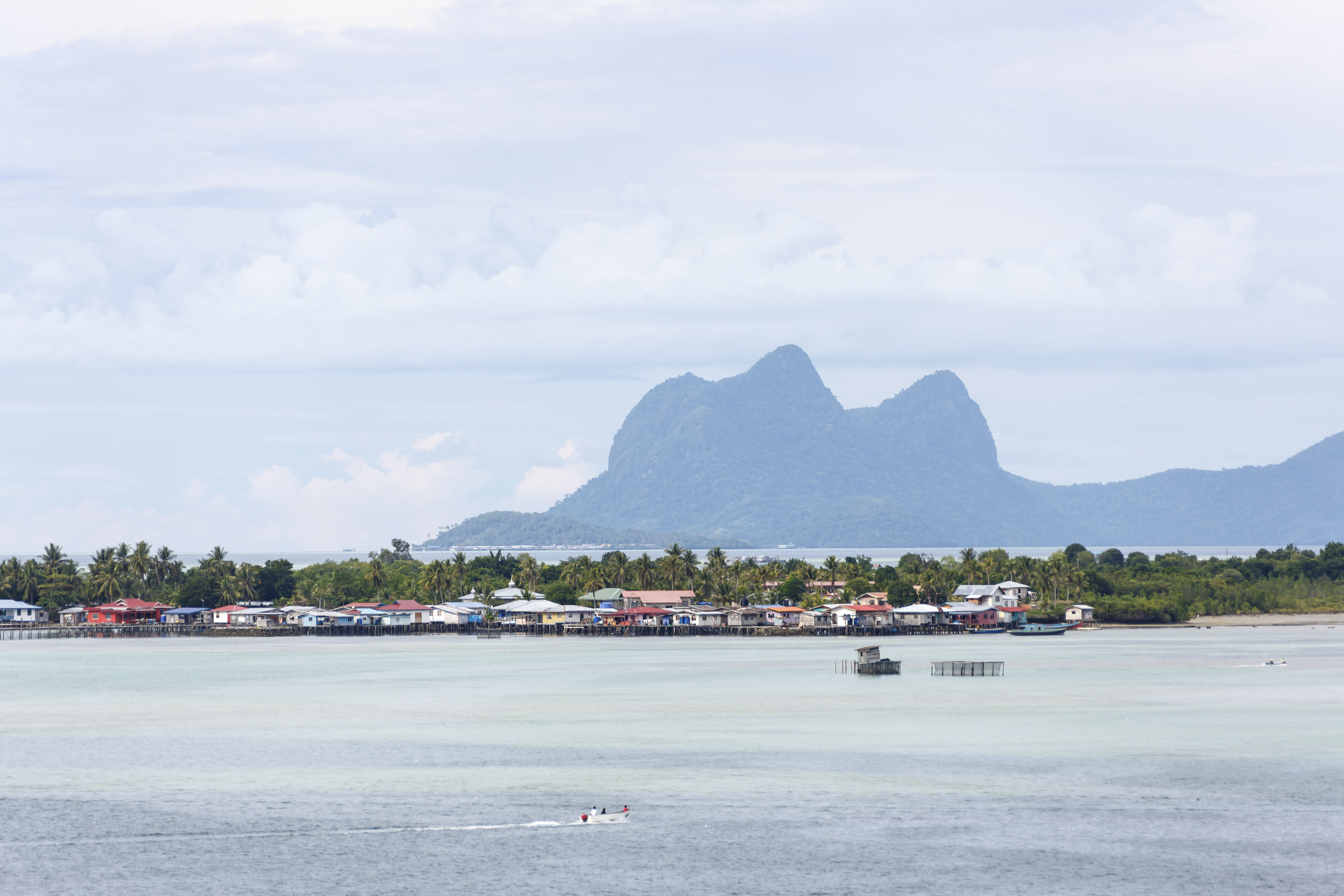
Balimbang Asal.

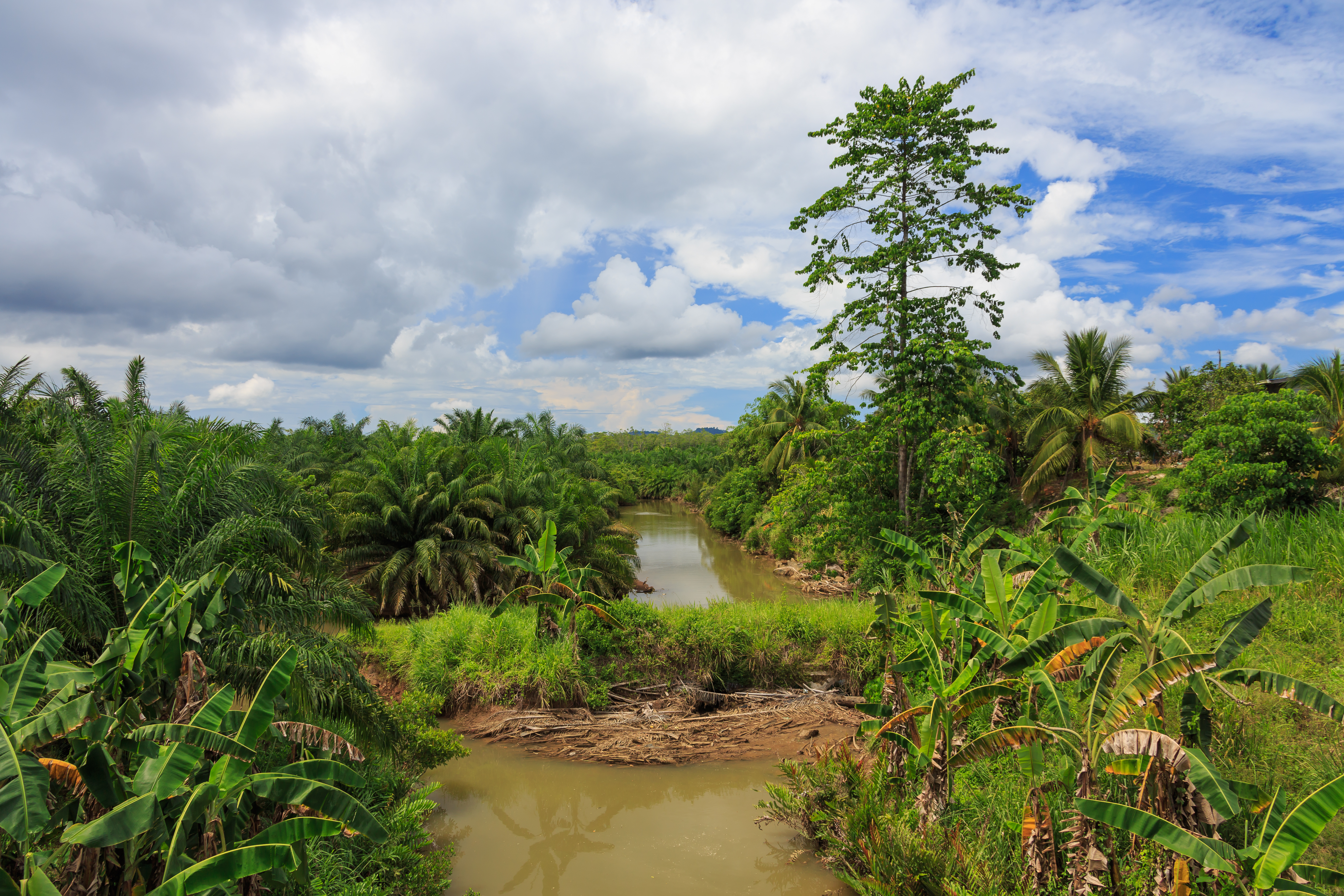
Gading River.

== See also ==
- Districts of Malaysia
