= Batik Kulambu Island =

Island in Malaysia

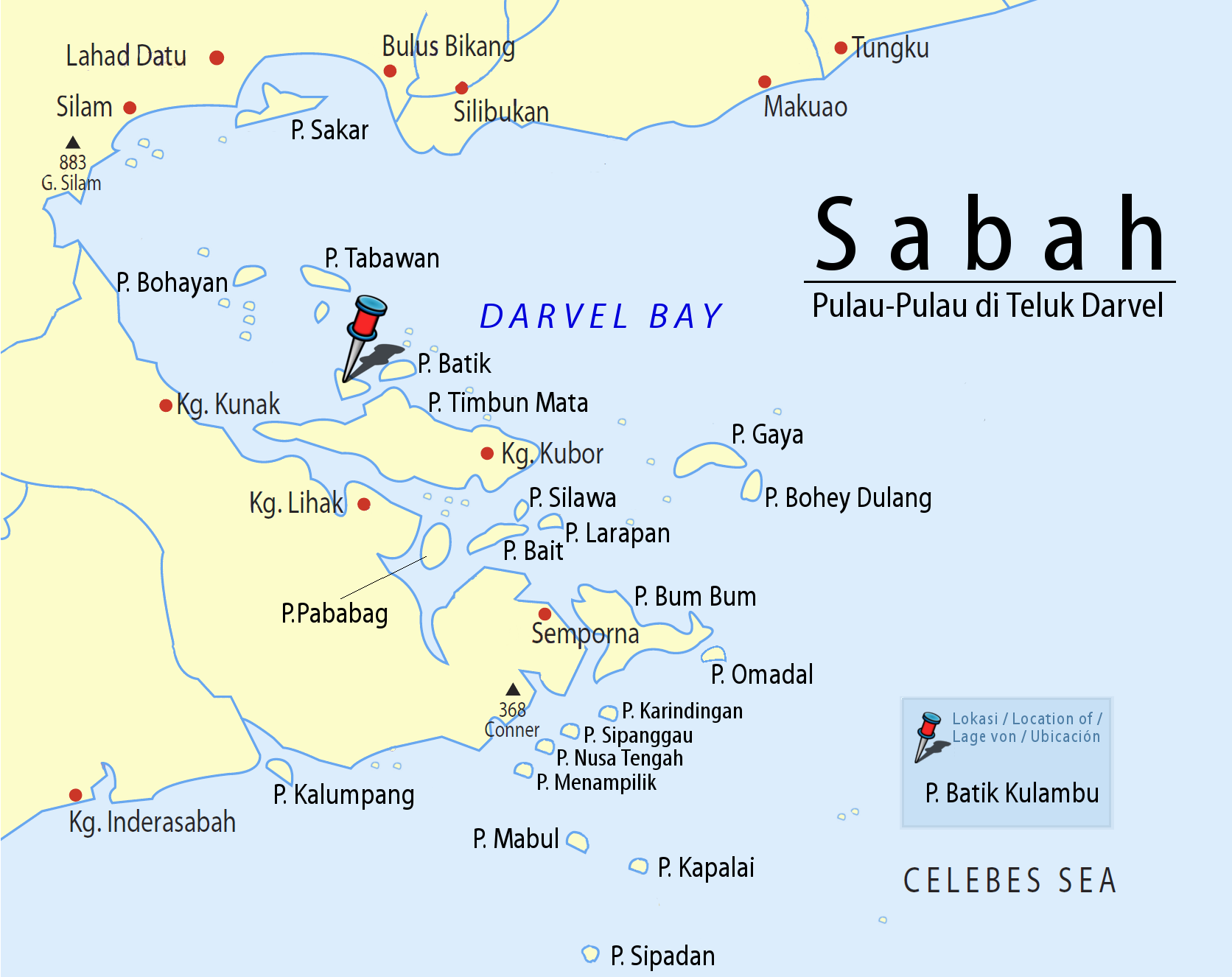
- Location of Batik Kulambu Island in Darvel Bay
- Interactive map of Batik Kulambu Island

Geography
- Coordinates: 4°42′0″N 118°24′0″E
- Highest elevation: 249 m (817 ft)

Administration
- Malaysia
- State: Sabah
- Division: Tawau
- District: Semporna

Batik Kulambu Island (Malay: Pulau Batik Kulambu) is a Malaysian island located in Darvel Bay, about 8 kilometres off Kunak in the state of Sabah. The island extends for about 4.9 kilometres from east to west and about 2 kilometres from north to south. The highest point is 249 metres above sea level to the tops of the trees. A narrow channel to the south-east separates Batik Kulambu from the larger island of Timbun Mata.

== See also ==
- List of islands of Malaysia
