= Billean Island =

Island in Malaysia

- Interactive map of Billean Island

Geography
- Coordinates: 6°37′0″N 117°46′1″E

Administration
- Malaysia
- State: Sabah
- Division: Sandakan
- District: Beluran

Billean Island (Malay: Pulau Billean) is an island located in eastern Sabah on the Sulu Sea on Malaysia. It is part of the Sugud Islands Marine Conservation Area (SIMCA) together with Lankayan and Tegaipil.

== See also ==
- List of islands of Malaysia
