= Pom Pom Island =

Island in Malaysia

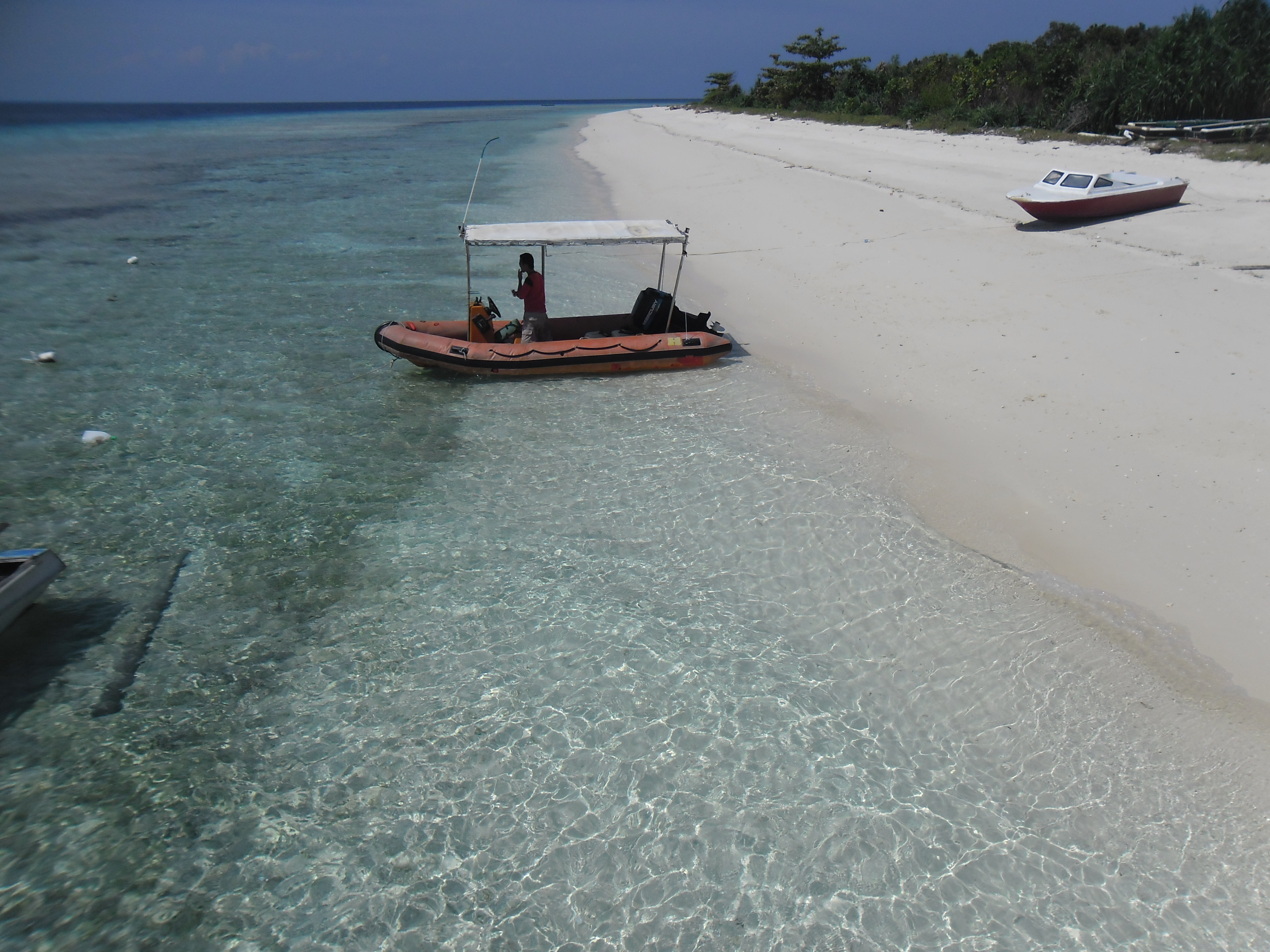
- Pom Pom Island beach
- Interactive map of Pom Pom Island

Geography
- Location: Sulu Sea
- Coordinates: 4°35′45″N 118°51′52″E

Administration
- Malaysia
- State: Sabah
- Division: Tawau
- District: Semporna

Pom Pom Island (Malay: Pulau Pom Pom) is a small coral reef island in the Celebes Sea approximately 30 kilometres north east of Semporna town, Sabah, East Malaysia.

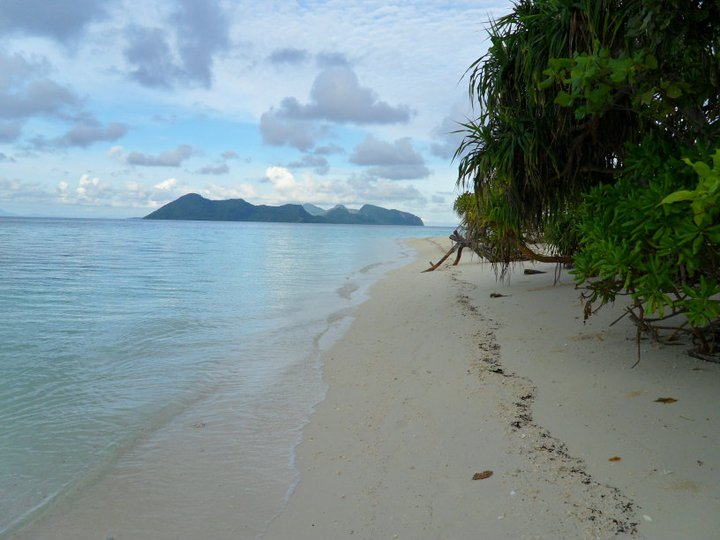
Pom Pom Island beach looking towards Tun Sakaran Marine Park

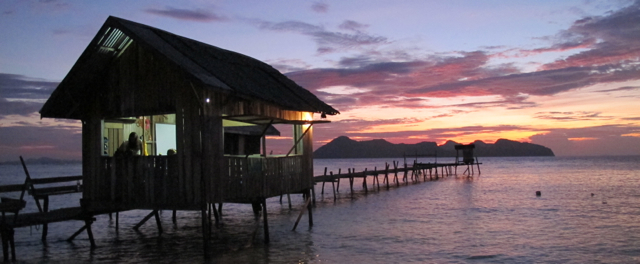
TRACC classroom on the fishermans jetty

The island is 2.3 kilometres in circumference at the high tide line with a fringing coral reef 4 kilometres long. The island is flat sand with a maximum elevation of less than 2 metres above the HT line. The reef flat is only 50–75 metres wide to the west and several hundred metres wide around most of the island. The island has a white sand coral beach and is a significant nesting location site for green and hawksbill turtles. Relatively undeveloped, the island is one of the most popular dive destinations in the Semporna district.

== Geography ==
There are six islands to the northeast of Semporna, outside the Tun Sakaran Marine Park. The presence of turtle nesting links the island. The islands are mostly separated by deep water and are all surrounded by a fringing coral reef with minimal lagoon development. There are coastal stilt villages on Kalapuan and Bohayan islands, while the other islands have fewer inhabitants. There are operational resorts on Pom Pom Island, Mataking and Kalapuan, while resorts are planned for Timba Timba and Pandanan islands.

Pom Pom is being eroded from the northeast side and to stabilise the shoreline, the Pom Pom Island Resort has built a long sea wall at the high tide line.

== History ==
Both Pom Pom and Mataking islands were featured in the second edition of the Swedish reality competition, Expedition Robinson, or Survivor as it is referred to in some countries.

== Biodiversity ==
=== Terrestrial ===
Pom Pom island is densely wooded with small trees, especially from the pandanus family. There are no monitor lizards or snakes, though these are found on the other islands.

=== Marine ===
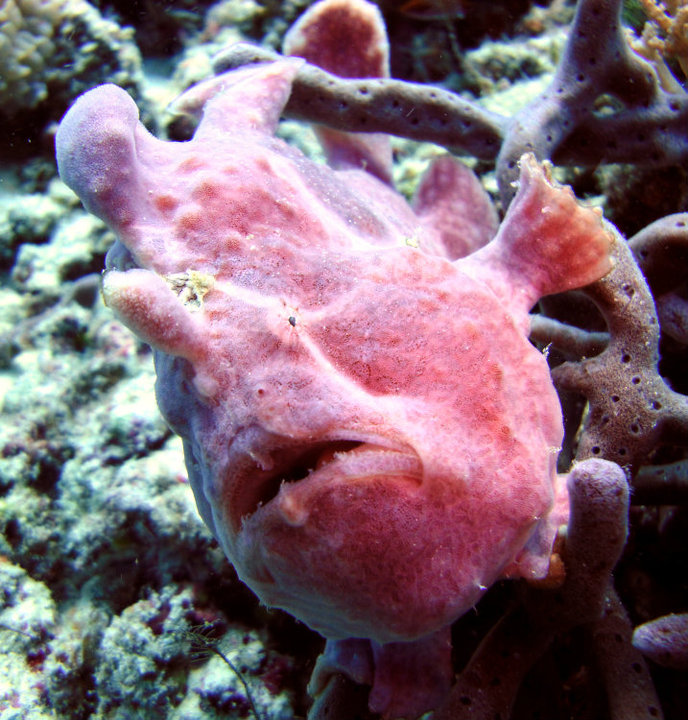
Giant Frog Fish

The marine biodiversity of Pom Pom Island is rich with many rare and uncommon species. The region is part of the coral triangle which has 500-plus coral species. A recent study by UMS, WWF, Sabah Parks and Naturalis Biodiversity Center, Netherlands in the nearby Tun Sakaran Marine Park found a record 43 species of mushroom corals and suggested that the region may have the world's highest marine biodiversity: “At some of the more diverse reefs, fish species counts rivalled the highest counts that the fish team found in the Philippines and were greater than what they have encountered in Indonesia.” The fish team encountered 844 species of fish in Semporna.

The ongoing survey by TRACC's based on Pom Pom island, has a fish count of 220+ species and a coral count of over 250 species. The northeast Semporna islands are part of the Sulu-Sulawesi Marine Ecoregion and have been prioritised by the WWF's and the Fisheries Department of Sabah.

Pom Pom island is an important nesting and feeding site for green and hawksbill turtles. All the 6 northeast Semporna Islands are nesting beaches and many of the stakeholders in the area are working towards better protecting the turtles and reef environments. The green turtle nests year-round but peak nesting is May to September. The hawksbill nests in small numbers. Both turtles are present on the reef throughout the year with an average of 7 green turtles seen per hour on a dive or snorkeling trip. The hawksbill is both less common and more territorial with individuals being regularly seen at the lobster wall, the North Tip and Magic Rocks.

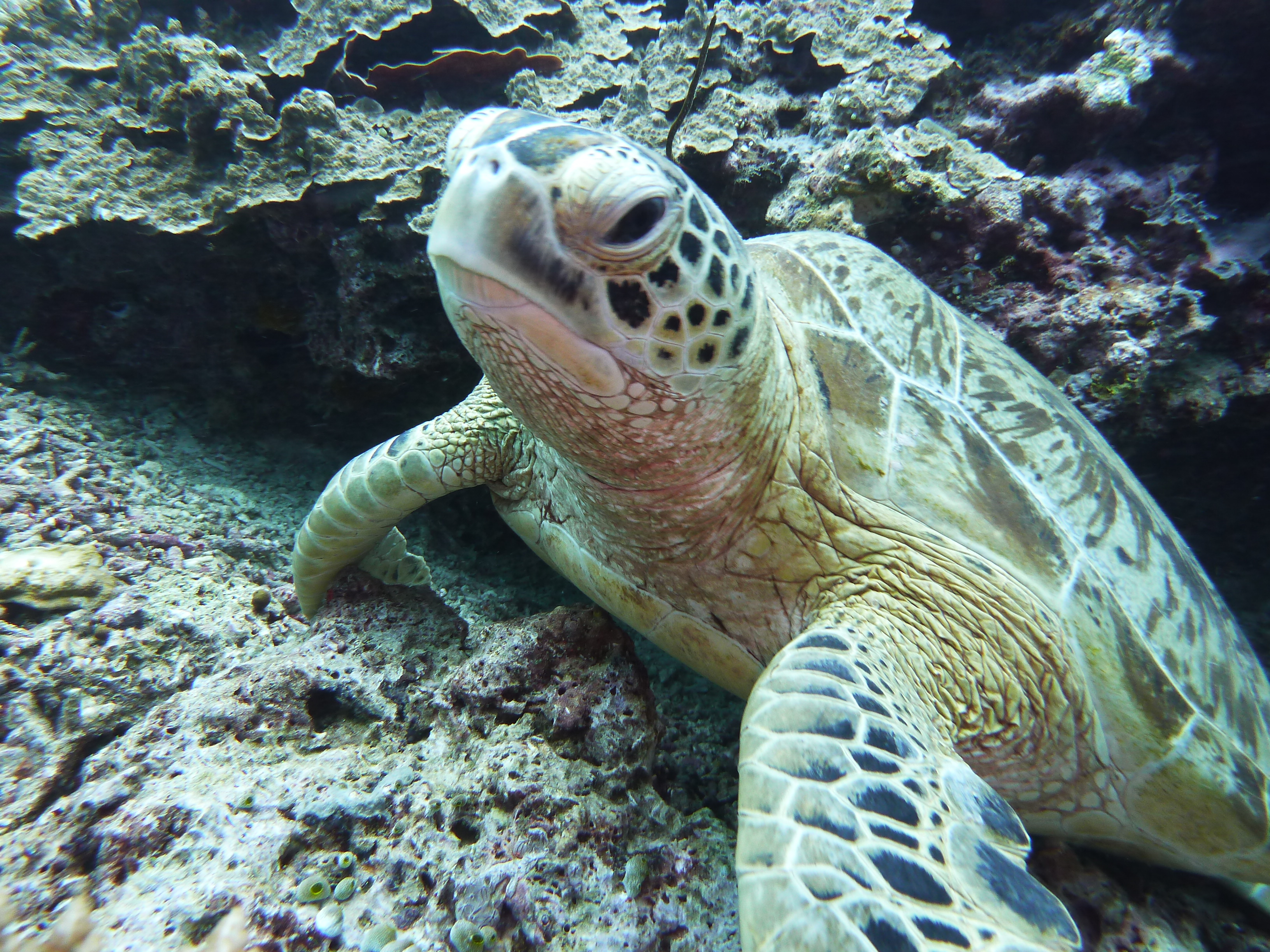
Green Turtle

The areas of the Celebes Sea between Mabul and Kapalai to the south of Pom Pom, Mataking, and the Tun Sakaran Marine Park in the north are rich in exotic small marine life. These areas are within the coral triangle. Flamboyant cuttlefish, blue-ringed octopus, mimic octopus, wonderpus and bobtail squids can be found on the reefs. Many types of gobies can be found including the spike-fin goby, black sail-fin goby and metallic shrimp goby. Frogfish are abundant, with giant, painted and clown frogfish are regularly seen along with most species of the whole scorpion fish family.

== Activities ==
=== Diving ===
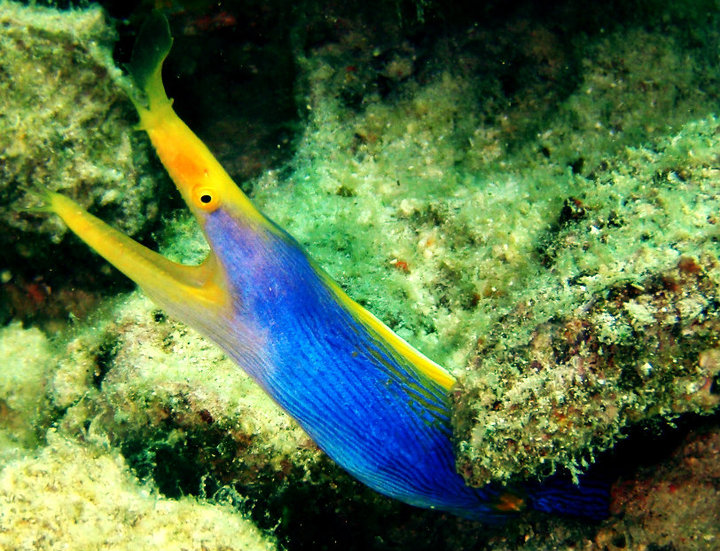
Blue ribbon Eel

The reef is on the edge of the continental shelf and the seabed surrounding the reef slopes out to 100 to 130 m deep. There are deep, nearly vertical, walls starting at 27-30m deep located at the northern tip, eastern plateau, and lobster wall. Depending on the tide, the current at these locations can be strong, offering excellent drift dives with many seafans and pelagic fish. There are two dive resorts, (Pom Pom Resort and Celebes Beach Resort), and a marine conservation project Tropical Research and Conservation Centre (TRACC) operating on Pom Pom island.

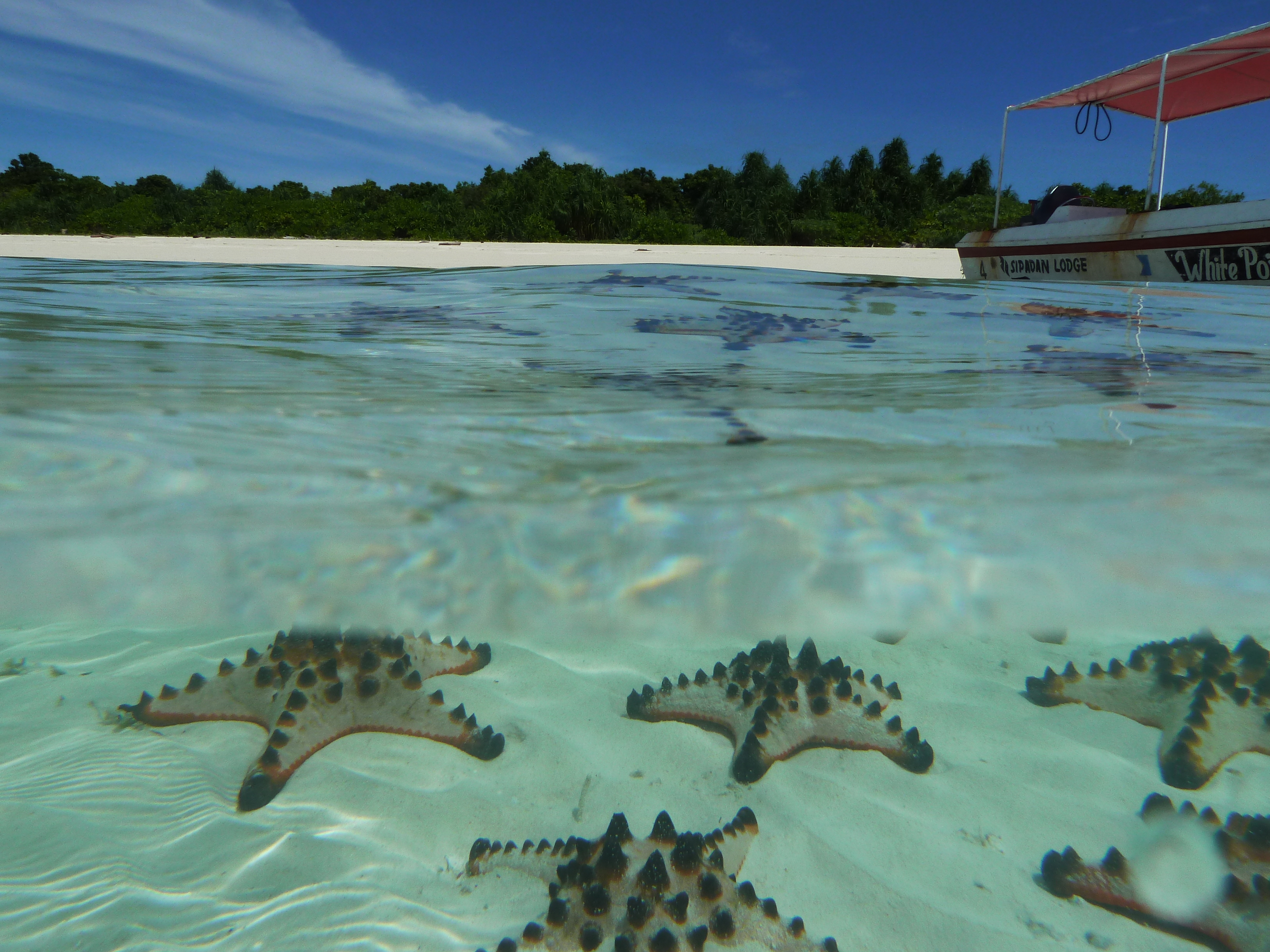
Starfish in lagoon

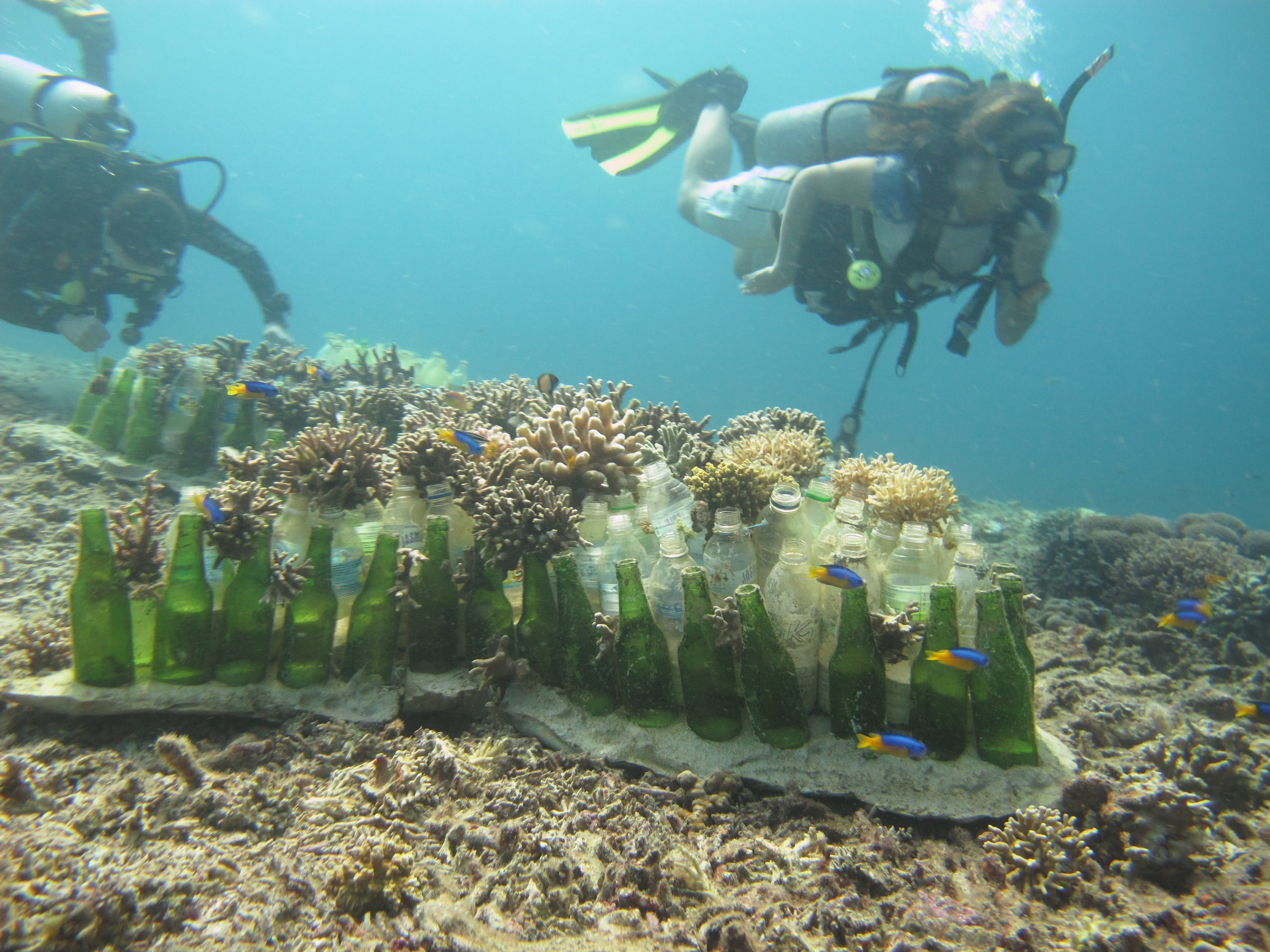
Replanted reef using bottles

The island is a macro divers' paradise with many small creatures located in the shallows in front of the resorts. The protection from the resorts and coral planting by TRACC has helped to reduce fishing and increase the numbers and diversity of fish species. The water varies from 25 to 29 degrees C, with good visibility. The island lies below the monsoon belt and gets good weather all year; while there are occasional short squalls during thunderstorms, they rarely last more than an hour.

The two resorts provide a variety of PADI courses, dives & accommodation for recreational scuba divers. Marine science students and marine conservation volunteers are working underwater to replant the reef, based at the TRACC Expedition camp.

=== Getting to the island ===
There is no public transport to the island. Resorts transport their own guests, and TRACC arranges transport for its own students and volunteers. There are occasional day trips from dive centres in Semporna. A boat trip there takes 35–60 minutes on resort boats.

== 2013 kidnappings ==
On 15 November 2013, a group of Abu Sayyaf militants raided a resort on the island. During the ambush, a couple from Taiwan was at the resort when one was shot dead by the militants and the other was kidnapped and taken to the Sulu Archipelago in the southern Philippines. The victim was later freed in Sulu Province by Philippine security forces.

== See also ==
- List of islands of Malaysia
