= Tegaipil Island =

Island in Malaysia

- Interactive map of Tegaipil Island

Geography
- Coordinates: 6°33′0″N 117°43′1″E

Administration
- Malaysia
- State: Sabah
- Division: Sandakan
- District: Beluran

Tegaipil Island (Malay: Pulau Tegaipil) is an island located in eastern Sabah on the Sulu Sea on Malaysia. It is part of the Sugud Islands Marine Conservation Area (SIMCA) together with Billean and Lankayan.
