= Tabawan Island =

Island in Darvel Bay, Sabah, Malaysia

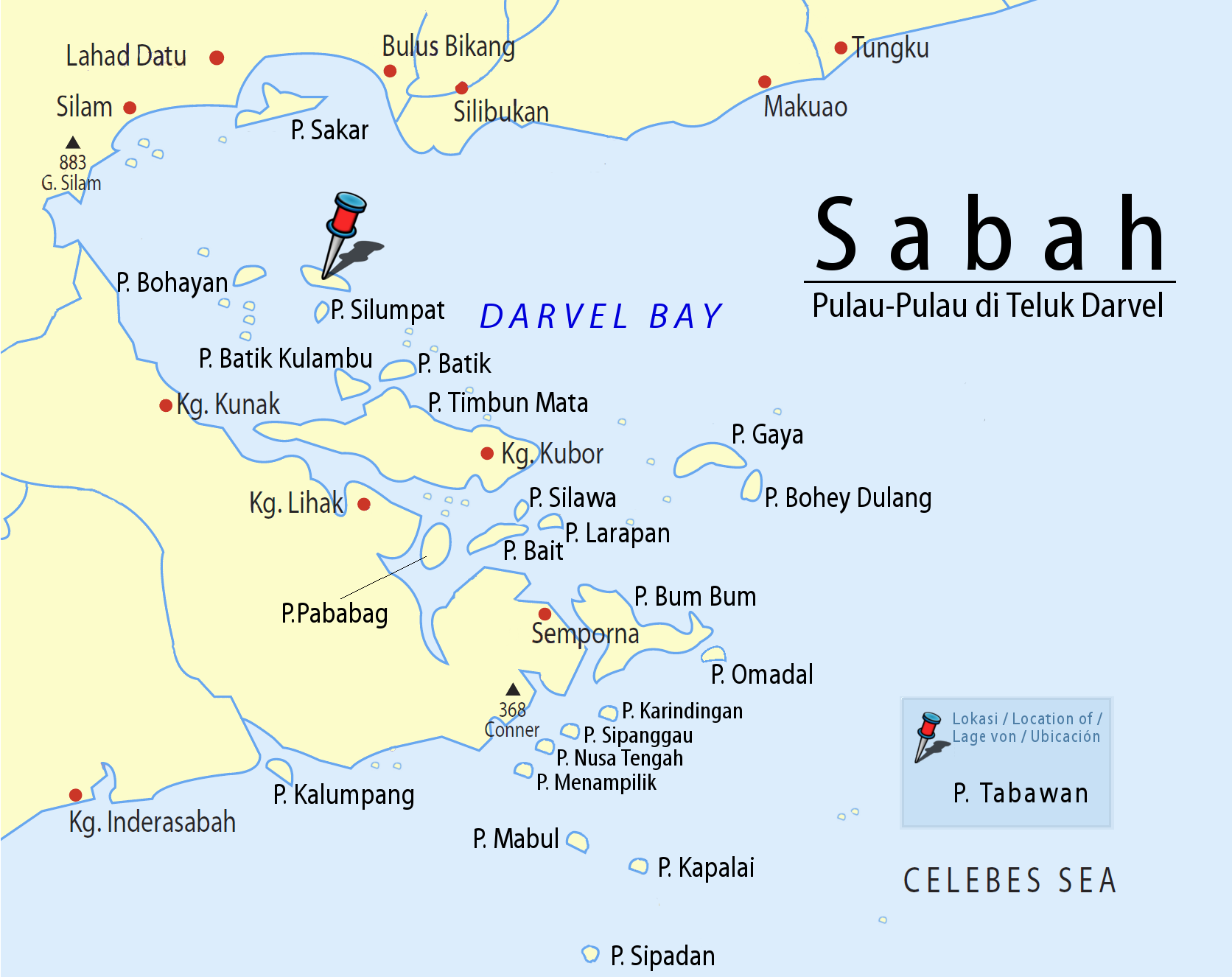
- Location of Tabawan Island in Darvel Bay
- Interactive map of Tabawan Island

Geography
- Coordinates: 4°48′0″N 118°23′0″E

Administration
- Malaysia
- State: Sabah
- Division: Tawau
- District: Lahad Datu

Tabawan Island or Tabauawan (Malay: Pulau Tabawan) is the highest and largest of a group of heavily wooded islands lying in the southwest quadrant of Darvel Bay (Teluk Lahad Datu), Sabah. It has dual volcanic peaks, and is 275 metres at its highest point. On the south side of the island there is a small bay, or inlet, quite deep, at 25 to 35 metres. It is about 7.25 kilometres from Sebatik Island, which lies to the southeast. For decades, the pearl farm of the island has safeguarded nearby waters to keep thieves and trespassers away.

Tabawan Island also called as Tabauwan Island, is situated in the southwest part of Darvel Bay. On the southern side of the island, there's a small deep bay that goes down to about 25 to 35 meters underwater. This island is the tallest and biggest among a bunch of islands covered in dense forests, and it has two tall volcanic peaks. The highest peak reaches up to 275 meters.

== See also ==
- List of islands of Malaysia
