= List of islands of Malaysia =

This is a list of islands of Malaysia. According to the Department of Survey and Mapping, Malaysia, there are 879 islands in the country. The state of Sabah has the most islands with 395 islands within its waters. In addition, Malaysia also has 510 offshore geographical features which include rocks, sandbanks and ridges. In 2015, it was reported that Malaysia still has over 535 unnamed islands, prompting the need for the government to take quick action to prevent neighbouring countries from taking over these islands. Most of the islands in the state of Sabah have been given a name, according to a statement from the State Land and Survey Department director.

== Major islands ==
=== Islands over 250,000 square kilometres ===
- Borneo (shared with Brunei and Indonesia)

=== Islands over 200 square kilometres ===
- Banggi, Sabah
- Bruit, Sarawak
- Langkawi, Kedah
- Penang, Penang
- Sebatik, Sabah (shared with North Kalimantan, Indonesia)

=== Disputed islands ===
- Spratly Islands (South China Sea Islands)

== Minor islands ==
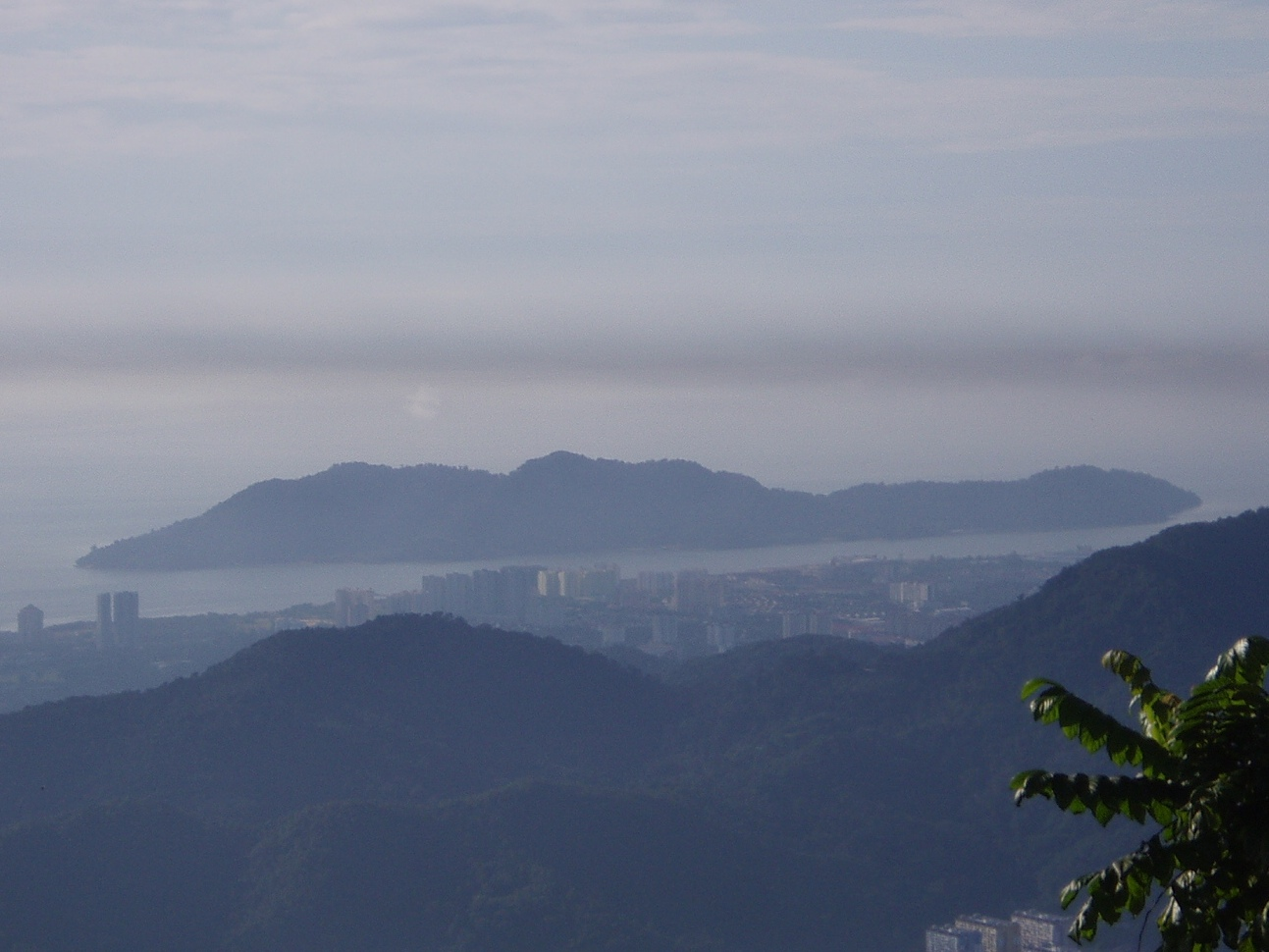
Jerejak Island.

Islands below 200 square kilometres

- Aman, Penang
- Aur, Johor
- Balambangan, Sabah
- Batik, Sabah
- Batu Layang, Perlis
- Beras Basah, Kedah
- Berhala, Sabah
- Besar, Malacca
- Besar, Johor
- Betong, Penang
- Bidan, Kedah
- Bidong, Terengganu
- Bodgaya, Sabah
- Bohayan, Sabah
- Boheydulang, Sabah
- Bunting, Kedah
- Bum Bum, Sabah
- Burong, Malacca
- Carey, Selangor
- Daat, Labuan
- Dinawan, Sabah
- Dayang, Johor
- Dayang Bunting, Kedah
- Dodol, Malacca
- Duyong, Terengganu
- Enoe, Sabah
- Gedung, Penang
- Gaya, Sabah
- Pulau Indah, Selangor
- Jambongan, Sabah
- Jerejak, Penang
- Kalumpang, Sabah
- Kapalai, Sabah
- Kapas, Terengganu
- Konet, Malacca
- Jarak, Perak
- Kalampunian Damit, Sabah
- Kendi, Penang
- Pulau Ketam, Selangor
- Klang, Selangor
- Kukup, Johor
- Kuraman, Labuan
- Labuan, Labuan
- Lalang, Malacca
- Langgun, Kedah
- Lang Tengah, Terengganu
- Lankayan, Sabah
- Layang Layang, Sabah
- Tuba, Kedah
- Libaran, Sabah
- Ligitan, Sabah
- Lumut, Perak
- Mabul, Sabah
- Malawali, Sabah
- Manukan, Sabah
- Mengalum, Sabah
- Mamutik, Sabah
- Manukan, Sabah
- Mantanani, Sabah
- Mataking, Sabah
- Montokud, Sabah
- Nangka, Malacca
- Pababag, Sabah
- Pangkor, Perak
- Panjang, Malacca
- Papan, Labuan
- Payar, Kedah
- Pemanggil, Johor
- Pisang, Johor
- Perak, Kedah
- Perhentian, Terengganu
- Pom Pom, Sabah
- Rawa, Johor
- Rebak Besar, Kedah
- Redang, Terengganu
- Rimau, Penang
- Rusa, Kelantan
- Sakar, Sabah
- Sapi, Sabah
- Sayak, Kedah
- Sebatik, Sabah
- Selingan, Sabah
- Sepanggar, Sabah
- Serimbun, Malacca
- Sibu, Johor
  - Big Simbu
  - Centre Sibu
  - Kukus Sibu
  - Hujung Sibu
  - Satang Sibu
  - Sempadi Sibu
  - Bawai sibu
  - Talang-Talang sibu
- Singa Besar, Kedah
- Sipadan, Sabah
- Songsong, Kedah
- Sulug, Sabah
- Tabawan, Sabah
- Tanjung Dendang, Kedah
- Telor, Kedah
- Tengah, Johor
- Tenggol, Terengganu
- Tiga, Sabah
- Tigabu, Sabah
- Tikus, Penang
- Timbun Mata, Sabah
- Timun, Kedah
- Tinggi, Johor
- Tioman, Pahang
- Tukun, Perak
- Upeh, Malacca
- Undan, Malacca
- Wan Man, Terengganu

== Artificial islands ==
- Andaman, Penang
- Gazumbo, Penang
- Silicon, Penang
- Forest City, Johor
- Malacca, Malacca
- Tanjung Embang, Sarawak
- Marina, Perak

== Other island groups, conservation areas, and national parks ==
- Tunku Abdul Rahman National Park, Sabah
- Tun Sakaran Marine Park, Sabah
- Sugud Islands Marine Conservation Area, Sabah
- Turtle Islands National Park, Sabah
- Tanjung Datu National Park, Sarawak
- Talang Satang National Park, Sarawak

== See also ==
- List of islands
