= Sepanggar Island =

Island in Malaysia

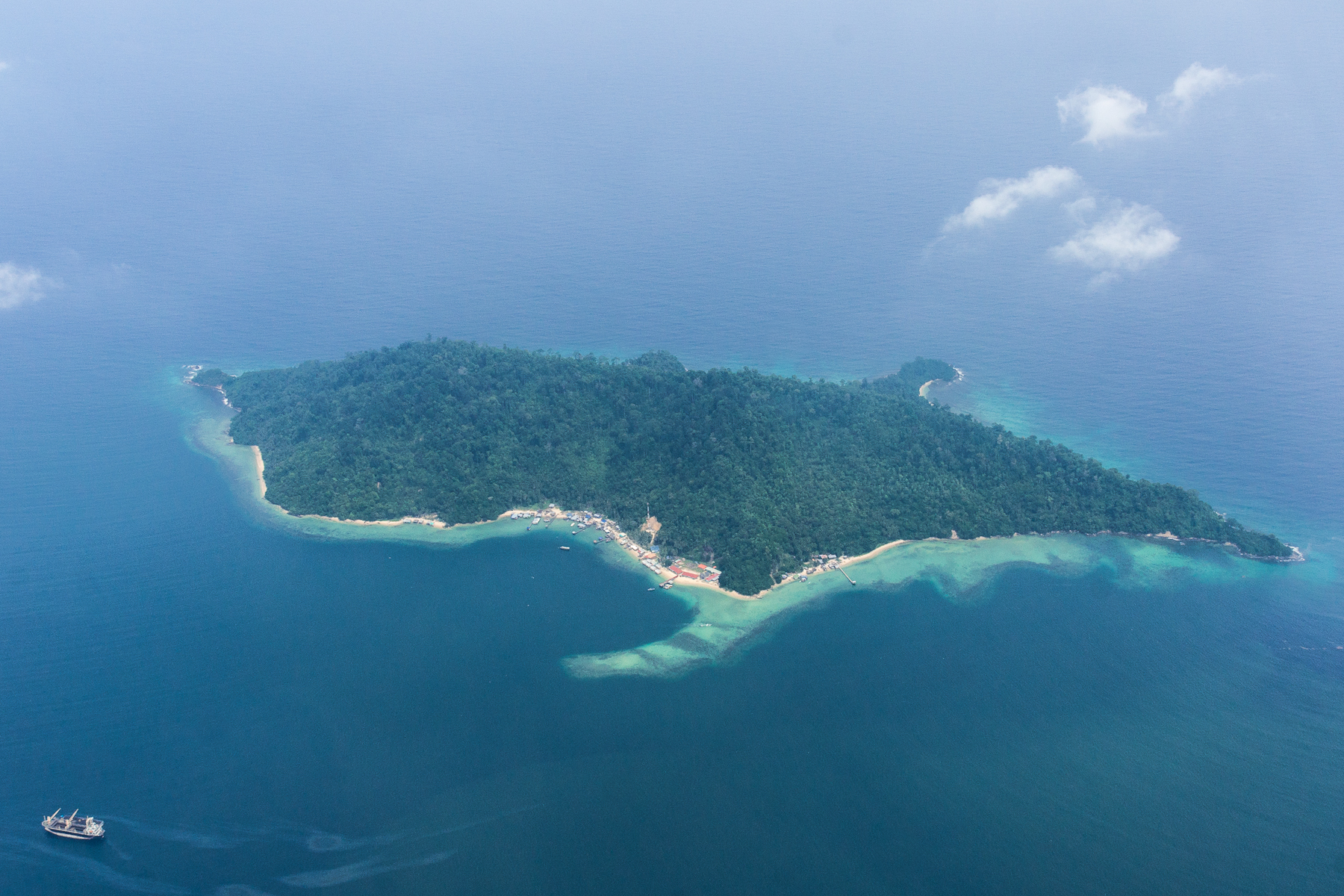
- Aerial view of Sepanggar Island
- Interactive map of Sepanggar Island

Geography
- Coordinates: 6°4′4″N 116°4′26″E

Administration
- Malaysia
- State: Sabah
- Division: West Coast
- District: Kota Kinabalu

Sepanggar Island (Malay: Pulau Sepanggar) is an island located off Sepanggar, Sabah. Its eastern shore supports a small community. The island is easily spotted from the city centre and from Likas Bay. It has a northeast–southwest orientation and therefore commands a view of Gaya Bay on the eastern shoreline. The island has two main peaks and is covered in thick tropical rainforest. This island can be accessed by the jetty near the city centre or from Sepanggar Bay, near the navy base. This island, however, is not really visited by tourists but mostly fishermen stay there. This island is known to be where several World War II bombs have been found.

== See also ==
- List of islands of Malaysia
