= Besar Island, Malacca =

Island in Malacca, Malaysia

Besar Island
Native name: Pulau Besar (Rumi) ڤولاو بسر (Jawi)
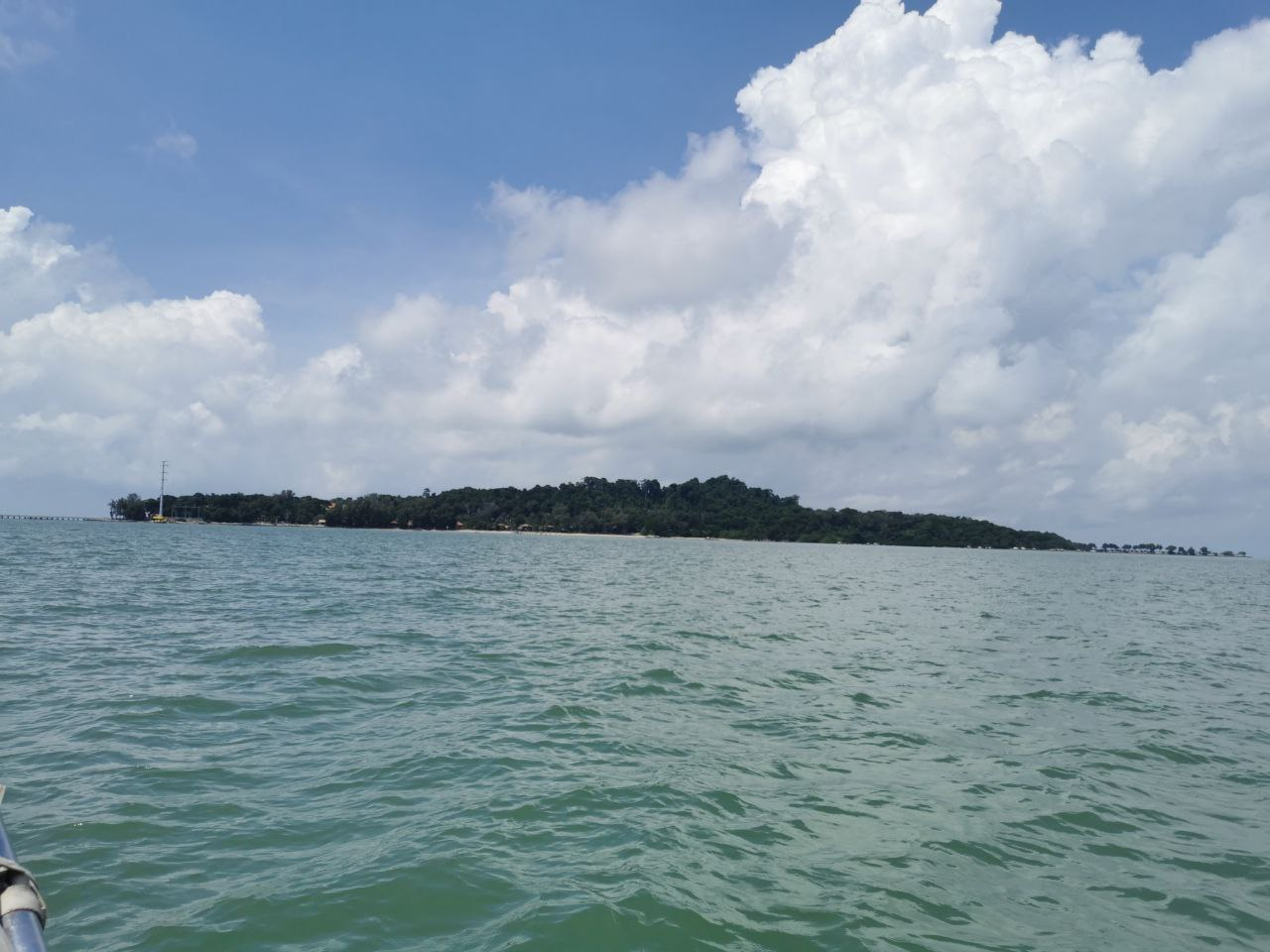
- Besar Island seen from Umbai
- Interactive map of Besar Island

Geography
- Location: Strait of Malacca
- Coordinates: 2°6′30.8″N 102°19′37.83″E
- Archipelago: Water Islands
- Area: 1.34 km^{2} (0.52 sq mi)

Administration
- Malaysia
- State: Malacca
- District: Melaka Tengah
- Mukim: Pernu

Additional information
- Time zone: MST (UTC+8)
- Postal code: 75460

Besar Island (translated as Big Island, Malay: Pulau Besar, in Jawi Script: ڤولاو بسر) is an island approximately 13 km off the coast of mainland Malacca in Malaysia. It is served by 15-minute private motorboat rides from the towns of Pernu and Umbai and 30-minute scheduled ferry rides from Anjung Batu Jetty in Umbai.

== Tourist attractions ==
There are a few attractions which spread across the island, including the tombs of Baghdad-born Islamic preacher Sultan Al Ariffin Syeikh Ismail and his relatives, who were part of an entourage responsible for the spread of Islam throughout the Malay Archipelago after arriving at the island in 1495.

There are also tombs of local figures, unmarked graves and numerous mystical and legendary old wells and rock formations. According to local legends, one of the wells is believed to contain salt water at high tide and fresh water during low tide. The island is believed to be the home of elves known as Orang bunian and there is a cave known as Yunos Cave (Malay: Gua Yunos), where warriors were said to practice mysticism and learn silat (a type of Malay martial arts) in the past.

The Besar Island Museum (Malay: Muzium Pulau Besar), operated by the state's Museum Corporation displays various information related to the island's sights and legend.

== Facilities ==
There is one religious school located on the northeastern tip of the island, adjacent to the jetty. Two resorts Putera Island Resort on the east side of the island and Marina Resort on the West are currently abandoned and no longer in operation today.

A 4.2-kilometre long sea-crossing overhead power line supported by 12 monopoles, which began operations on 28 February 2015, was built to supply electricity to the island from nearby Siring Beach in Serkam, Jasin District.

== Gallery ==
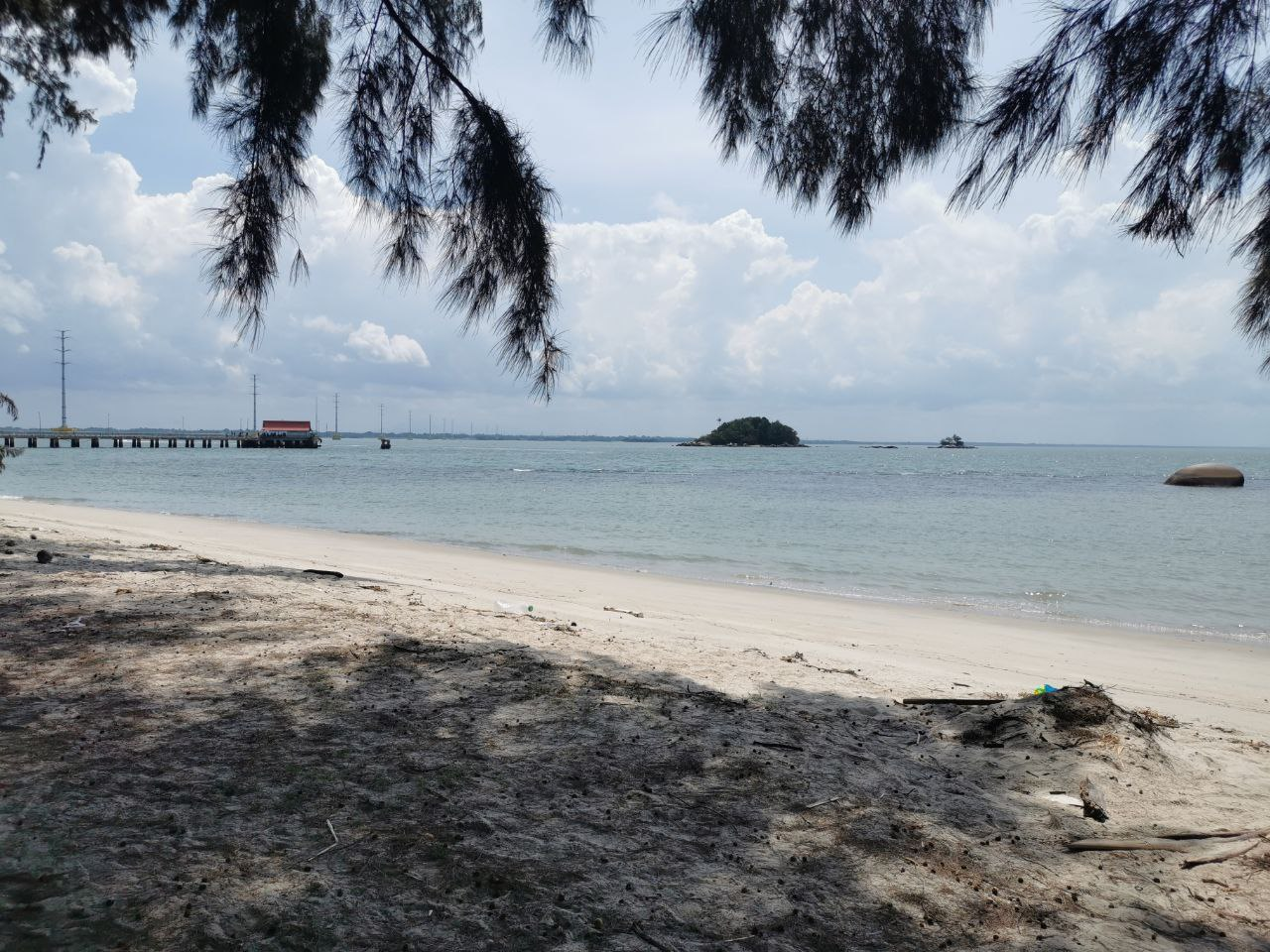
White sandy beach in Besar Island near the jetty, overlooking Lalang Island.

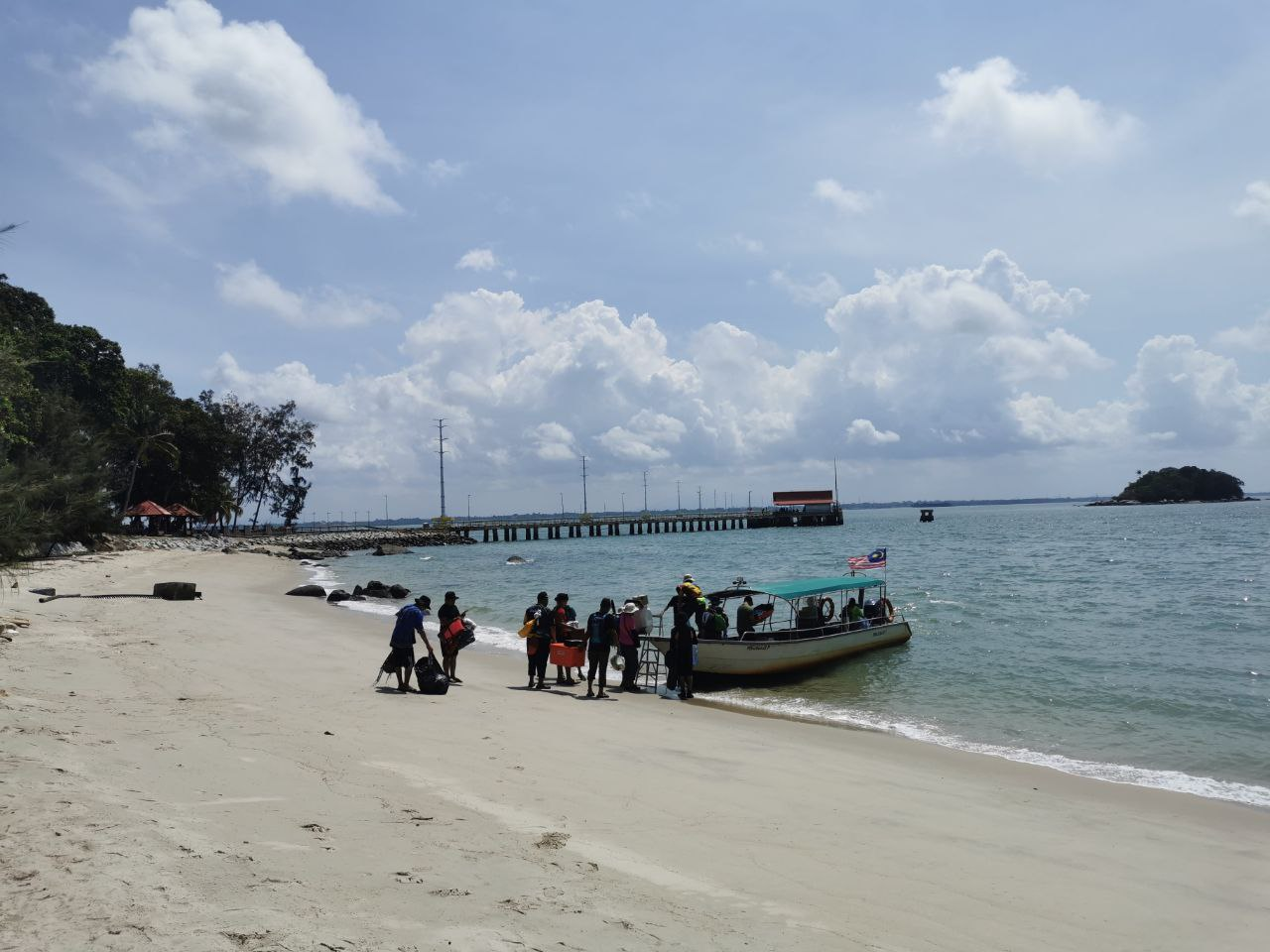
Shuttle boat to Besar Island

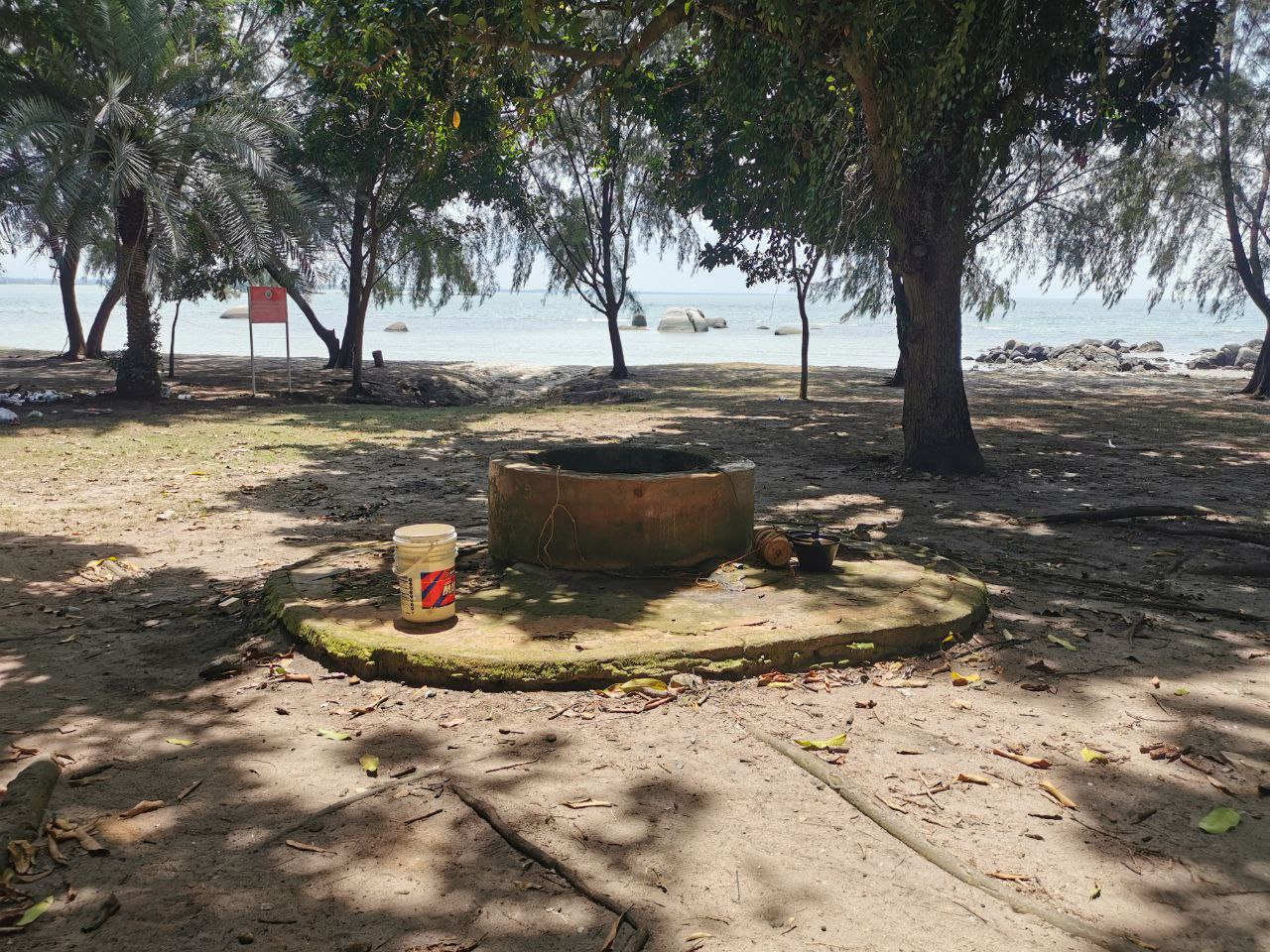
Freshwater well in Besar Island

== Water Islands ==
Besar Island along with 6 nearby islets form the Water Islands Group (Malay: Gugusan Pulau Besar). Three of these: Nangka, Dodol and Undan Island were made part of the Malacca Marine Park on the 4th of April 2023 by the Malaysian Department of Fisheries.

Island	Area (km^{2})
Besar	1.344
Nangka	0.117
Dodol	0.060
Undan	0.048
Serimbun	0.033
Hanyut	0.015
Lalang	0.010
Total	1.627

== See also ==
- List of islands of Malaysia
