= Undan Island =

Group of two uninhabited islets off the coast of Malacca in Malaysia

Native name: Pulau Undan

Geography
- Location: Strait of Malacca
- Coordinates: 2°02′53″N 102°20′02″E
- Archipelago: Water Islands
- Area: 0.046 km^{2} (0.018 sq mi)

Administration
- Malaysia
- State: Malacca
- District: Melaka Tengah
- Mukim: Pernu

Undan Island (translated as Pelican Island, Malay: Pulau Undan) is a group of two uninhabited islets located 25 kilometres (16 mi) off the coast of Malacca in Malaysia. The larger islet houses a lighthouse built in 1880 by the British and a communication tower made of concrete, both forbidden to the public. It is connected to the smaller islet, which is accessible by foot during low tide, by a tombolo. The islet is surrounded by a variety of corals, rocks and sandy beaches and is solely reachable by boat. People mainly visit there for activities like camping, fishing, hiking, scuba diving, snorkeling and swimming.

On 4 April 2023, Undan Island alongside nearby Nangka and Dodol Islands are gazetted as a national marine park.

== See also ==
- List of islands of Malaysia
- Undan Island Lighthouse
- Besar Island, Malacca
- Betong Island
