= Jarak Island bent-toed gecko =

Scientific classification
- Kingdom: Animalia
- Phylum: Chordata
- Class: Reptilia
- Order: Squamata
- Suborder: Gekkota
- Family: Gekkonidae
- Genus: Cyrtodactylus
- Species: C. jarakensis

Binomial name
- Cyrtodactylus jarakensis Grismer, Chan, Grismer, Wood & Belabut, 2008

Species of lizard

The Jarak Island bent-toed gecko (Cyrtodactylus jarakensis) is a species of gecko that is endemic to Jarak Island in Malaysia. The gecko can commonly be found at night on the island, but has been noted as being exceptionally difficult to approach.
