= Tukun Perak Island =

Island in Malaysia

Pulau Tukun Perak

Geography
- Location: Strait of Malacca
- Coordinates: 4°07′36″N 100°33′38″E
- Area: 0.0044 km^{2} (0.0017 sq mi)

Administration
- Malaysia
- State: Perak
- District: Manjung
- Mukim: Lumut

Tukun Perak Island is an island in Manjung District, Perak, Malaysia south of Pangkor Island. Tukun Perak Island is also known as Fairway Rock or Fairway White Rock. There are several boat rental operators that provide fishing trip to Tukun Perak Island.

Common fish caught by anglers sought are Giant Trevally, Blue Fin Tuna, Yellow Fin Tuna, Rainbow Runner, Sail Fish, Marlin, Dorado, Coral Trout, Red Snaper, Giant Grouper and others.

== See also ==
- List of islands of Malaysia
