= Gazumbo Island =

Artificial island in Penang, Malaysia

Native name: Pulau Gazumbo
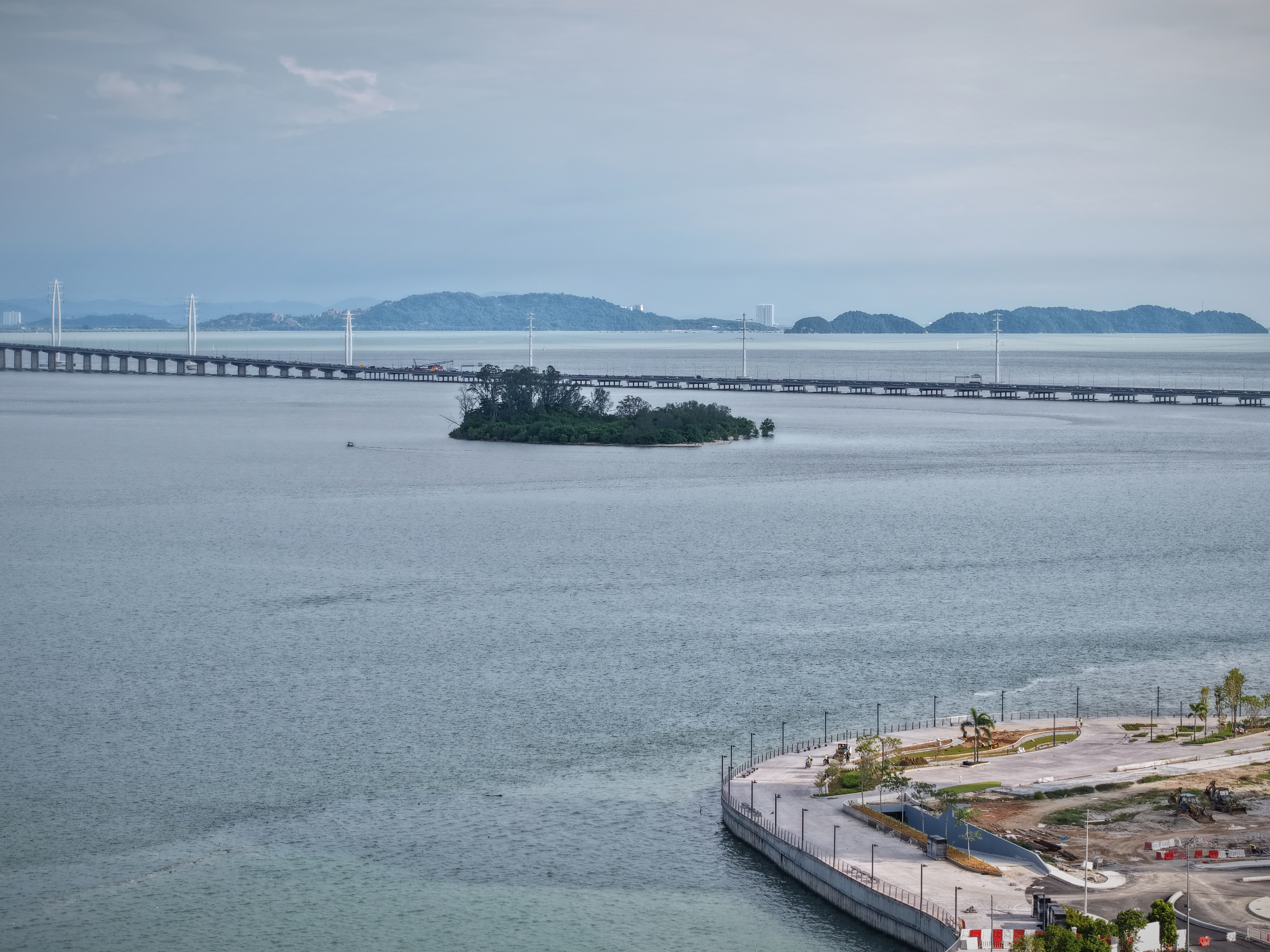

Geography
- Location: Penang Strait
- Coordinates: 5°21′50″N 100°19′34″E

Administration
- Malaysia
- State: Penang
- City: George Town
- District: Northeast
- Mukim: Paya Terubong

Gazumbo Island is a tidal islet off the eastern coast of Penang Island in the Malaysian state of Penang. It is situated at the Penang Strait, north of the Penang Bridge and east of The Light Waterfront township.

== Description ==
View of the Penang Strait, Penang Bridge, and Gazumbo Island from The Light Waterfront

Gazumbo Island was formed in the 1980s during the construction of the bridge, which caused dredged materials to accumulate and create two islets. The larger of these islets is known as Gazumbo Island, after a fictional island featured in a 1954 film starring P. Ramlee, although it is also referred to as Udini Island and Kazambo Island. The smaller islet, called Pulau Pasir Timbul (Floating Sand Island), has been submerged since 2017.

Gazumbo Island features a topography characterised by beaches and mudflats, with a low-lying depression at its centre that fills during high tide. The islet supports a diverse ecosystem, including various species of seagrass, mangroves, and terrestrial plants such as casuarina, wild jasmine and sea almond. It is also frequented by dolphins and sea turtles. To safeguard the surrounding ecosystem, the Penang state government has proposed designating approximately 10 km^{2} (3.9 sq mi) of the Penang Strait as a marine protected area. However, as of 2024, this proposal was put on hold pending development associated with the nearby Jelutong landfill.

== See also ==
- List of islands of Malaysia
