= Kukup Island =

Island in Pontian District, Johor, Malaysia

Native name: Pulau Kukup
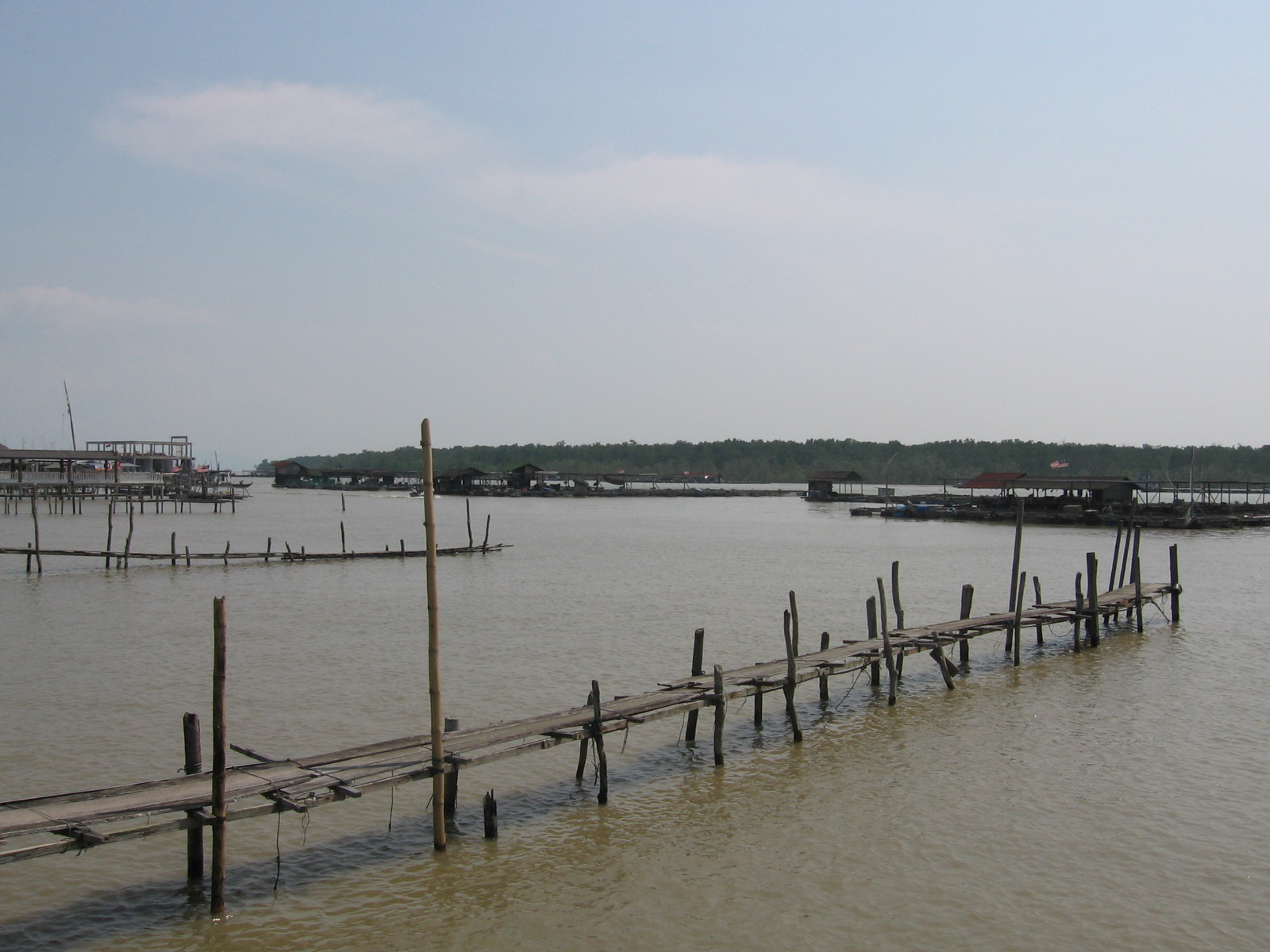
- Interactive map of Kukup Island

Geography
- Location: Strait of Malacca
- Coordinates: 1°19′16″N 103°25′38″E
- Area: 4.88 km^{2} (1.88 sq mi)

Administration
- Malaysia
- State: Johor
- District: Pontian
- Mukim: Ayer Masin

Designations

Ramsar Wetland
- Official name: Pulau Kukup
- Designated: 31 January 2003
- Reference no.: 1287

Kukup Island (Malay: Pulau Kukup) is an island in Pontian District, Johor, Malaysia.

== Geology ==
The island is predominantly covered by mangrove and mudflat. It is surrounded by 8 km^{2} of mudflat. Recently (2018) it was rumored that the island holds large deposits of gold.

== Geography ==
The island is located around 1 km offshore from Johor mainland. The island spans over an area of 4.88 km^{2}.

== Ecology ==
The island consists of various wildlife animals, such as monkeys, wild boars, mudskippers etc.

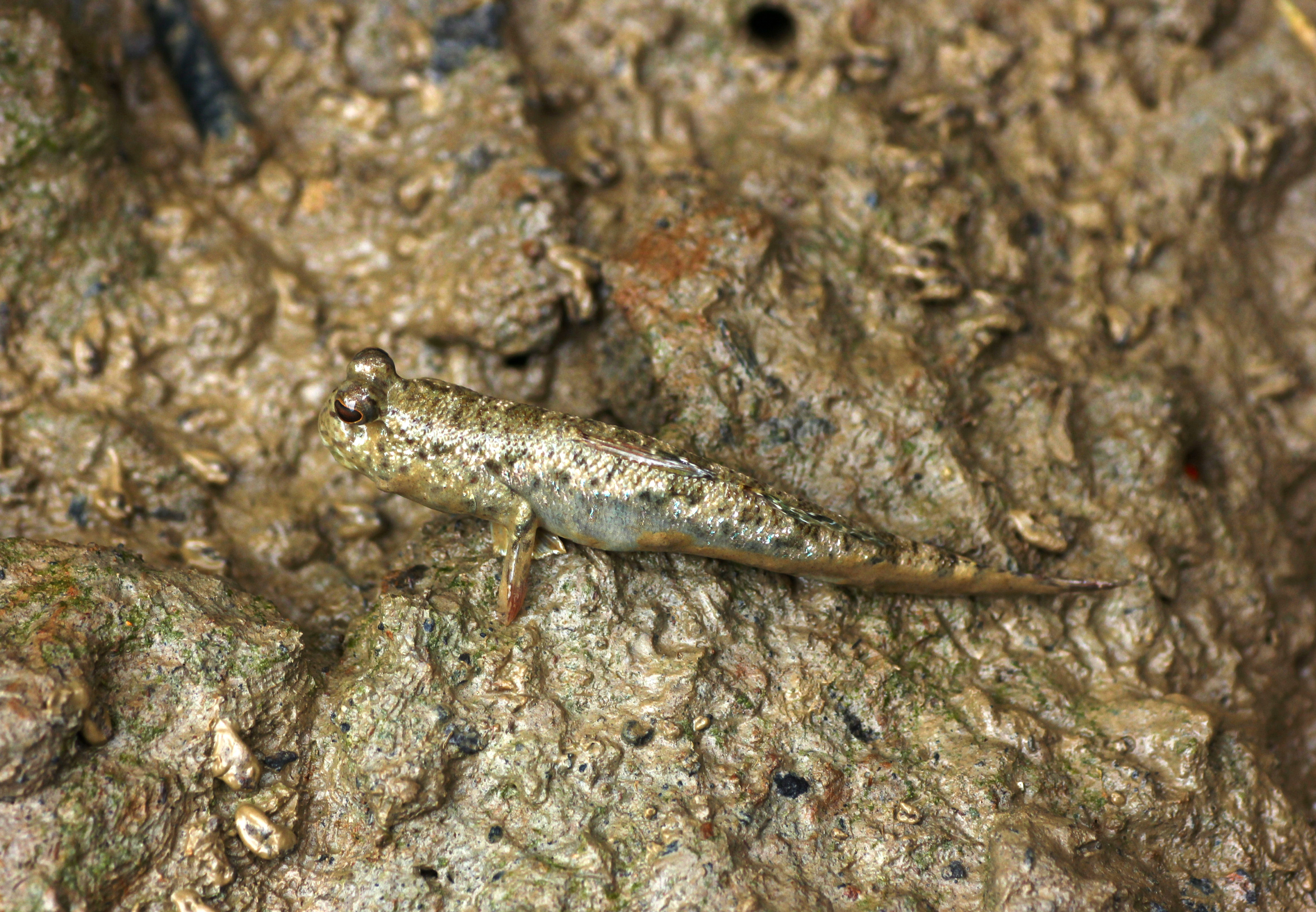
Amphibious fish

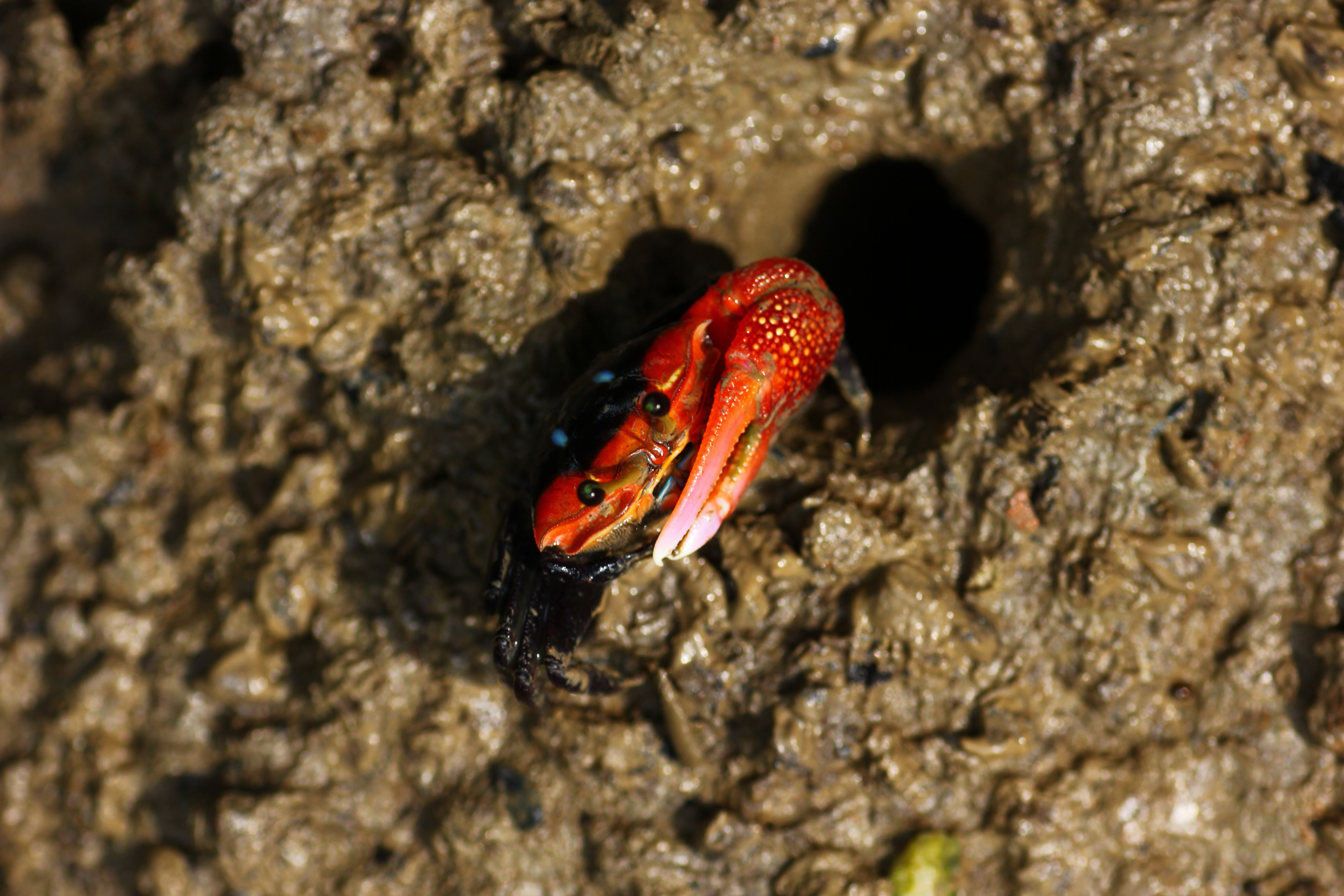
Fidler crab

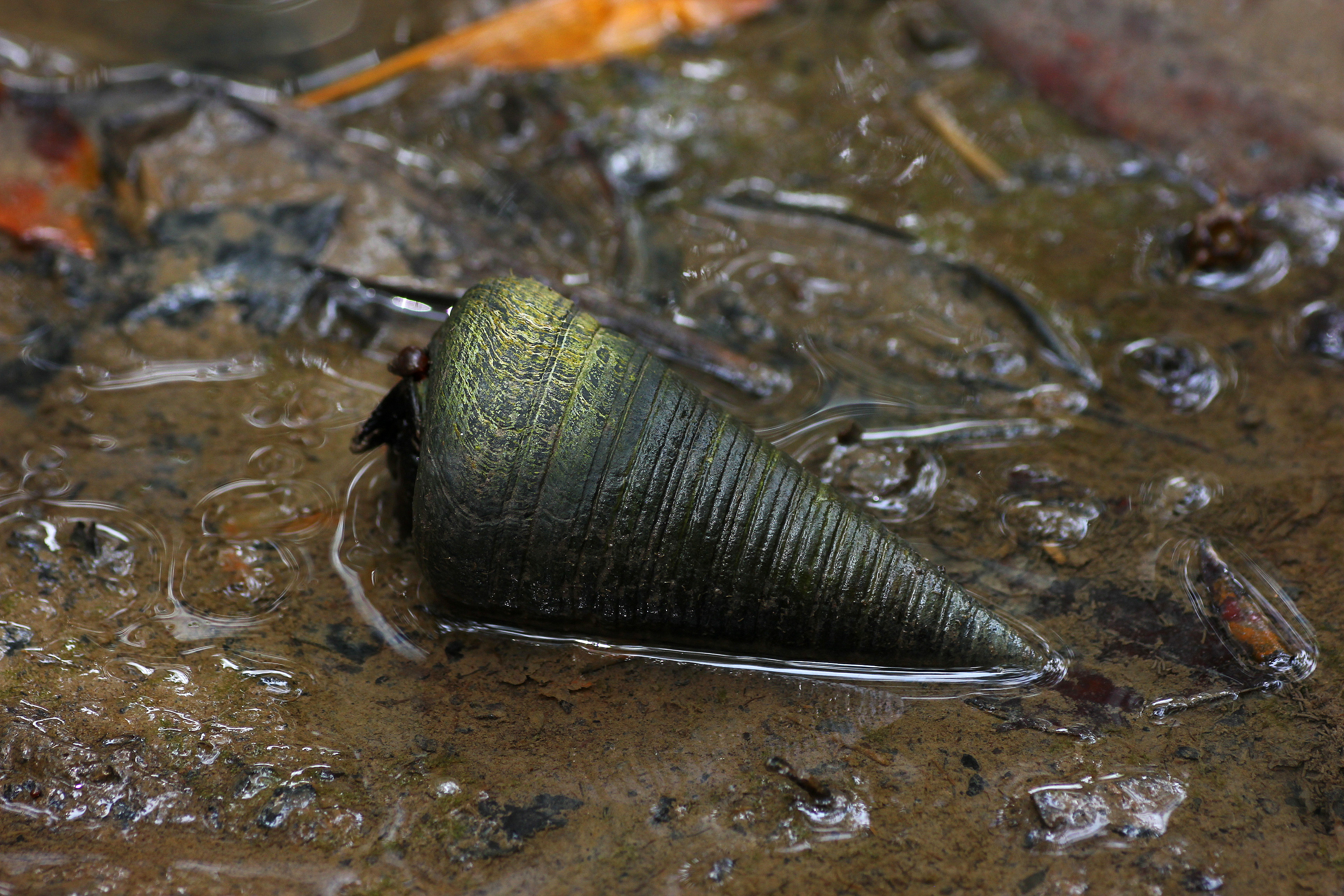
Telescopium telescopium

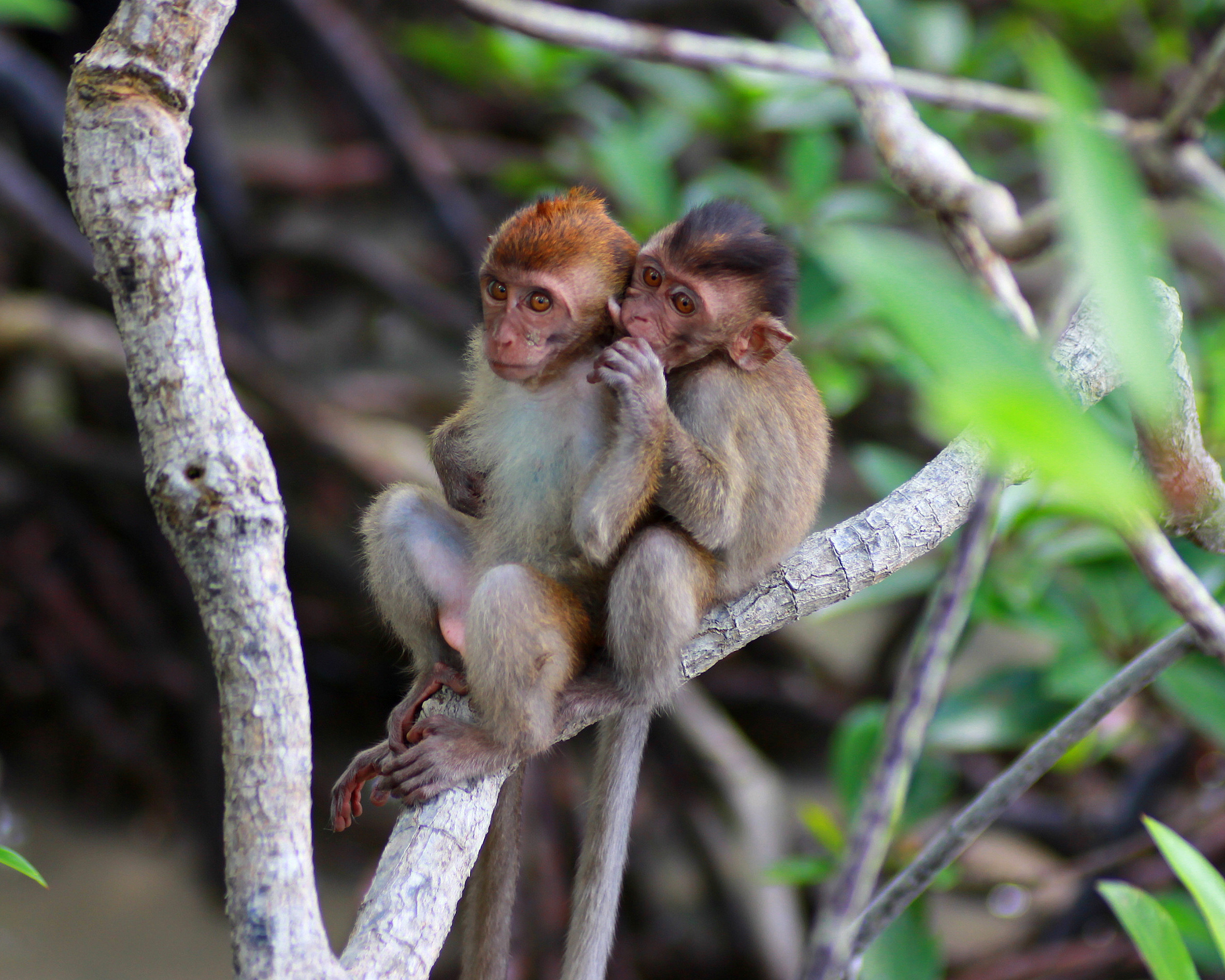
Monkeys

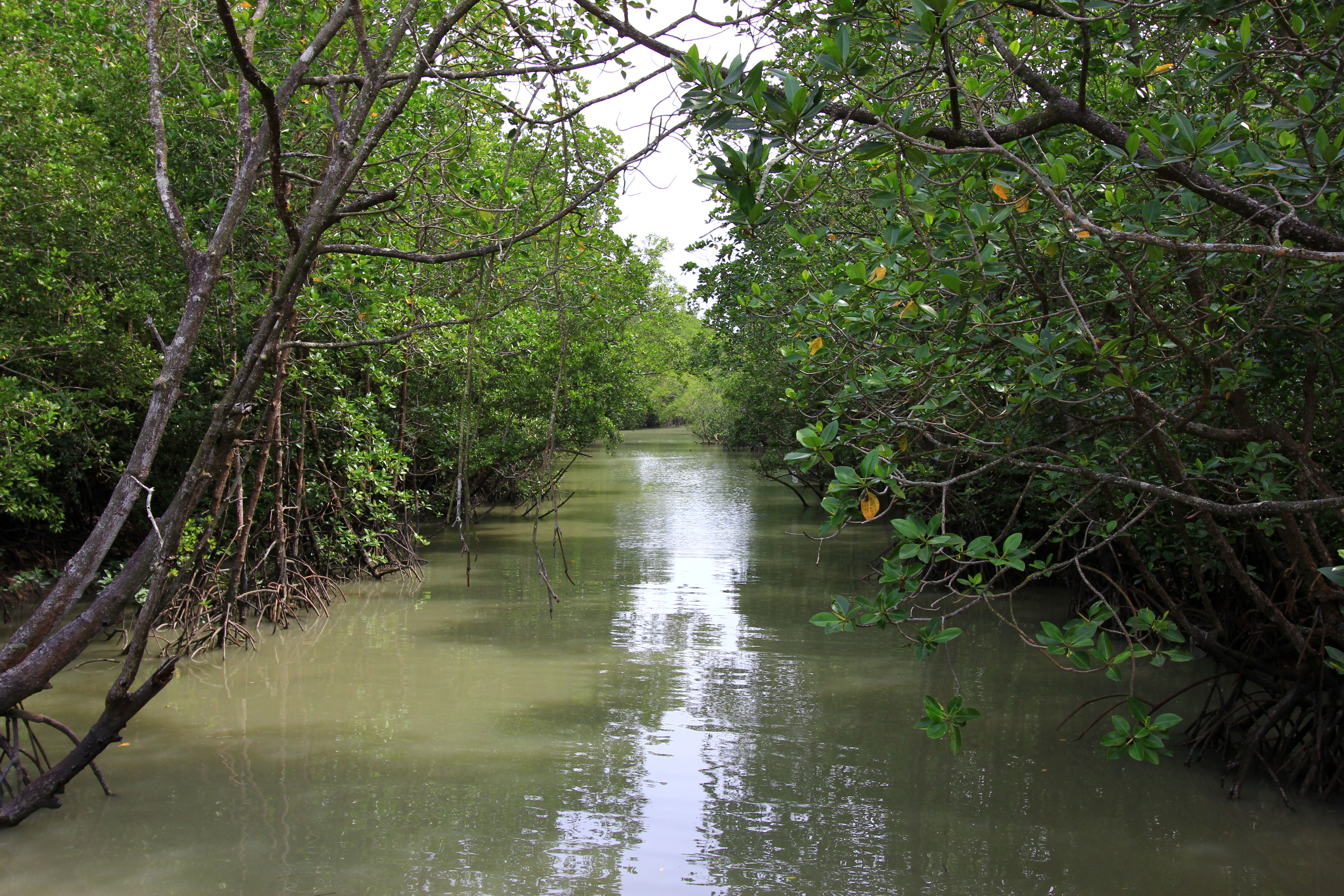
Mangrove forest

== History ==
Kukup Island status as a remote hinterland changed in the 1990s when scientists began focusing on the island's biodiversity a unique ecological characteristics. In the interest of preserving this unique habitat, Kukup Island was gazetted a national park on 27 March 1997 under the Johor State Park Corporation Enactment 1989. On 31 January 2003, this island was granted the status of a "Wetland of International Importance", or Ramsar site, by the Geneva-based Ramsar Convention Bureau.

== See also ==
- List of islands of Malaysia
- List of Ramsar wetlands of international importance
