= Bodgaya Island =

Island in Sabah, Malaysia

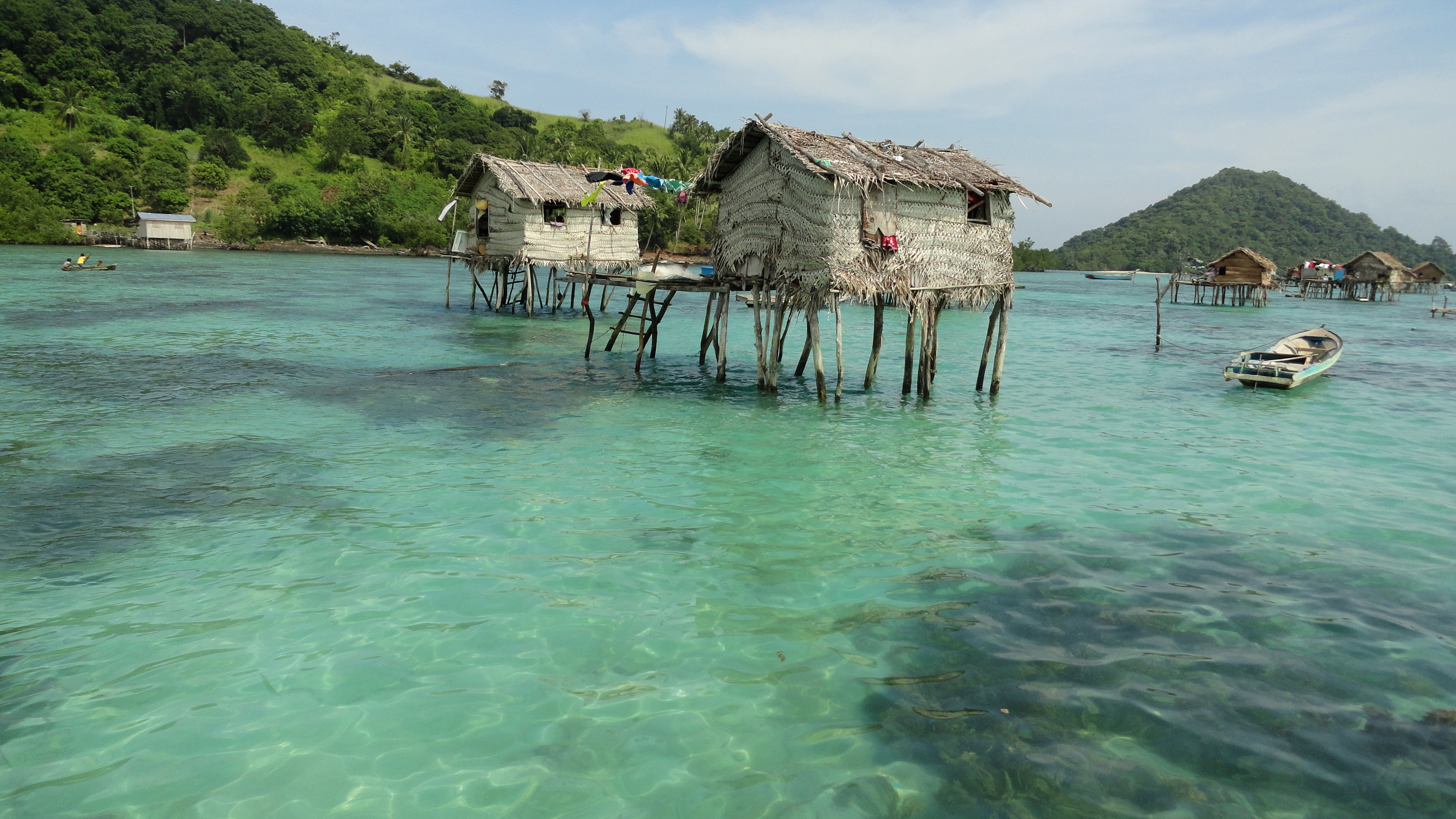
- Interactive map of Bodgaya Island

Geography
- Coordinates: 4°37′35.1″N 118°45′28.2″E

Administration
- Malaysia
- State: Sabah
- Division: Tawau
- District: Semporna

Bodgaya Island (Malay: Pulau Bodgaya) is located off the east coast of Sabah, Malaysia. It is the largest island in and forms part of the Tun Sakaran Marine Park just off the town of Semporna. The island has an area of 7.96 km^{2}. Bodgaya, together with Boheydulang Island and the surrounding reefs, are remnants of an extinct volcano.

== See also ==
- List of islands of Malaysia
- List of volcanoes in Malaysia
