= Undan Island Lighthouse =

Lighthouse in Melaka, Malaysia

Undan Island Lighthouse Rumah Api Pulau Undan
- Location: Undan Island, Malacca, Malaysia
- Coordinates: 2°02′53″N 102°20′02″E

Tower
- Constructed: 1880
- Construction: masonry
- Height: 15 m (49 ft)
- Shape: octagon
- Markings: red

Light
- Focal height: 53 m (174 ft)
- Range: 18 nmi (33 km; 21 mi)
- Characteristic: Fl(2) W 15s

Undan Island Lighthouse is a lighthouse on the summit of the uninhabited islet of Undan Island, located 25 kilometres (16 mi) off the coast of mainland Malacca in Malaysia.

The lighthouse was engineered and constructed by the Chance Brothers and Company from Birmingham in 1879 and completed in 1880, as a beacon for ships travelling along the Strait of Malacca. It is octagonal and cylindrical in shape, housing the lantern and a gallery and is adjoined to a single storey keeper's house; both structures were constructed of masonry.

A more recent concrete communications tower, roughly three times the height of the original lighthouse, is cylindrical and stark in design, and situated directly beside the lighthouse.

== See also ==
- List of lighthouses in Malaysia
- Cape Rachado Lighthouse
- Undan Island
