= Jarak Island =

Island in the straits of Malacca

Native name: Pulau Jarak / ڤولاو جارق
- Interactive map of Jarak Island

Geography
- Location: Straits of Malacca
- Coordinates: 3°58′40″N 100°05′58″E
- Area: 0.39 km^{2} (0.15 sq mi)

Administration
- Malaysia
- State: Perak
- District: Manjung
- Mukim: Lumut

Jarak Island (Malay: Pulau Jarak / ڤولاو جارق) is an island in the straits of Malacca. It is administered as part of Perak, Malaysia. The island is granitic, heavily forested, and has a rocky shoreline. Jarak has been described as being 8 hectares (20 acres) in size.

The island is home to an endemic species of gecko, the Jarak Island bent-toed gecko (Cyrtodactylus jarakensis). The waters around the island host a number of coral reefs.

A notable, extensive survey of the island was documented by John Wyatt-Smith and Michael Tweedie in 1950, who were part of an expedition investigating scrub typhus on the island.
