= Mataking Island =

Island in Malaysia

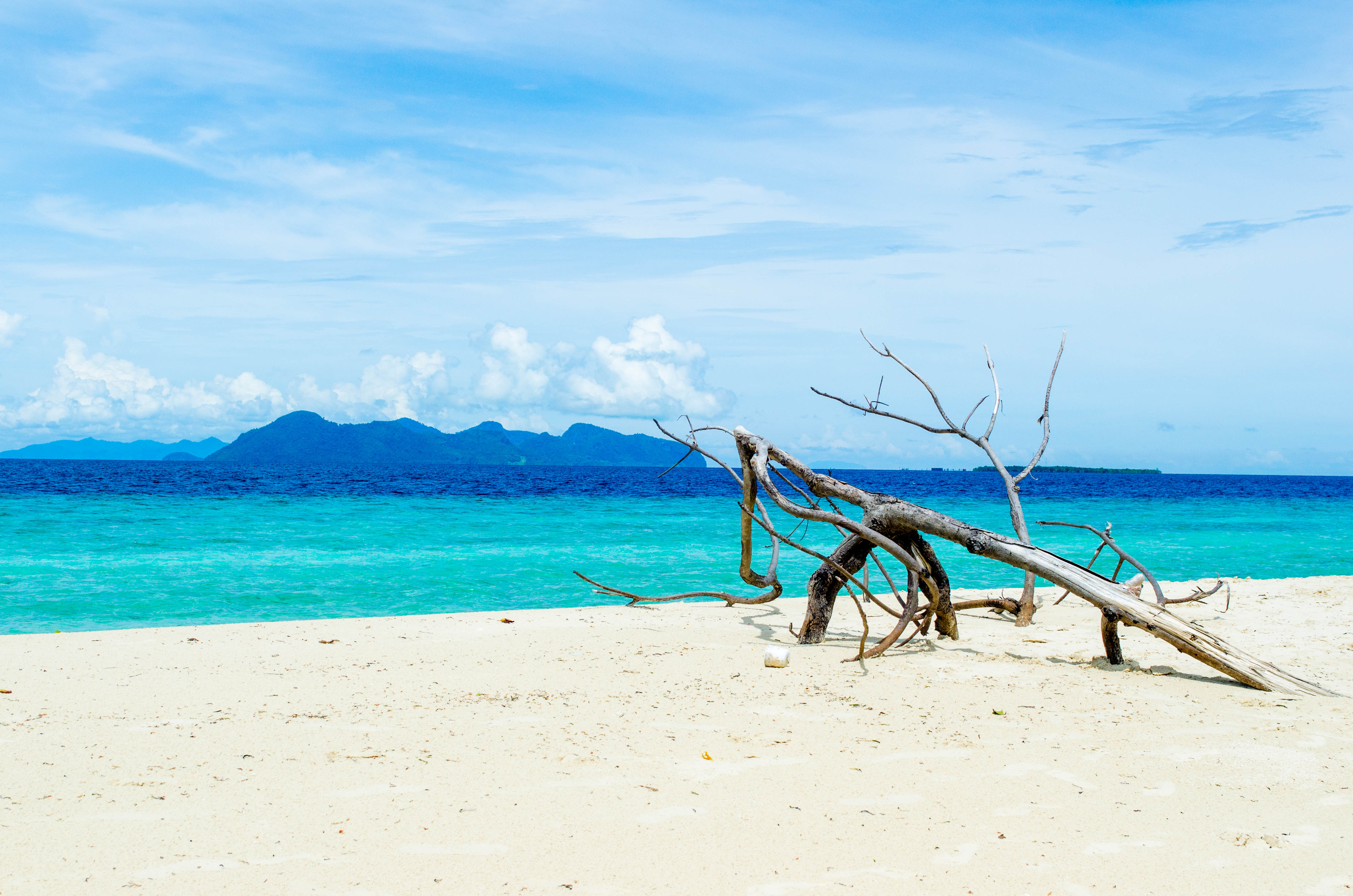
- View from Mataking Island
- Interactive map of Mataking Island

Geography
- Coordinates: 4°34′34″N 118°56′56″E

Administration
- Malaysia
- State: Sabah
- Division: Tawau
- District: Semporna

Mataking Island (Malay: Pulau Mataking) is a Malaysian island located in the Celebes Sea on the state of Sabah. Mataking Island is home to the first 'Underwater Post Office' in Malaysia and is connected to Pulau Mataking Kecil (Small Mataking Island) via a narrow sand bank. Mataking Island is a private island belonging to the Reef Dive Resort featuring luxury chalets and a dive center serving divers visiting Sipadan.

== See also ==
- List of islands of Malaysia
