= Timbun Mata =

Island in Malaysia

Timbun Mata Island
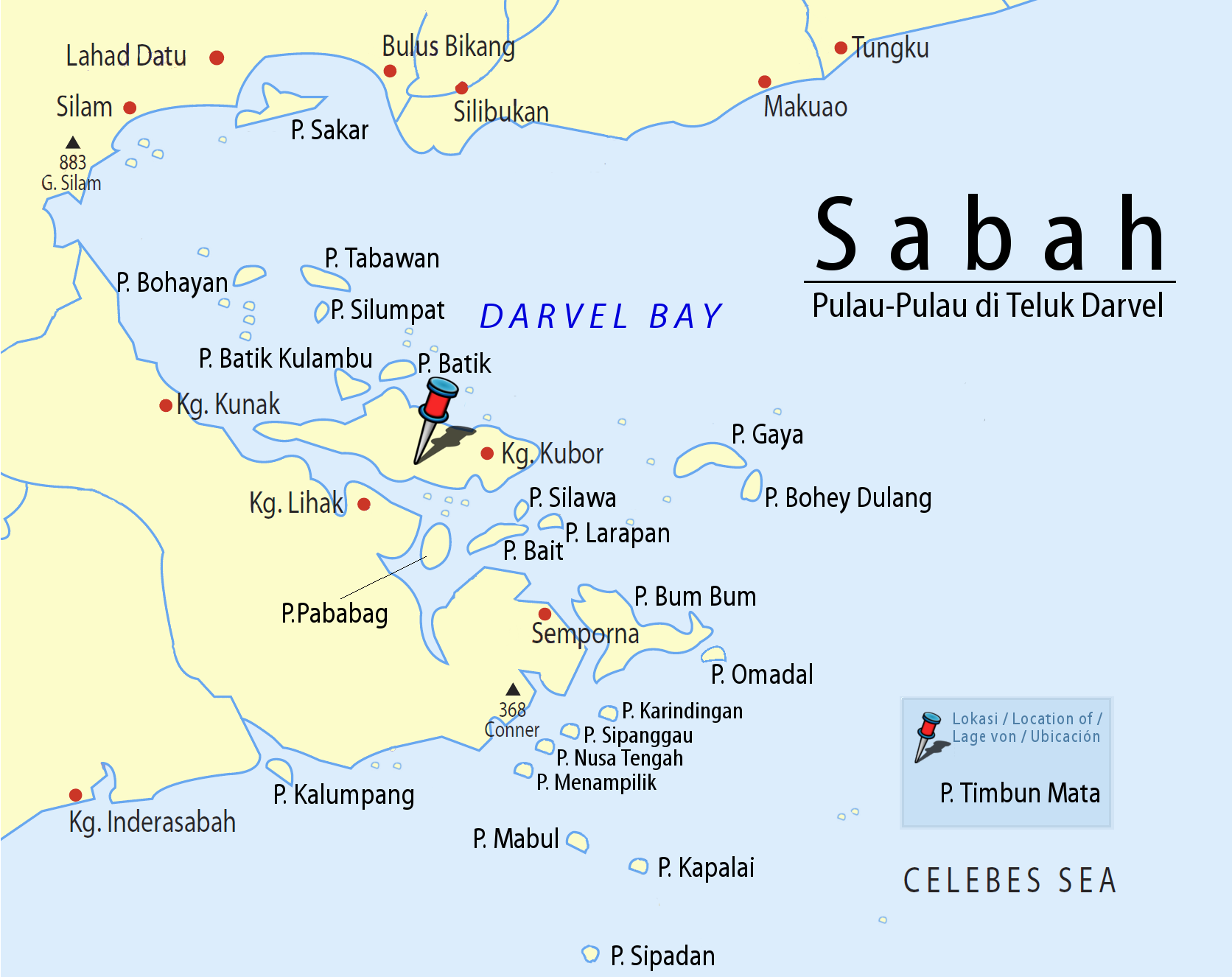
- Location of Timbun Mata Island in Darvel Bay
- Interactive map of Timbun Mata Island

Geography
- Location: Darvel Bay
- Coordinates: 4°38′25″N 118°28′29″E
- Archipelago: Borneo
- Adjacent to: Celebes Sea
- Area: 130.7 km^{2} (50.5 sq mi)
- Length: 26 km (16.2 mi)
- Width: 10 km (6 mi)
- Coastline: 79.9 km (49.65 mi)
- Highest elevation: 620 m (2030 ft)
- Highest point: Mount Tannabalu

Administration
- Malaysia
- State: Sabah
- Division: Tawau
- District: Semporna

Timbun Mata Island (Malay: Pulau Timbun Mata) is the largest island on the south side of Darvel Bay, in Semporna, Sabah, Malaysia. It is over 26 kilometres (16 mi) long and almost 10 kilometres (6.2 mi) wide at the widest point, and is also mountainous and was formerly (pre-2000) densely wooded. Mt. Tannabalu, the highest point at 620 metres (2,030 ft), is a conical, extinct volcano located at the centre of the island. A secondary peak, Mt. Sedungal, at the east end of the island rises to 489 metres (1,604 ft). The south side of the island is only separated from the mainland by a shallow channel known as the Trusan Sigalong. It is located at 4°38′25″N 118°28′29″E with an area of 114.97 square kilometres (44.39 sq mi).

== History ==
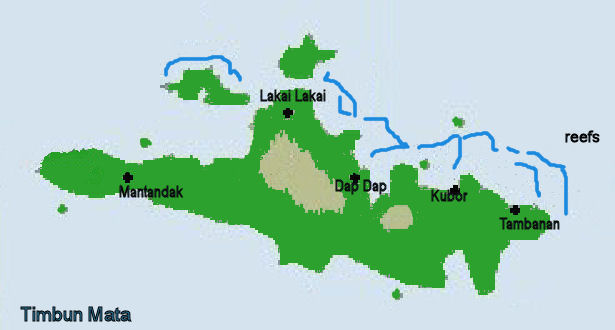
Map of Timbun Mata Island.

The island has been inhabited since before records were kept. There are several villages on the island which have been there for at least several hundred years, Mantandak (in the west), Lakai Lakai (north), Dap Dap (northeast) and Kubor (east). In addition there are newer, illegal settlements which have sprung up on the southeastern portion of the island.

The island was declared a forest reserve in 1930, but had been planted in teak as early as the 1880s. The teak forests have been periodically surveyed, but inroads by illegal logging and land clearing have reduced them.

== See also ==
- List of islands of Malaysia
