= Tun Sakaran Marine Park =

Marine park off the east coast of Sabah, Malaysia

- IUCN category II (national park)
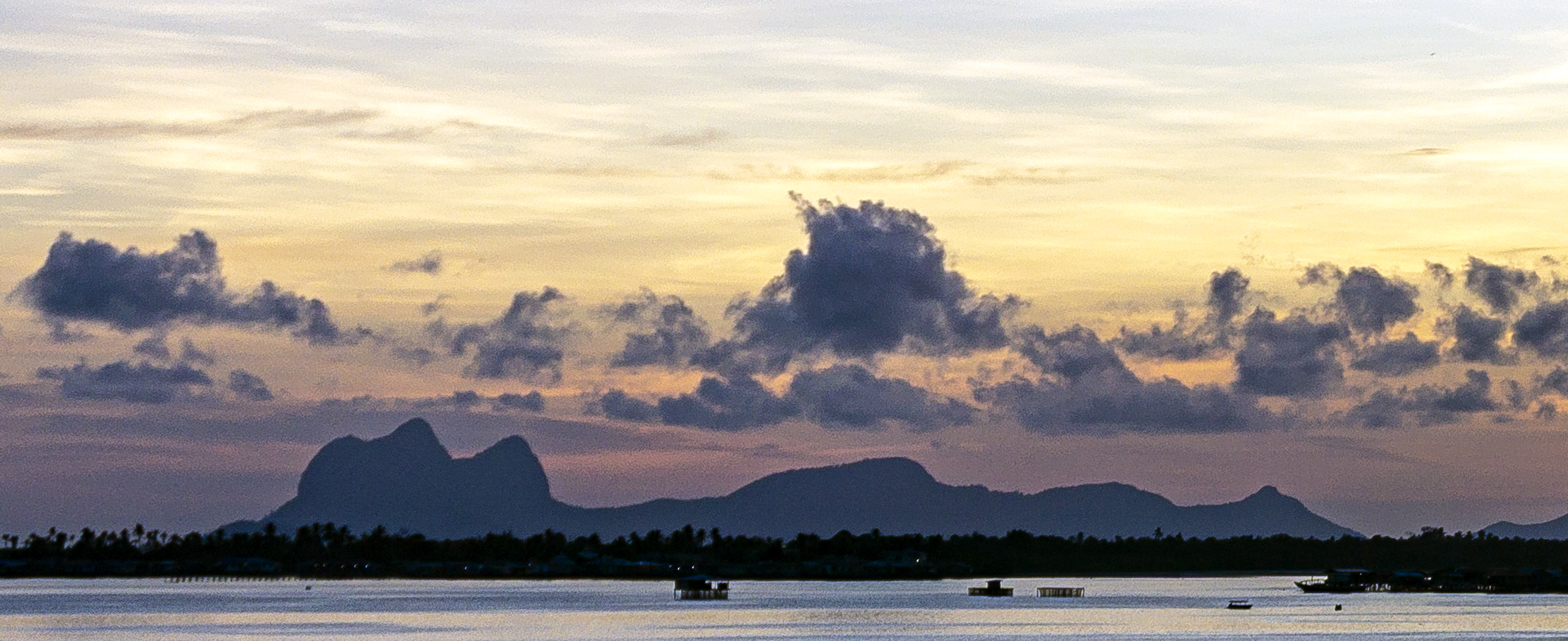
- A panorama view of Tun Sakaran Marine Park

- Location within Borneo
- Location: Sabah, Malaysia
- Nearest city: Semporna
- Coordinates: 4°36′N 118°42′E
- Area: 101 km^{2} (39 sq mi)
- Established: 2004
- Governing body: Sabah Parks

Tun Sakaran Marine Park, also known as Semporna Islands Park, is a marine park located off the east coast of Sabah, Malaysia. It consists of the islands of Bodgaya, Boheydulang, Sebangkat, and Salakan, the sand cays of Maiga, Sibuan, and Mantabuan, and the patch reefs of Church and Kapikan. In 2004, the park became the seventh gazetted area under Sabah Parks with a total area of 350 km^{2}. There are approximately 2,000 people living within the park, most of whom consist of the nomadic Bajau Laut (Sea Gypsies) people, who live in stilt houses and houseboats in and around the marine park. To this day, out of the eight islands, there is only one island (Sebangkat) that has an owner and legal grant holder after the gazetting in 2004.

== History ==
Bodgaya was first gazetted in 1933 as a forest reserve, while Boheydulang as a bird sanctuary. Proposals to establish a state park was first made in 1977. Later in 1998, a collaboration, known as the Semporna Islands Project, between the Marine Conservation Society (MCS), Sabah Parks, WWF Malaysia and Nature Link took place. It was funded by the European Community under its global environment budget line. Finally in 2004 the islands were gazetted as a state park by Sabah Parks.
