= Sugud Islands Marine Conservation Area =

Marine protected area in Beluran district in Sabah, Malaysia

The Sugud Islands Marine Conservation Area (SIMCA) is a Category II MPA in Beluran district in Sabah, Malaysia, comprising Lankayan Island, Billean, Tegaipil and surrounding waters. The government of Sabah, Malaysia prohibits in the area, a total of over 463 square kilometres, all resource harvesting (including all capturing of live creatures) and charges a fee to all visitors of the area.
