= Talang Satang National Park =

National park in Sarawak, Malaysia

- IUCN category II (national park)
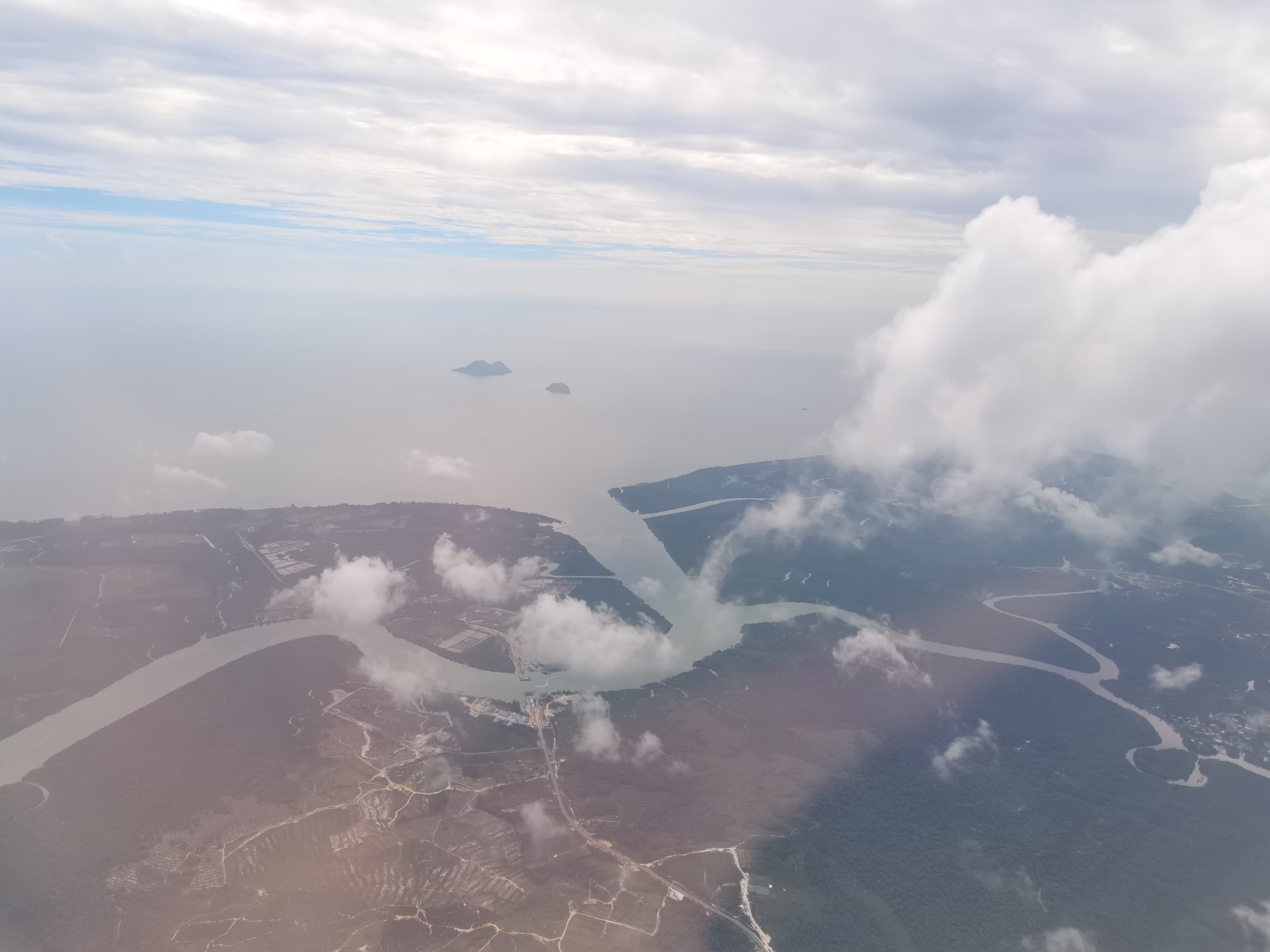
- Satang portion of the national park near the mouth of the Rambungan River showing Satang Besar and Satang Kecil Islands.
- Interactive map of Talang Satang National Park
- Location: Sarawak, Malaysia
- Nearest city: Kuching
- Coordinates: 1°47′N 110°10′E
- Area: 19,414 ha (74.96 sq mi)
- Established: September 1999
- Governing body: Sarawak Forestry Corporation

Talang Satang National Park (Malay: Taman Negara Talang Satang) is the first marine conservation area of Sarawak, encompasses an area of 19,414 hectares (47,970 acres) and the shore and waters appertaining there to of four islands off the Sarawak coast. The islands are renowned for sheltering Sarawak's highest population of nesting hawksbill and green turtles, both of which are listed as endangered species. The local marine environment also offers an essential breeding, nursery, and feeding habitat for an array of marine species.

== History ==
Turtle conservation at Talang-Satang National Park involves a multifaceted approach addressing both historical and legal complexities. Since its gazettement in September 1999, the park has served as a protected area for Sarawak's Turtle Islands, enabling conservation efforts not only at the nesting beaches but also across the wider marine range of the turtles.

== Geography ==
The Talang Satang National Park is 19,414 hectares in area and encompasses the seaward and surrounding waters of four islands: Pulau Talang-Talang Besar and Pulau Talang-Talang Kecil off Sematan, and Pulau Satang Besar and Pulau Satang Kecil off Santubong. The four islands collectively known as Sarawak's Turtle Islands are encircled by shallow coral reefs that serve as critical refuges and resting places for sea turtles. The reef communities and surrounding marine ecosystems provide significant ecological benefits to the park, supporting a range of marine species.

Topography of Talang and Satang Islands consists of sandy beaches that are major nesting sites for marine turtles, particularly on Pulau Satang Besar and the Talang-Talang Islands. The sandy beaches exposed to continuous wave action also support intertidal animals such as burrowing invertebrates from dynamic coastal habitats. In addition to sandy shores, parts of the islands' shores are lined by rocky outcrops, in which organisms are distributed within tidal zones. This variety of coastal habitats contributes to the islands' ecological diversity and totheir conservation significance.

The islands are located just off the coast of the Santubong area. The Satang Besar Island is 30 minute boeat ride from Damai Beach or Telaga Air Jetty. The average water depth here is 10 metres, with a temperature of 30 °C.

== Biodiversity ==
Talang-Talang Island is one of the largest protected coral reefs in Sarawak, including hard and soft coral reefs, and also serves as a breeding site for the endangered turtles. Five species of marine turtles are known to nest from April to September, including Green Turtle (Chelonia mydas), Hawksbill Turtle (Eretmochelys imbricata), Olive Ridley, Leatherback, and Loggerhead Turtles.

== Conservation ==
As part of comprehensive works on Sarawak coastal ecosystems, seagrass species have been recorded at Talang-Talang Island. Though the island is less diverse in seagrass species richness in the state, its accessions are worth noting, with its collections as part of the eight species recorded across Sarawak.

The coral reef encircling the Talang-Talang Islands is severely impactedby sedimentation, primarily due to river runoff from the Kayan and Sematan Rivers. The supply of sediments, which has an implicit nexus to land use and deforestation, covers up coral reefs and helps support the growth of macroalgae. Consequently, a majority of the dead corals in the area are now buried in algae and sediment and still presentongoing issues with regard to reef health, resilience, and natural regeneration.

In Talang Satang National Park, numerous conservation activities are focused on protecting coral reefs and seagrass habitats. They include annual reef cleaning exercises involving volunteers and government agencies, frequent monitoring of reef health, and collaborative studies with local universities. Continuous monitoring of seagrass is also maintained in the park to observe seasonally fluctuating species composition, density, distribution, and water quality.

Other programmes that are put in place for the conservation of coral reefs are the placement of reef balls to protect the coral reef system in the Talang-Talang Besar Island. In 2011, the Malaysian Department of Environment (DOE) listed Talang Talang Besar Island as one of the 10 best islands in Malaysia.

The Satang Besar Island is the site for a turtle hatchery and conservation programme, in which is restricted to bona fide researchers, students, conservation organisations and organised tours monitored by Sarawak Forestry Corporation wardens.

== Tourism ==
The national park is also important for eco-tourism activities for its sandy beaches and scenic views.

== Water quality ==
In 2015, the biochemical oxygen demand (BOD) was under class 3 (moderately clean). Meanwhile, nitrate and organophosphate levels were within class 3 (moderate clean). The heavy metals concentration, such as manganese and nickel, was class 1 to 2 (very good to good condition), while arsenic, copper and zinc levels were class 3 (moderately clean).
