= Darvel Bay =

Bay in Malaysia

Coordinates: 4°48′N 118°39′E

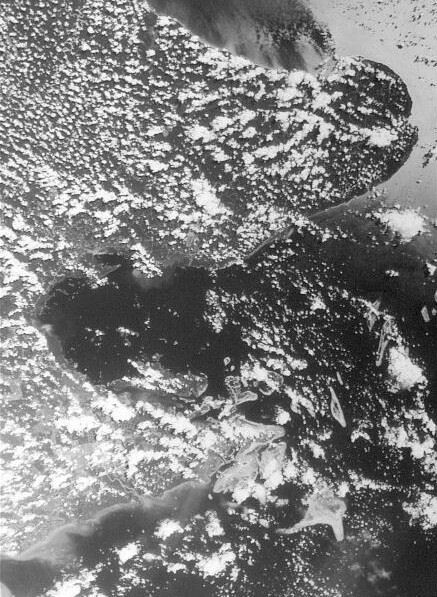
Satellite image of Darvel Bay, 27 July 1980

Darvel Bay (Teluk Darvel) or Lahad Datu Bay (Teluk Lahad Datu) is a bight (large bay) on the east side of Sabah, Malaysia. It is the largest semi-enclosed bay on the east coast of Borneo and faces the Sulawesi Sea. Administratively, it is within Tawau Division, with Lahad Datu District on the north side, Kunak District in the middle and Semporna District to the south of the bay.

== Geography ==
Large parts of the shore of Darval Bay are mangrove swamps. Within the bay there are numerous islands, the largest, Timbun Mata Island, is located near the southern shore.

== History ==
The area around Darvel Bay has been inhabited for over 20,000 years. The limestone caves on the mainland and on the islands were used for prehistoric burials.

Darvel Bay was a traditional haunt for pirates up to the end of the 19th century. Among the most famous pirates was Datu Kudunding. The British operated the Darvel Bay Tobacco Plantations Ltd, in Lahad Datu District which was immortalized in the documentary film Urban Bioscope Expedition through Borneo by H. M. Lomas.
