= Lankayan Island =

Island of Sabah, Malaysia

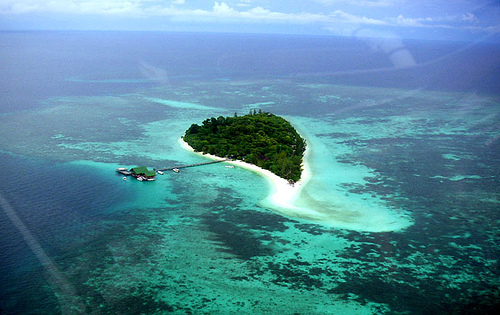
- Interactive map of Lankayan Island

Geography
- Coordinates: 6°30′0″N 117°55′0″E

Administration
- Malaysia
- State: Sabah
- Division: Sandakan
- District: Beluran

Lankayan Island (Malay: Pulau Lankayan) is a small tropical coral resort island in Beluran, Sabah, Malaysia in the Sulu Sea.

Lankayan Island has many species of attractive flora and fauna. The only resort on the island, Lankayan Island Dive Resort, was built in 1997. Divers are attracted by myriad macro marine life, coral and sunken wrecks. Lankayan Island is known for its whale shark sightings.

The fauna that inhabit the waters of the island include scads, yellow tail barracudas, and jacks. Other fauna include blacktip sharks, giant clams, claw anemone fishes, decorator and spider crabs, coral shrimps, nudibranchs, prawn gobies, seahorses, ghost pipefish, flying gurnards, parrotfishes, rays and guitarfish. The indigenous plants include casuarina trees and pandan screwpine.

Green and hawksbill sea turtles make this island a key nesting spot in the Sulu Sea. The turtles are banded by the local marine preserve staff, the eggs are retrieved and counted, and then reburied in a fenced off nursery area to prevent poaching and predation, and to assist in documenting turtle productivity. After hatching, the live birth count is recorded and then the young turtles are safely released to sea.

On 13 October 2003, Lankayan Island was declared part of the Sugud Islands Marine Conservation Area (SIMCA). As part of SIMCA, all resource harvesting (fishing etc.) will be prohibited by the state government of Sabah, Malaysia.

== Transportation ==
The transfer to Lankayan is by speedboat departing from the Sandakan Yacht Club and takes about two hours.

== See also ==
- List of islands of Malaysia
