= 2009 in Malaysia =

- Decades: 1980s; 1990s; 2000s; 2010s; 2020s
- See also: Other events of 2009; History of Malaysia • Timeline • Years

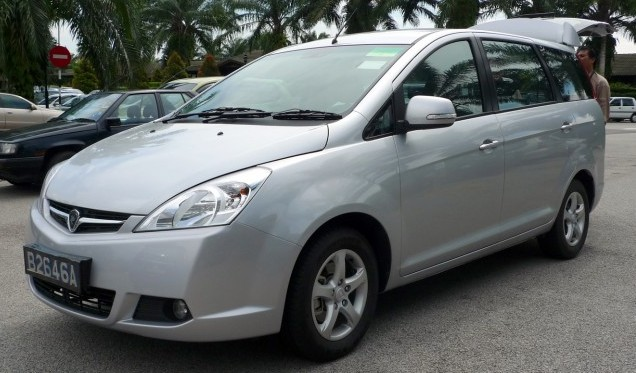
Proton Exora, Proton's first MPV.

This article lists important figures and events in Malaysian public affairs during the year 2009, together with the deaths of notable Malaysians. 2009 marked is 52nd anniversary of Malaysia's Independence. Malaysia hosted the 2009 ASEAN Para Games between 15 and 19 August. Malaysia recorded more than 2,000 confirmed cases of influenza A(H1N1) ("swine flu") and 76 deaths during a world pandemic of the disease.

== Incumbent political figures ==
=== Federal level ===
- Yang di-Pertuan Agong: Sultan Mizan Zainal Abidin of Terengganu
- Raja Permaisuri Agong: Sultanah Nur Zahirah of Terengganu
- Deputy Yang di-Pertuan Agong: Sultan Abdul Halim Mu'adzam Shah of Kedah
- Prime Minister:
  - Tun Abdullah Ahmad Badawi (until 3 April)
  - Dato' Sri Mohammad Najib Abdul Razak (from 3 April)
- Deputy Prime Minister:
  - Dato' Sri Mohammad Najib Abdul Razak (until 3 April)
  - Tan Sri Dato' Haji Muhyiddin Yassin (from 10 April)
- President of the Dewan Negara:
  - Tan Sri Dato' Seri Dr. Abdul Hamid Pawanteh (until 6 July)
  - Tan Sri Ir. Wong Foon Meng (from 7 July)
- Speaker of the Dewan Rakyat: Tan Sri Datuk Seri Panglima Pandikar Amin Mulia
- Chief Justice: Tun Dato' Seri Zaki Azmi

=== State level ===
- Johor:
  - Sultan of Johor: Sultan Iskandar
  - Menteri Besar of Johor: Abdul Ghani Othman
- Kedah:
  - Sultan of Kedah: Sultan Abdul Halim Mu'adzam Shah
  - Menteri Besar of Kedah: Azizan Abdul Razak
- Kelantan:
  - Sultan of Kelantan: Sultan Ismail Petra
  - Menteri Besar of Kelantan: Nik Abdul Aziz Nik Mat
- Perlis:
  - Raja of Perlis: Tuanku Syed Sirajuddin
  - Menteri Besar of Perlis: Md Isa Sabu
- Perak:
  - Sultan of Perak: Sultan Azlan Muhibbuddin Shah
  - Menteri Besar of Perak:
    - Mohammad Nizar Jamaluddin (until 6 February)
    - Zambry Abdul Kadir (from 12 May)

see 2009 Perak constitutional crisis

- Pahang:
  - Sultan of Pahang: Sultan Haji Ahmad Shah Al-Musta'in Billah
  - Menteri Besar of Pahang: Adnan Yaakob
- Selangor:
  - Sultan of Selangor: Sultan Sharafuddin Idris Shah
  - Menteri Besar of Selangor: Abdul Khalid Ibrahim
- Terengganu:
  - Sultan of Terengganu: Tengku Muhammad Ismail (Regent)
  - Menteri Besar of Terengganu: Ahmad Said
- Negeri Sembilan:
  - Yang di-Pertuan Besar of Negeri Sembilan: Tuanku Muhriz
  - Menteri Besar of Negeri Sembilan: Mohamad Hasan
- Penang:
  - Governor of Penang: Tun Abdul Rahman Abbas
  - Chief Minister of Penang: Lim Guan Eng
- Malacca:
  - Governor of Malacca: Tun Mohd Khalid Yaakob
  - Chief Minister of Malacca: Mohd Ali Rustam
- Sarawak:
  - Governor of Sarawak: Tun Abang Muhammad Salahuddin
  - Chief Minister of Sarawak: Abdul Taib Mahmud
- Sabah:
  - Governor of Sabah: Tun Ahmadshah Abdullah
  - Chief Minister of Sabah: Musa Aman

== Events ==
=== January ===
- 1 January
  - Compulsory use of rear seat belts begins to be enforced.
  - The Anti-Corruption Agency changes its name to the Malaysian Anti-Corruption Commission.
  - Graphic images on cigarette packs to show the adverse long-term effects of excessive smoking are introduced.
- 2 January – Ten people are killed and five are injured in an accident involving three vehicles on Gua Musang Highway near Bukit Sejuk, Gua Musang, Kelantan.
- 6–17 January – 2009 Kuala Terengganu by-election – Pan-Malaysian Islamic Party candidate Mohd Abdul Wahid Endut won with a total majority of 2,631 votes beating the Barisan Nasional candidate Datuk Wan Ahmad Wan Farid Wan Salleh.
- 12 January
  - Members of parliament from the government and the opposition join forces to condemn the Israeli incursion into Gaza. Parliament passes ten resolutions on Israel's atrocities in Gaza to the United States Congress and parliaments of Britain and the European Union.
  - A rock slide at the Perak Caves Buddhist temple, which is built into a cave, kills one person and traps more than a dozen others for hours near Ipoh, Perak.
- 23 January – Suspected car thief Kugan Ananthan, aged 22, dies five days after being arrested by police in Subang Jaya. Attorney-General Tan Sri Abdul Gani Patail classifies Kugan's death as murder.

=== February ===
- 3 February – The Sultan of Perak, Azlan Shah, celebrates the silver jubilee of his reign in the state.
- 4 February – The Pakatan Rakyat government in Perak collapses after three of that party's legislators defect. Barisan Nasional claims the right to form a new government.
- 6 February – Pangkor state assemblyman Zambry Abdul Kadir is sworn in as the new Menteri Besar of Perak in front of the Sultan of Perak, Sultan Azlan Muhibbuddin Shah at Istana Iskandariah, Kuala Kangsar, Perak. Malaysian police fire tear gas at Pakatan Rakyat supporters protesting against the government seizing power in state of Perak, fueling a tense political standoff.
- 9 February – Arumugam Vengatarakoo, a Kedah state assemblyman and member of the Kedah State Executive Council, resigned from both seats.
- 9–15 February – The 2009 edition of Le Tour de Langkawi occurs.
- 14 February – Tolls are no longer collected at the PJS 2 toll plaza heading toward Kuala Lumpur on the New Pantai Expressway near Petaling Jaya, Selangor.
- 17 February – Elizabeth Wong, a Parti Keadilan Rakyat legislator and Bukit Lanjan, Selangor's state assemblywoman, resigns after photos of her sleeping nude were spread via MMS.
- 18 February – The Menteri Besar of Perak, Zambry Abdul Kadir, is suspended for 18 months from attending the state legislative assembly.
- 24 February – The Malaysian Anti-Corruption Commission is launched.
- 25 February – The Salak Jaya toll plaza (south bound) on Sungai Besi Expressway is abolished and the future expansion of the Besraya Expressway to the Kuala Lumpur Middle Ring Road 2 near Pandan is announced.

=== March ===
- 3 March
  - Three Malaysians are among seven people who are killed in a hotel blaze in Taipei, Taiwan.
  - Thousands of people are left trapped and stranded in buildings, bus stations and light rail transit stations in Kuala Lumpur after flash floods following a heavy downpour at 3:00 pm.
- 7 March – Riot police fire tear gas into several hundreds of people marching from National Mosque to Istana Negara in Kuala Lumpur to protest the use of English in the teaching of mathematics and science.
- 16 March
  - RTM's third channel, Muzik Aktif is launched, broadcasting from Angkasapuri, Kuala Lumpur.
  - Brunei is said to have dropped its long-standing claim over Sarawak's Limbang District when the two countries resolved various land and maritime territory disputes. However, a Bruneian official claims the issue was never discussed.
- 17 March – Chief Minister of Malacca, Datuk Seri Wira Mohd Ali Rustam is suspended from contesting the post of United Malays National Organisation deputy president as he was found guilty under Article 10.1 of the UMNO Members Code of Ethics, which regards bribery and money politics.
- 26 March – Tan Sri Muhyiddin Yassin wins the UMNO deputy president election with 1,575 votes beating Tan Sri Muhammad Muhammad Taib with 916 votes.
- 28 March – The lights of the world's tallest twin towers, Petronas Twin Towers in Kuala Lumpur and the city of Putrajaya were turned off during Earth Hour.

=== April ===
- 2 April – 1 Malaysia is launched.
- 3 April – Mohammad Najib Abdul Razak becomes the sixth Malaysian Prime Minister, replacing Abdullah Ahmad Badawi.
- 4 April – Former Prime Minister Mahathir Mohamad rejoins UMNO.
- 7 April – The by-elections for Bukit Gantang, Bukit Selambau and Batang Ai. Barisan Nasional wins in Batang Ai and Pakatan Rakyat (PR) wins in Bukit Selambau and Bukit Gantang.
- 9 April – Muhyiddin Yassin is appointed Deputy Prime Minister of Malaysia.
- 13 April – Six people are killed in a double-decker express bus crash at km 443 of the North–South Expressway near Rawang, Selangor.
- 14 April
  - Kota Iskandar in Iskandar Puteri becomes Johor's state new administrative capital after Johor Bahru.
  - Proton Exora, Proton's first MPV is launched.
- 16 April – Penang Deputy Chief Minister and state assemblyperson Mohammad Fairus Khairuddin resigns the state assembly seat of Penanti regarding allegations over his non-performance in public office and corruption allegations.
- 24 April – Lumut, Perak the home base of the Royal Malaysian Navy is declared "Naval Town".
- 27 April – The Royal Malaysian Navy celebrates its diamond jubilee (75th anniversary).

=== May ===
- 7 May – Pakatan Rakyat (PR) state Speaker V. Sivakumar is removed from the Perak State Assembly and ex-Sungkai state assemblyman Datuk S. Ganesan takes his oath as the new Speaker. Police arrest dozens of protesters, including three opposition MPs, in a standoff near the Perak State Secretariat Building in Ipoh.
- 9 May
  - Three Hindu Rights Action Force leaders were released.
  - Singapore's most-wanted fugitive, Jemaah Islamiyah leader Mas Selamat Kastari, was arrested in Skudai, Johor.
- 11 May – The High Court rules Dato' Seri Ir. Mohammad Nizar Jamaluddin the legitimate Menteri Besar of Perak, but Dato' Seri DiRaja Zambry Abdul Kadir remains in power.
- 15 May – 2009 swine flu pandemic
  - The Ministry of Health confirms the first case of influenza A (H1N1) in a 21-year-old male student who had arrived at the Kuala Lumpur International Airport on 13 May via a Malaysia Airlines flight (MH091) from Newark.
- 18 May – Barisan Nasional announces they will not contest the 31 May Penanti by-election in Penang.
- 22 May
  - The Court of Appeal of Malaysia rules Zambry Abdul Kadir the legitimate Menteri Besar of Perak.
  - Malaysia plans to build the third crossing bridge connecting Pengerang in the east of Johor to Changi in Singapore.
- 26 May – Hunger strike in Perak: 19 Pakatan Rakyat assemblymen and supporters are arrested then released on police bail about five hours later after having had their statements recorded.
- 29 May – The Imago Jaya Supermarket in Petaling Jaya, Selangor collapses while being torn down for redevelopment. Seven workers were killed, mostly Indonesians.
- 31 May – 2009 Penanti by-election, People's Justice Party (Malaysia) candidate Mansor Othman wins with a total majority of 1048 votes, beating Aminah Abdullah, Nai-Khan Ari and Kamarul Ramizu Idris, three independent candidates.

=== June ===
- 1 June – TV3 celebrates its 25th anniversary.
- 2 June – The roof of the Sultan Mizan Zainal Abidin Stadium in Kuala Terengganu, Terengganu collapses.
- 6 June – The late wife of Abdullah Ahmad Badawi, Endon Mahmood, is conferred the Seri Setia Mahkota Malaysia, which carries the title "Tun", by the Yang di-Pertuan Agong Sultan Mizan Zainal Abidin of Terengganu.
- 7–17 June – 2009 Men's Hockey Junior World Cup Malaysia–Singapore
- 16 June – Nor Azami Ahmad Ghazali, leader of the illegal Federal Special Forces of Malaysia (FSFM) and 42 people are arrested in Taman Gombak Jaya, Selangor.
- 17 June – 2009 swine flu pandemic
  - The first local infection of influenza A (H1N1) is reported, as the infected person had no history of having traveled to a country that had the flu.
- 18 June – 2009 swine flu pandemic
  - Following the pandemic, Deputy Prime Minister Tan Sri Muhyiddin Yassin declares that all visitors and Malaysians returning from abroad would be required to fill in a health declaration form.
- 21 June – Lee Chong Wei of Malaysia defeats Indonesian ace Taufik Hidayat to win the Indonesia Super Series.
- 22 June – 2009 swine flu pandemic
  - The SJKC Jalan Davidson Chinese primary school in Kuala Lumpur becomes the first school to be closed due to the Influenza A (H1N1) virus.
  - The MEASAT-3A satellite is launched from Baikonur Cosmodrome, Kazakhstan.
- 29 June – 7 July - Malaysia at the 2009 Asian Youth Games in Singapore.

=== July ===
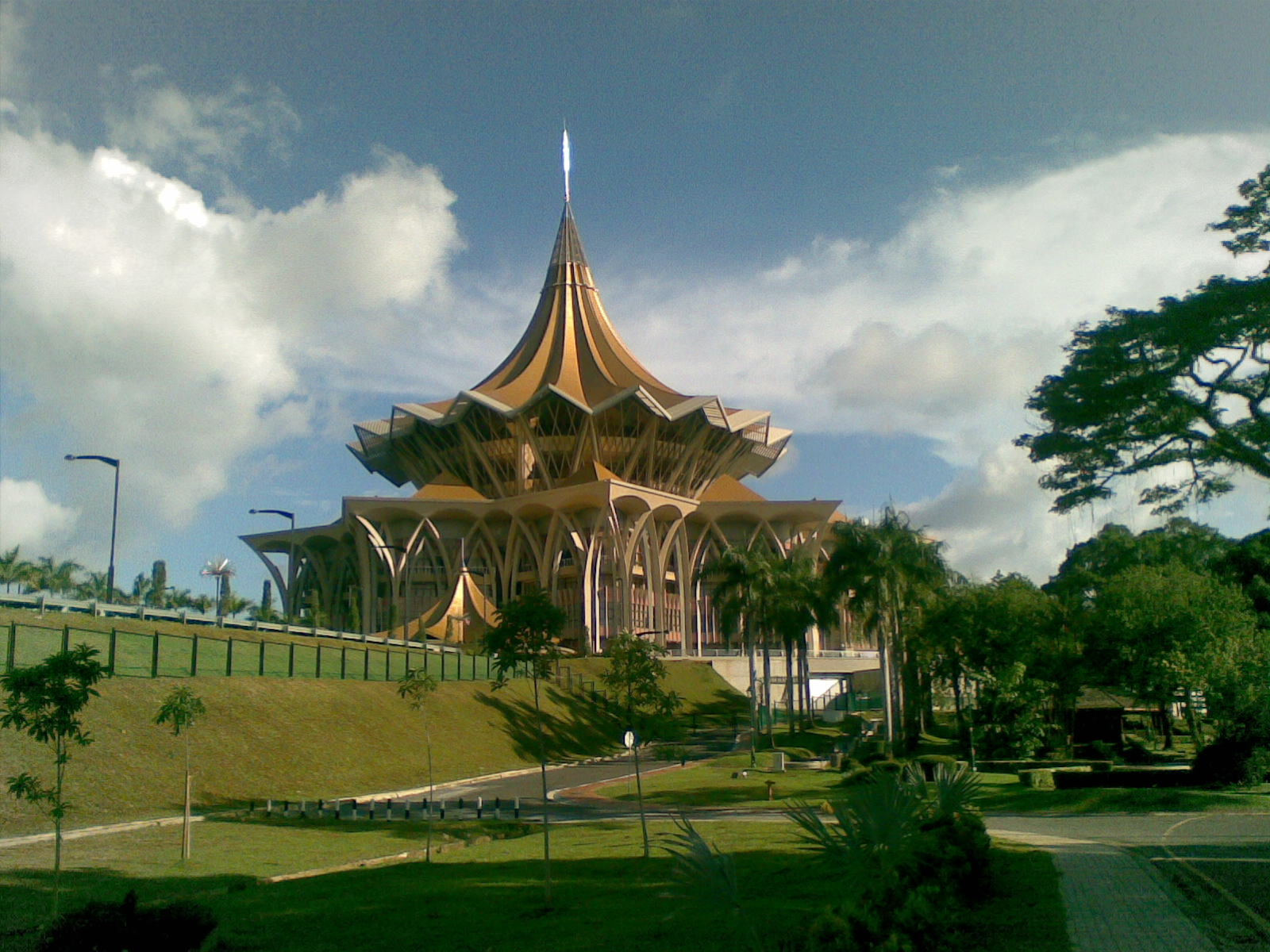
The new Sarawak state legislative assembly building situated beside The Astana in Kuching, Sarawak.

- 1 July – The Kedah DAP decides to leave the Pakatan Rakyat, citing "undelivered promises" by the state government as one of the reasons.
- 8 July – The Cabinet decides that all national primary and secondary schools would teach science and mathematics in Malay and mother tongue for national-type primary schools beginning in 2012.
- 14 July
  - PAS candidate Mohd Fauzi Abdullah wins the 2009 Manek Urai by-election with a total majority of 65 votes beating Barisan Nasional (BN) candidate Tuan Aziz Tuan Mat.
  - It is announced that, beginning 1 September, the 20 per cent expressway toll rebate given to motorists who paid toll charges more than 80 times a month will be able to be saved for up to six months. The rebate will be redeemable at 126 locations which have yet to be announced.
  - Malaysia's second micro satellite, Razak SAT, is launched into orbit.
- 16 July – The political secretary of Seri Kembangan state assemblyman Ean Yong Hian Wah, Teoh Beng Hock, is found dead at the premises of the Malaysian Anti-Corruption Commission Selangor state headquarters at its 14th floor office in Plaza Masalam, Shah Alam, Selangor.
- 18–20 July – Manchester United F.C. Asia Tour 2009: Manchester United F.C. vs Malaysia XI
- 23 July – 2009 swine flu pandemic
  - A 30-year-old Indonesian man becomes the first death from influenza A (H1N1). However, the Health Minister, Datuk Liow Tiong Lai reveals that the flu was not the direct cause of the victim's death since he suffered from multiple medical conditions, including obesity and enlarged heart.
- 26 July – A road collapse at Lorong Gelugor near Jalan San Peng, Kuala Lumpur forces the evacuation of residents of 22 units of Public Works Department (JKR) and Kuala Lumpur City Hall (DBKL) quarters.
- 27 July – The new Sarawak State Legislative Assembly Building in Kuching, Sarawak is officially opened by Yang di-Pertuan Agong Sultan Mizan Zainal Abidin of Terengganu.
- 31 July – The Amanah Sahah 1Malaysia (AS1M) scheme is launched.

=== August ===
- 1–9 August — Malaysia at the 2009 Asian Martial Arts Games in Bangkok, Thailand.
- 1 August – Riot police fire water cannons and tear gas and arrest dozens of demonstrators during a rally against the Internal Security Act in Kuala Lumpur.
- 9 August – 2009 swine flu pandemic
  - The death toll from the influenza A (H1N1) reaches 26 people. The government considers drastic measures to contain the situation.
  - The teaching of mathematics and science in English is extended to 2014. The current cohort of students studying mathematics and science in English is allowed to continue to do so until they finished secondary school.
- 11 August – 2009 swine flu pandemic
  - Total confirmed cases of the influenza A (H1N1) reaches 2,253.
- 14 August – 2009 swine flu pandemic
  - The death toll of the influenza A (H1N1) reaches 56 people.
- 15 August – 2009 ASEAN Para Games:
  - The 2009 ASEAN Para Games opening ceremony is held in Putra Indoor Stadium. The games are opened by former Prime Minister, Abdullah Ahmad Badawi. This was the second time Malaysia hosted the games and its first time since 2001.
  - Around 980 athletes from ten nations participate in the Games, which feature 409 events in eleven sports.
- 16 August – A British pilot is killed when his plane crashes during takeoff on a test flight in Tekah Airfield, Taiping, Perak.
- 17 August – 2009 swine flu pandemic
  - The death toll from influenza A (H1N1) reaches 64. The government considers declaring a national health emergency.
- 19 August – Nine Chinese crew members of Liberian-registered tanker MT Formosa Product Brick are lost when the ship catches fire after a collision with a bulk carrier in the Straits of Malacca near Port Dickson, Negeri Sembilan.
- 19 August – 2009 ASEAN Para Games:
  - The 2009 ASEAN Para Games closing ceremony is held in the Putra Indoor Stadium. The games were closed by Minister of Youth and Sports, Ahmad Shabery Cheek.
  - Malaysia won 94 gold medals, 81 silver medals and 71 bronze medals in this games and ranked overall in second place.
- 20 August – 2009 swine flu pandemic
  - Malaysia records its highest number of influenza A (H1N1) cases in a day with 69 infections.
  - A vehicle belonging to the Malaysian Anti-Corruption Commission parked at the old district and land office in Klang, Selangor is damaged after a Molotov cocktail was thrown at it.
- 23 August – Lunas state assemblyman Mohd Radzhi Salleh quits Parti Keadilan Rakyat to become an independent member of the Kedah state legislative assembly.
- 25 August – Permatang Pasir by-election, 2009: PAS candidate Salleh Man wins the election with a total majority of 4,551 votes, beating Barisan Nasional candidate Rohaizat Othman.
- 27 August – Malaysian Chinese Association deputy president Chua Soi Lek is sacked from the party.
- 31 August
  - The 52nd Merdeka Day celebration is held at the Malaysian Houses of Parliament for the first time.
  - An express train from Kuala Lumpur to Singapore, carrying 243 passengers, derails in Batu Enam near Segamat, Johor, injuring 17 passengers including three Singaporeans.

=== September ===
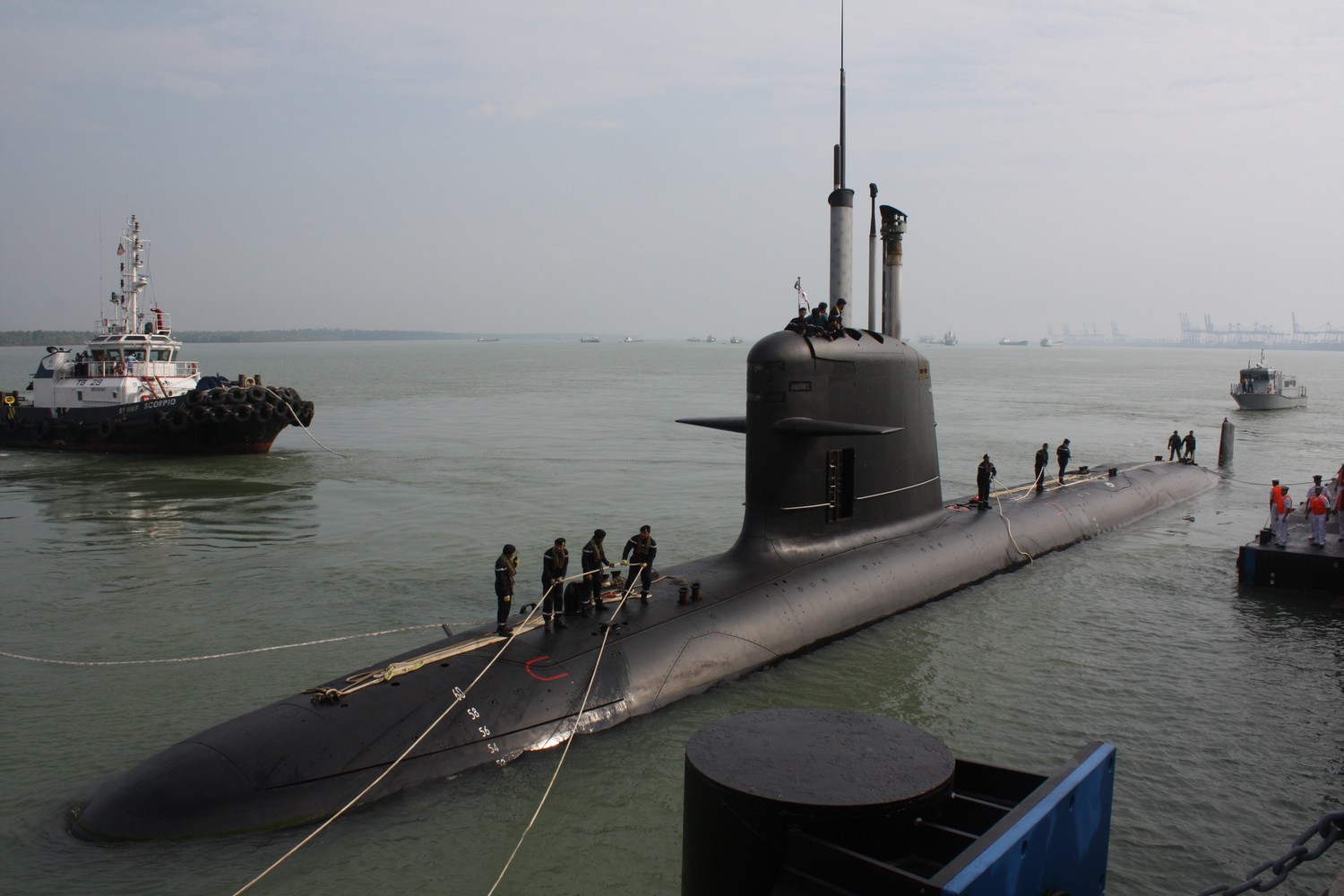
KD Tunku Abdul Rahman, Malaysia's first submarine.

- 1 September – "French Spider-Man" Alain Robert is arrested after he successfully scales Petronas Twin Towers in his third attempt to climb the nation's tallest structure.
- 3 September – Malaysia's first ever submarine KD Tunku Abdul Rahman arrives in Port Klang, Selangor.
- 9 September – The Malaysians Unite for Road Safety (MUFROS) 090909 campaign is launched.
- 11 September – Two pilots in a light aircraft are killed when an aircraft crashes as it is coming in to land at the Langkawi International Airport on Langkawi, Kedah.
- 14 September – 19 houses at the Kampung Buah Pala in Penang are demolished.
- 15 September
  - The new Malaysia's own Formula One team, "Lotus F1 Racing" is launched.
  - 2009 swine flu pandemic
    - The death toll from influenza A (H1N1) reaches 76.
- 17 September – A regional militant leader and terrorist, Noordin Mohammad Top is killed during a police raid in Solo, Central Java, Indonesia.
- 25 September – The Automated Enforcement System (AES) is introduced for all expressways and highways in Malaysia.
- 28 September–4 October – ATP Proton Malaysian Open tennis 2009

=== October ===
- 1 October – The National Language Month of Bulan Bahasa Kebangsaan is launched.
- 2 October – Noordin Mohammad Top's body is brought back to Malaysia and buried at Kampung Kayu Ara Pasong in Pontian, Johor.
- 4 October – Mohammad Najib Abdul Razak visits France for the first time and meets the president Nicolas Sarkozy.
- 8 October – A fire breaks out on board KD Sri Inderapura in Lumut Naval Base, Perak.
- 9 October – Former MCA president Ling Liong Sik fractured his right arm after a fall in his house.
- 11 October – 2009 Bagan Pinang by-election, Barisan Nasional candidate Tan Sri Mohd Isa Abdul Samad wins this election with a total majority of 5,435 votes beating PAS candidates Zulkefly Mohamad Omar.
- 19 October – Malaysia Day on 16 September was declared as the annual national public holiday starting from 2010.
- 26 October
  - Tuanku Muhriz of Negeri Sembilan becomes the 11th Yang di-Pertuan Besar of Negeri Sembilan.
  - About 22 schoolchildren plunge into a river when a suspension bridge they were crossing collapses in Kuala Dipang near Kampar, Perak. 19 of them are rescued and three die.
- 28 October – Datuk Dr Jeffrey Kitingan resigns as vice-president of Parti Keadilan Rakyat in Sabah.
- 29 October – Port Klang state assemblyman Badrul Hisham Abdullah quits Parti Keadilan Rakyat with immediate effect to become an independent representative supporting the Barisan Nasional.
- 30 October – An Eagle light aircraft of the Royal Selangor Flying Club crashes near the Beringin Golf Club in Lembah Beringin near Kuala Kubu Bharu, Selangor, killing the trainee pilot who was flying solo from Ipoh, Perak to Subang, Selangor.
- 30 October – 8 November — Malaysia at the 2009 Asian Indoor Games in Hanoi, Vietnam.

=== November ===
- 1 November – Former Perlis mufti Dr Mohd Asri Zainul Abidin is arrested by the Selangor Religious Affairs Department (JAIS) officials as he is conducting a religious class.
- 3 November – A massive landslide in Selayang, Selangor forces the closure of the Kuala Lumpur–Rawang Highway.
- 4 November – Kelantan is awarded the "Wang Ehsan" compassionate payment from the federal government from the state's offshore oil production revenue starting 2010.
- 7–23 November – A massive flash flood affects Kelantan, Terengganu and Pahang. Two people die and 5,000 people are evacuated.
- 10 November – Chinese president Hu Jintao visits Malaysia, becoming the first Chinese head of state to do so in fifteen years.
- 16 November – The Kota Siputeh state seat in Kedah is declared vacant by the High Court.
- 16–17 November – Youth Engagement Summit takes place at Kuala Lumpur.
- 18 November – Former Perlis mufti Dr Mohd Asri Zainul Abidin is tried at the Gombak Timur Lower Syariah Court, Selangor on a charge of teaching aspects related to Islam without certification.
- 21 November – The body of Teoh Beng Hock, the political secretary of Seri Kembangan state assemblyman Ean Yong Hian Wah, is exhumed from the Nirvana Memorial Park in Semenyih, Selangor for a second autopsy at Sungai Buloh Hospital.
- 22 November — 2009 Penang Bridge International Marathon.
- 23 November – Perodua Alza, Perodua's first MPV is launched.
- 24 November – The body of Teoh Beng Hock, the political secretary of Seri Kembangan state assemblyman Ean Yong Hian Wah, is laid to rest for the second time, three days after his remains were exhumed for a second autopsy at Sungai Buloh Hospital.
- 25 November – The Selangor state government issues a ban prohibiting state civil servants, employees of state subsidiaries, and students at state-owned institutions from attending the courses of the controversial National Civics Bureau.
- 30 November – A powerful explosion rips through a mamak restaurant in Stulang, near Johor Bahru, Johor, jolting dozens of nearby residents from their sleep. No one is injured in the incident, which is believed to have been caused by a powerful bomb made of plastic explosives.

=== December ===
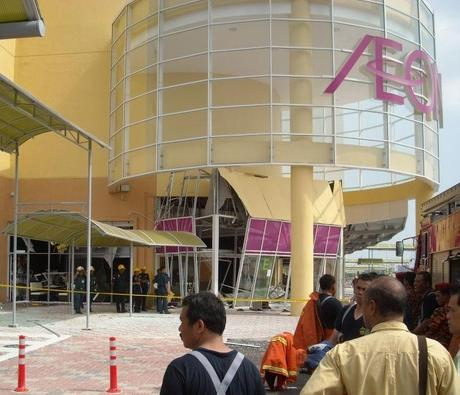
Picture of the gas explosion at AEON Bandaraya Melaka Shopping Centre in Melaka.

- 2 December – The Penang state government followed Selangor's action in banning all state civil servants from attending National Civics Bureau courses.
- 4 December – Malaysian Anti-Corruption Commission Chief Commissioner Datuk Seri Ahmad Said Hamdan resigns.
- 6 December – Two nursing students at a private college are killed and four others injured when a car plunges from the third-floor car park of the KB Mall shopping complex and lands on the shopping area in Kota Bharu, Kelantan.
- 9 December – Mohammad Najib Abdul Razak and Thai prime minister Abhisit Vejjajiva visit Narathiwat in Southern Thailand.
- 9–18 December — Malaysia at the 2009 SEA Games in Vientiane, Laos.
- 10 December – Former Port Klang Authority general manager Datin Paduka O.C. Phang is tried at the Klang Sessions Court on three counts of criminal breach of trust amounting to a total of RM254 million over the Port Klang Free Zone scandal.
- 14 December
  - Deputy Tourism Minister, Datuk Seri Sulaiman Abdul Rahman Abdul Taib resigns.
  - A gas explosion at the soon-to-be-opened RM288 million AEON Bandaraya Melaka Shopping Centre in Jalan Lagenda, in Bachang, Malacca, kills a contractor and injures more than 20 others, six of whom are injured critically.
- 17 December – The Malaysian football team wins a gold medal after beating Vietnam 1–0 in the 2009 SEA Games football men's final in Vientiane, Laos, ending a 20-year gold drought.
- 18 December – Malaysia plans to bid for the 2006 Asian Games in Kuala Lumpur, after two failed attempts.
- 19 December – Two Royal Malaysian Air Force F-5E fighter jet engines worth 29 million dollars are stolen from a Sungai Besi Airbase, Kuala Lumpur, Malaysia.
- 24 December – The missing fighter jet engines are found in Argentina.
- 26 December – Ten passengers are killed and two are injured after a northboundu double-decker Sani Express bus skids and hits the road divider at Km 272.8 of the North–South Expressway, about 8 km from the Ipoh South toll plaza near Ipoh, Perak.
- 27 December – The Control of Tobacco Products Regulation (Amendment) (No.2) 2009, which sets the minimum price of cigarettes at RM6.40 for a 20-stick pack, is set by the Health Ministry to take effect on January 1, 2010.
- 28 December – The publisher of Herald – The Catholic Weekly files a writ of summons and statement of claim in the Kuala Lumpur Courts Complex to seek appropriate declarations of the use of the word "Allah".
- 31 December – The High Court declared that the Herald can use "Allah" in its Catholic weekly publication and that the Home Minister order banning its use was illegal, null and void.

== National Day ==
=== Theme ===
1 Malaysia: Rakyat Didahulukan, Pencapaian Diutamakan (1 Malaysia: People First, Performance Now)

=== National Day parade ===
Malaysian Houses of Parliament, Kuala Lumpur

== Births ==
- 9 September – Auddra Zulkifli – Singer
- 23 November – Keith Chan Hong Tao – Footballer
- 22 December – Yap Shing Xuen – Schoolgirl, Murder victim.

== Deaths ==
- 23 January – Kugan Ananthan – Royal Malaysia Police officers.
- 19 February – Ibrahim Hussein – artist.
- 21 May – Ismail Yaacob – Manek Urai, Kelantan's State Assemblyman.
- 25 July – Yasmin Ahmad – award-winning film director.
- 16 July – Teoh Beng Hock – Political secretary of Seri Kembangan state assemblyman Ean Yong Hian Wah.
- 13 August – Ustaz Asri (Rabbani) – Rabbani's nasyid vocalist leader.
- 17 September – Noordin Mohammad Top – Police raid.

== See also ==
- 2009
- 2008 in Malaysia | 2010 in Malaysia
- History of Malaysia
- List of Malaysian films of 2009
