= Medal for Noble Deeds =

The Medal for Noble Deeds may refer to:

- Medal for Noble Deeds (Denmark), established in 1793
- Medal for Noble Deeds (Sweden), established in 1832
