= Malaysian AIDS Council =

Malaysian organization

- Majlis AIDS Malaysia

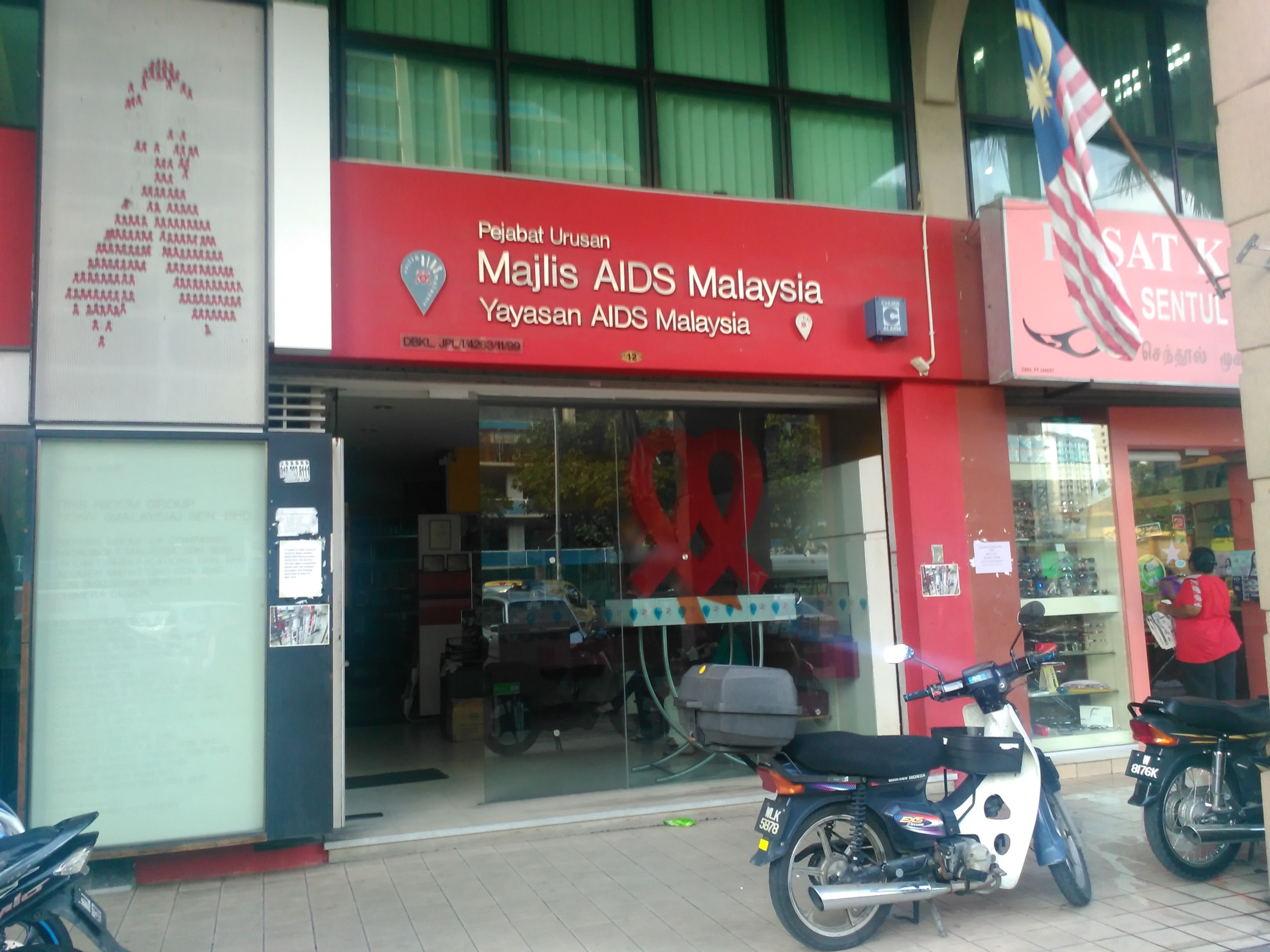
- The Malaysian AIDS Council office in Sentul, Kuala Lumpur
- Abbreviation: MAC
- Formation: 1992
- Founder: Ministry of Health
- Type: NGO
- Purpose: Serves as an umbrella organisation to support and coordinate the efforts of non-governmental organisations (NGOs) working on HIV and AIDS issues in Malaysia
- Headquarters: Kuala Lumpur
- Location: Malaysia
- Region served: Malaysia
- Services: Harm reduction; Prevention for key population; Prevention Strategies; Advocacy; Policy; Stakeholder relations
- President: Datuk Dr. Christopher Lee
- Vice President: vacant
- Honorary Secretary: Professor Madya Dr. Raja Iskandar Shah Raja Azwa
- Honorary Treasurer: Mohamad Shahrani bin Mohamad Tamrin
- Website: www.mac.org.my

Malaysian AIDS Council (Malay: Majlis AIDS Malaysia, abbrev: MAC) is a Malaysian organisation established in 1992 under the Ministry of Health (MOH) with a mission to represent, mobilise and strengthen non-governmental organisations and communities who were working with HIV/AIDS issues. The Malaysian AIDS Council began with an umbrella of 18 NGOs who were directly working on the various aspects of HIV/AIDS issues.

== Objectives ==
MAC complements and supports the government's efforts to maximise the community's response to HIV/AIDS and to maximise the usage of limited resources available. The primary objectives of MAC are to:

- Increase awareness of HIV/AIDS
- Prevent the spread of HIV
- Eliminate discrimination, stigma and prejudice associated with HIV/AIDS
- Promote and protect the rights of those made vulnerable to HIV/AIDS
- Ensure the highest possible quality of life for those with HIV/AIDS
- Provide care and support to individuals with HIV/AIDS

== Scope of work ==
MAC works with its partner organisations in a diverse range of activities from advocating and policy reforms; developing awareness and communication materials; creating public awareness campaigns; conducting and organising workshops and seminars; rolling out prevention and education programmes; providing care and support services and psychological counselling.

== Special projects ==
MAC also works on special projects, including Needle and Syringe Programme (NSEP) which strives to reduce the unsafe practice of sharing needles and syringes by infected injecting drug users (IDU).

== Malaysian AIDS Foundation ==
The Malaysian AIDS Foundation (MAF) raises money and manages funds to support the activities of the Malaysian AIDS Council and its partner organisations. Celebrities have lent their time and faces to generate monies for MAC, and large corporations, both international and local, including Standard Chartered Trust Fund, Mercedes-Benz Malaysia, Hong Leong Bank Bhd, L'Oreal Malaysia, Shell, and Levi Strauss Foundation.

== Partner organizations ==
MAC is led by an executive committee (EXCO) of ten elected representatives from the partner organisations which comprises a diverse range of associations, including the medical industry, religious based communities, and the nation's legal institutes. The partner organisations that make up MAC are:

- AIDS Action and Research Group (AARG)
- Association of Malaysian Medical Assistants
- Bar Council
- Boys' Brigade in Malaysia
- Buddhist Missionary Society Malaysia (BMSM)
- The Buddies of Ipoh
- Catholic Welfare Services (CWS)
- Community AIDS Service Penang (CASP)
- DiC Pahang
- The Estates Hospital Assistants Association, Peninsular Malaysia (EHAA)
- Federation of Reproductive Health Associations, Malaysia (FRHAM)
- Harapan Komuniti Sdn Berhad
- He Intends Victory (M) Berhad
- Intan Drop-in Society, Teluk Intan (PKI)
- Islamic Medical Association of Malaysia
- Kota Kinabalu AIDS Support Services Association (KASIH)
- Kuala Lumpur AIDS Support Services (KLASS)
- Malaysian CARE
- Malaysian Consultative Council of Buddhism, Christianity, Hinduism, Sikhism and Taoism (MCCBCHST)
- Malaysian Dental Association (MDA)
- Malaysian Hindu Youth Council (MHYC)
- Malaysian Indian Youth Council (MIYC)
- Malaysian Medical Association (MMA)
- Malaysian Red Crescent Society
- Malaysian Youth Council (MYC)
- National Council of Women's Organisations (NCWO)
- Natural Therapy Centre (NTC)
- Obstetrical and Gynaecological Society of Malaysia (O&G)
- Persatuan Insaf Murni Malaysia (PIMM)
- Persatuan Perantaraan Pesakit-Pesakit Kelantan (SAHABAT)
- Pertubuhan Kebajikan Intan Zon Kehidupan Johor Bahru
- Pertubuhan Masyarakat Prihatin (PRIHATIN)
- PT Foundation
- Sarawak AIDS Concern Society (SACS)
- Selangor and Federal Territory Federation of Reproductive Health Associations, Malaysia
- The Kuala Lumpur and Selangor Chinese Assembly Hall (KLSCAH)
- Shekinah Home Services Sdn Bhd
- Soroptimist International Club of Bangsar (SICB)
- St. John Ambulance of Malaysia
- Tenaganita Sdn Bhd (Tenaganita)
- Women's Aid Organisation
- Women & Health Association of Kuala Lumpur (WAKE)
- Youth With a Mission Malaysia (YWAM)

== See also ==
- HIV/AIDS in Malaysia
