= PT Foundation =

HIV/AIDS non-profit in Malaysia

- Yayasan PT

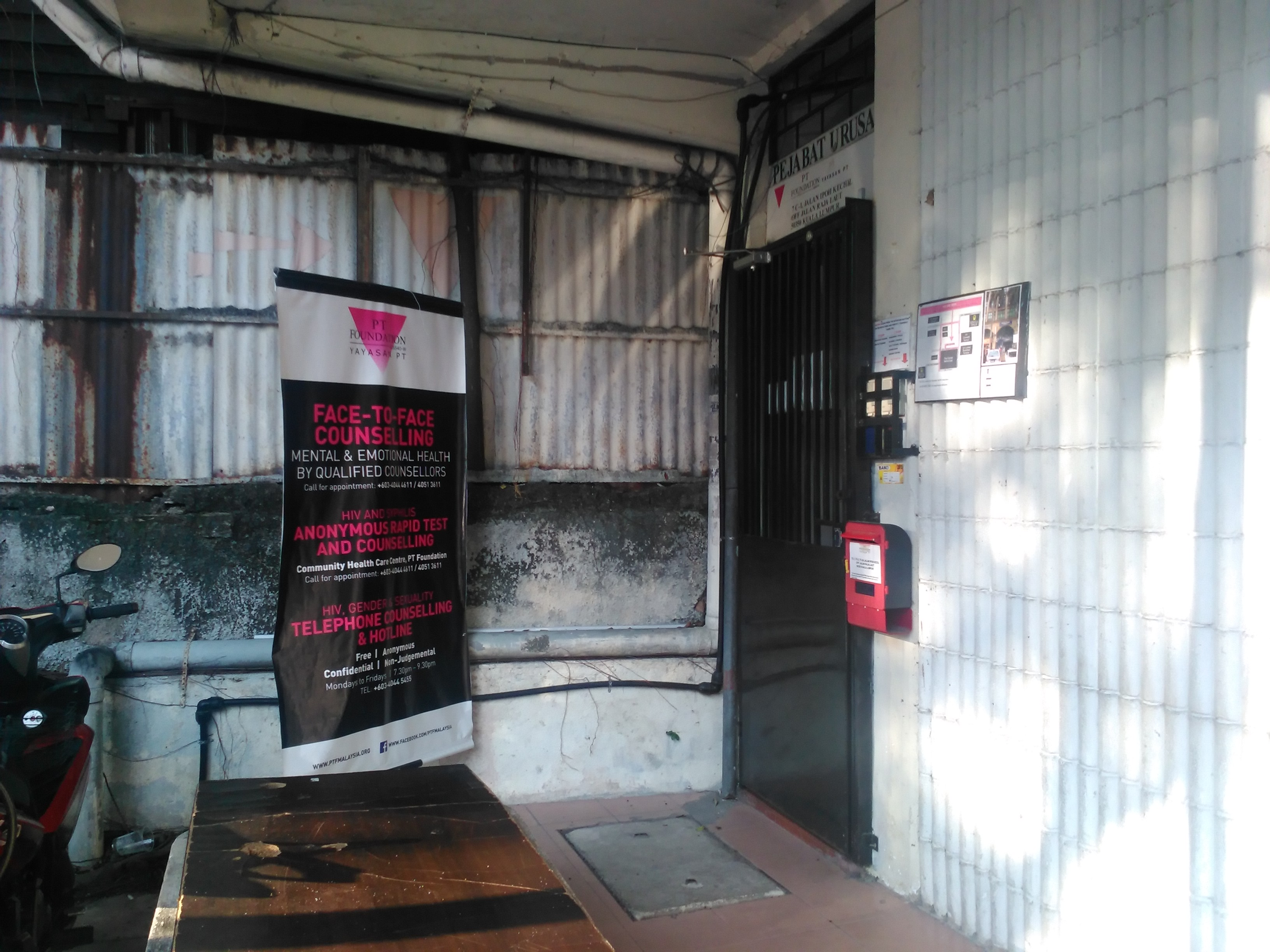
- PT Foundation office in Chow Kit, Kuala Lumpur.
- Formation: 1987
- Founded at: Kuala Lumpur, Malaysia
- Type: Nonprofit organization
- Legal status: Foundation
- Purpose: HIV/AIDS
- Headquarters: Kuala Lumpur
- Location(s): Jalan Ipoh Kecil; 50350 Kuala Lumpur
- Region served: Malaysia
- Trustee: Dato’ Rosie Tan
- Chairperson: Hisham Hussein
- Affiliations: AIDS Healthcare Foundation; Aidsmap; Berjaya Cares Foundation; CIMB Foundation; Fridae; Malaysian AIDS Council; Ministry of Health; SaleDuck; The Global Fund; ViiV Healthcare
- Staff: 40
- Website: ptfmalaysia.org/v2
- Formerly called: Pink Triangle Sdn Bhd

PT Foundation (Malay: Yayasan PT) is a community-based, voluntary non-profit making organization providing HIV/AIDS education, prevention, care and support programmes, sexual health and empowerment programmes for vulnerable communities in Malaysia. PT Foundation is the largest community-based HIV/AIDS organization in Malaysia and has benefited more than 100,000 people.

PT Foundation was also one of the seven founding members of the Malaysian AIDS Council (MAC).

== History ==
Pink Triangle Sdn Bhd was founded in 1987 to provide a telephone counseling service for HIV/AIDS and sexuality issues. It was founded to cater for gay men in Malaysia. The foundation started in a small room in an apartment on the 13th floor of City Tower in Jalan Alor, Kuala Lumpur before moving to Jalan Inai and finally to its current location at Jalan Ipoh Kecil. In 2000, PT Foundation was registered under the Register of Companies and took over the assets of Pink Triangle Sdn Bhd and was formally recognized as a Foundation in Malaysia. The foundation has evolved to provide support and care services to four other vulnerable communities: Maknyah (a Malay term for a male-to-female transgender people), commercial sex workers, drug users and people living with HIV.

PT Foundation is the first NGO in Malaysia to offer HIV/AIDS testing, counseling, prevention, support, referral and care services. Being a member of the MSM community and life partner of Hisham Hussein for more than 30 years, Raymond Tai, the chief operating officer of PT Foundation firmly believes that the battle to eliminate stigma and discrimination of HIV/AIDS involved a shift in how soon Malaysia could move from a conservative and judgemental society to one that embraced diversity, irrespective of one's race, religion and sexual orientation.

== Services ==
PT Foundation provides telephone and face-to-face counseling, anonymous HIV and STI screening, outreach programmes, and support for key affected populations mainly drug users, sex workers, transsexuals, men who have sex with men (MSM), and people living with HIV/AIDS (PLHIV).

=== Community Health Care Centre (CHCC) ===
CHCC is a centre located in Sentul, Kuala Lumpur. The centre is managed as a social enterprise, where beneficiaries of the programme e.g. the MSM community have to pay fees for HIV and other sexually transmitted diseases tests and counselling services. The centre is accredited as an Impact Driven Enterprise by the Finance Ministry.

== Awards and Accolades ==
Year	Category	Award	Programme	Results	Ref.
2006	Special Recognition	UNAIDS Red Ribbon Award	Transgender and Transsexuals Programme	Won	
2007	Malaysian Humanitarian Award	NST-PwC Award	Programme on sex workers	Nominated	
2008	Malaysian NGO of the Year Award by Resource Alliance International		PT Foundation	Won	
2008	The Dr Siti Hasmah Award by Malaysian AIDS Foundation		Most Significant Contribution to HIV/AIDS work in Malaysia	Won	
2018	Community Organization Award	APCOM Hero Award	For pioneering and internationally respected provider of care, support, education and advocacy for people affected by HIV in Malaysia.	Won	

== See also ==
- HIV/AIDS in Malaysia
- LGBT rights in Malaysia
