= 2009 swine flu pandemic in Malaysia =

| Total | Cases | Cases | Deaths |
| Total | Laboratory confirmed | Estimated | Confirmed (Suspected) |
|---|---|---|---|
| Malaysia | 2,253 (5,876) | 15,000+ | 78 |

| Total | Cases | Cases |
| Total | Imported transmissions | Local transmissions |
|---|---|---|
| Malaysia | 574 | 1,679 |

The 2009 swine flu pandemic in Malaysia was part of a global outbreak caused by a new strain of the influenza A virus subtype H1N1 (A/H1N1). The first confirmed case in Malaysia was reported on 15 May 2009, involving an imported case from the United States. Subsequent imported cases from countries such as Australia were detected, with the first case of local transmission identified on 17 June 2009.

As of 11 August 2009, Malaysia recorded over 2,253 cases, and by 21 August, the unofficial number of cases reported in the media had risen to 5,876. The first death related to the A/H1N1 virus occurred on 23 July 2009, and the total death toll reached 78 by early 2010.

In response to the growing number of cases, the Malaysian government declared a national health emergency and shifted its strategy from containment to mitigation on 6 July 2009. This approach aimed to minimize the impact of the virus by focusing on managing severe cases and slowing its spread within the community. The government also considered imposing strict measures, including a health curfew similar to the week-long shutdown implemented in Mexico during the pandemic's early stages. Schools, public gatherings, and workplaces were closely monitored, with temporary closures implemented in affected areas.

On 12 August 2009, the Malaysian Health Ministry ceased issuing daily updates on the total number of H1N1 cases in line with the guidelines of the World Health Organization, emphasizing the monitoring of severe cases rather than total case counts. By early 2010, while new cases were still being reported, the Malaysian government declared the situation under control, citing effective mitigation measures and the healthcare system's capacity to manage the outbreak. Health authorities continued monitoring for new cases to prevent a resurgence of the virus.

== Terminology ==
The flu virus was officially designated by the WHO as "Influenza A (H1N1)", following a name change from "swine flu" to avoid implying that eating pork products carried a risk of infection. This designation was also used by Malaysia's Health Minister. However, on 25 June, Information, Communications, and Culture Minister Rais Yatim suggested that the local media use "swine flu" (Malay: selsema babi) instead. He justified this by stating that the dangers of the flu would be better understood by the public and that the term would be easier to describe in Malay, a language officially used in news programs on government-owned television and radio channels.

== Transmission timeline ==
Malaysia reported no suspected cases of A(H1N1) before 4 May 2009. Between 4 and 15 May, several cases were tested, but all results came back negative. The 2009 FOBISSEA Primary Games in Kuala Lumpur were canceled after an unidentified student contracted the virus while at the airport. Teams from British International Schools throughout Southeast Asia were sent home and quarantined.

On 15 May, Malaysia reported its first case of A(H1N1) infection. The patient was a 21-year-old male student who had arrived at Kuala Lumpur International Airport (KLIA) on 13 May. He traveled on Malaysia Airlines flight MH091 from Newark, New Jersey, with a transit stop at Stockholm-Arlanda Airport. The second case was confirmed on 16 May, involving a female student who had been on the same flight as the first patient. She later boarded an AirAsia flight (AK5358) to Penang. Malaysia became the 36th country to detect A(H1N1) cases within its borders.

The first patient was hospitalized at Sungai Buloh Hospital, while house quarantines were implemented for two friends of the second patient and their family members. The Health Ministry urged all passengers of Malaysia Airlines flight (MH091) and AirAsia flight (AK5358) to contact the Ministry or health offices for preventive measures. Thermal scanners continued to be used at airports despite the first patient's symptoms not being detected.

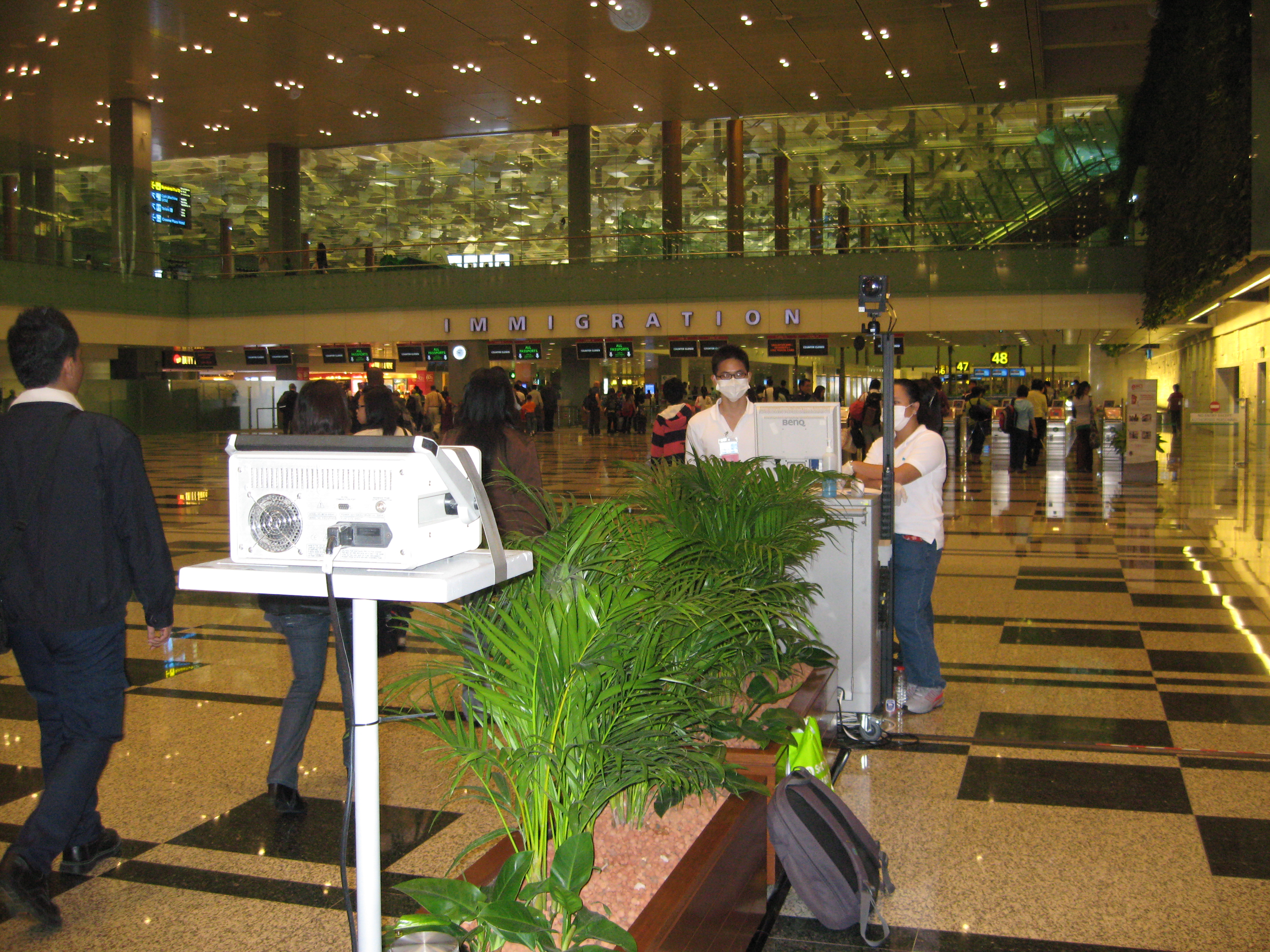
Thermal scanning for swine flu at Singapore Airport

On 4 June, three inbound airline passengers were confirmed to have the virus. The first was a 23-year-old student returning from the United States on 1 June via Malaysian Airlines flight (MH091). On the same day, two German tourists, traveling in Southeast Asia, tested positive after arriving in Malaysia. They had flown into the country on 3 June via an Air Asia flight (AK702) after transferring from a Singapore Airlines flight (SQ45) from Germany to Singapore on 1 June. All three patients showed symptoms on 3 June and were hospitalized. Passengers from their flights were traced for further action.

On 17 June, the first local transmission was confirmed, marking Malaysia's 19th case. By 20 June, Malaysia had recorded 42 cases, with the first school closure at SJK(C) Davidson after students contracted the virus locally.

By early July, 574 cases were confirmed, including 159 local transmissions. On 23 July, Malaysia reported its first H1N1-related death.

By August 2009, daily new cases exceeded 200, with a total of 2,253 cases by mid-month.

== Deaths ==
Reported death as of 15 October 2009

Since the confirmation of Malaysia's first A(H1N1)-related death on 23 July 2009, the virus claimed several lives, particularly among high-risk individuals. The first fatality was a 30-year-old Indonesian man with multiple medical conditions, including obesity and an enlarged heart. Health Minister Liow Tiong Lai clarified that A(H1N1) was not the direct cause of his death.

By early August, fatalities began to rise sharply. On 6 August, a 57-year-old diabetic pensioner with hypertension succumbed to the virus in Putrajaya. The following day, a 40-year-old obese man died at Kuala Lumpur Hospital after developing acute coronary syndrome and cardiogenic shock, making him the nation's 15th fatality. By 8 August, the death toll reached 18, including a 5-year-old boy who died of acute encephalitis secondary to H1N1, and a 1-year-old toddler who succumbed to pneumonia.

The following week saw a dramatic increase in fatalities, with eight deaths recorded on 9 August, raising the toll to 26. The victims included individuals with pre-existing conditions, such as asthma and obesity, as well as a 20-year-old college student who died unexpectedly at her hostel. A similar trend continued with six more deaths on 10 August, followed by another six the next day, pushing the total to 38.

By 12 August, the death toll had climbed to 44. This included a 60-year-old man with diabetes and hypertension, an 18-year-old pregnant woman, and a 1-year-old toddler with congenital heart disease. Each succumbed to complications such as severe pneumonia and organ failure.

The rising fatalities prompted public health measures and the administration of antiviral drugs such as Tamiflu. However, the virus continued to claim lives among both high-risk and seemingly healthy individuals. By the end of August, the death toll had risen to 72, with victims ranging from young children to elderly individuals with pre-existing medical conditions. By mid-September, the death toll had reached 77, including a 45-year-old woman with hypertension, a 15-year-old girl with a history of asthma, and a 19-year-old teenager who succumbed to severe pneumonia.

On 12 April 2010, Malaysia recorded another death from the virus, involving a 42-year-old male lawyer from Johor Bahru. This marked the country's 78th fatality since the outbreak began last year and the first death in 2010. The Malaysian government continued to emphasize public awareness, health screenings, and the importance of timely medical intervention to mitigate the outbreak's impact.

Outbreak evolution in Malaysia: Deaths Confirmed cases

== Government responses ==
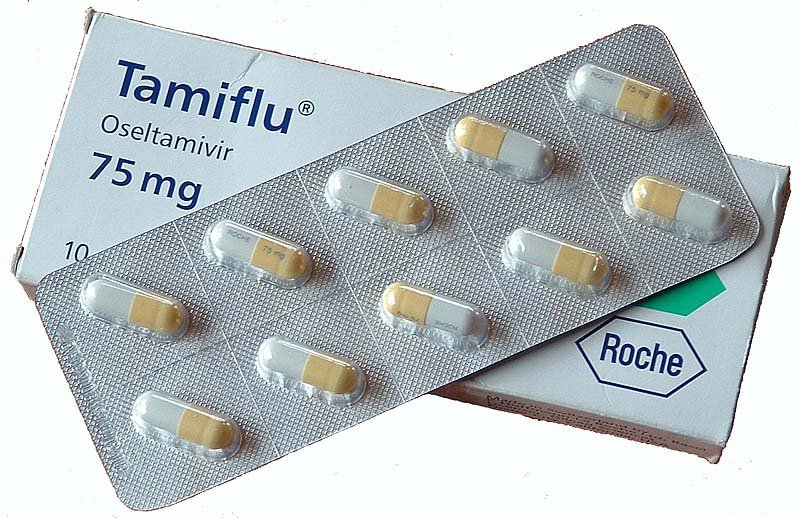
The Malaysian government stockpiled over 2 million doses of Tamiflu, an antiviral drug used to treat influenza, in anticipation of a potential outbreak.

Since the Nipah virus outbreak in 1999, the Malaysian Health Ministry has implemented measures to better protect the population from infectious disease threats. During the Severe Acute Respiratory Syndrome (SARS) outbreak and the H5N1 (bird flu) outbreak in 2004, Malaysia demonstrated its preparedness to handle such crises.

The Malaysian government developed the National Influenza Pandemic Preparedness Plan (NIPPP) as a structured guide for pandemic preparedness and response. This plan provided a policy and strategic framework for a multisectoral approach, offering specific guidance to the Ministry of Health at various levels, governmental agencies, and non-governmental organizations to ensure efficient resource utilization before, during, and after a pandemic.

Under the leadership of Liow Tiong Lai, the Malaysian Ministry of Health initiated health screenings at air, sea, and land entry points for passengers traveling to and from Mexico, starting on 17 April 2009. The Health Ministry's disease control division activated its operations room to monitor the swine flu situation. Medical practitioners were advised to report cases with influenza-like symptoms, severe pneumonia, or recent travel to Mexico, California, or Texas to the district health office for immediate preventive and control measures. As with several other Asian nations, thermal scanners were installed at entry points, including the Kuala Lumpur International Airport (KLIA), following the global alert on swine flu. Screenings were extended to Pengkalan Hulu at the Malaysia-Thailand border by late April. Additionally, quarantine rooms were allocated across 28 hospitals, and the government stockpiled over 2 million doses of Tamiflu by May 2009.

The Malaysian Health Ministry reminded citizens not to withhold health information, warning that violators could face penalties under the Disease Prevention Act 1988, including fines up to RM10,000, imprisonment for up to two years, or both. On 18 June 2009, Deputy Prime Minister Muhyiddin Yassin announced that all travelers, including Malaysians returning from abroad, would be required to complete health declaration forms due to the global influenza A(H1N1) pandemic.

=== Mitigation of the virus ===
On 17 August 2009, the government indicated that it would consider implementing a health curfew if the mortality rate for influenza A(H1N1) exceeded 0.4%, compared to the current rate of 0.1%-0.3%. Health Minister Liow Tiong Lai confirmed that the situation was being treated as a "health emergency".

=== Public health measures ===
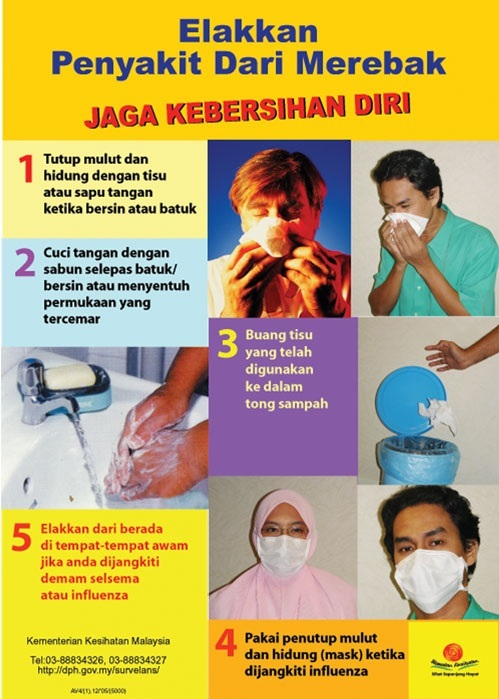
The Ministry of Health (MOH) poster urged the public to maintain hygiene by covering coughs, washing hands, wearing masks, and avoiding crowds to prevent disease spread during the 2009 swine flu pandemic in Malaysia.

Health Minister Liow Tiong Lai urged the public to wear masks if they exhibited flu symptoms, emphasizing its role in protecting others from infection. In addition to wearing masks, individuals were encouraged to practice good hygiene, such as washing hands regularly and avoiding crowded places when unwell.

=== Closure of educational institutions ===
In response to the country's first confirmed case of A(H1N1), the Malaysian Ministry of Health urged the public to remain calm, assuring that the situation was under control and that comprehensive precautionary measures had been implemented in accordance with the World Health Organization's level-five alert. On 16 May 2009, strict hygiene protocols were introduced in schools nationwide to minimize the risk of outbreaks among students and staff. As a preventive measure, several affected schools, universities, and PLKN training camps were temporarily closed for approximately one week to curb the spread of the virus.

=== Vaccination campaign ===
In response to the 2009 swine flu pandemic, Malaysia implemented a national vaccination campaign to curb the spread of the H1N1 influenza virus. The campaign was part of a comprehensive public health effort to protect vulnerable populations and mitigate the impact of the pandemic. Vaccinations were offered free of charge to healthcare workers, who were considered at higher risk due to their frontline roles in managing the crisis. By prioritizing this group, the government aimed to ensure the stability of the healthcare system during a time of heightened demand.

The H1N1 vaccine used in Malaysia was both safe and effective, with a safety profile similar to that of the seasonal flu vaccine. Additionally, the vaccine was available in a nasal mist form, which provided an alternative to traditional injections, making administration easier for certain groups. The vaccination program specifically targeted those most at risk, including young people who lacked immunity to the virus, as well as pregnant women, individuals with pre-existing medical conditions, and residents of institutional settings where the virus could spread rapidly. Older individuals were less affected as many already had some immunity from exposure to similar influenza strains in the past.

== See also ==
- 2009 flu pandemic by country
- 2009 flu pandemic timeline
- COVID-19 pandemic in Malaysia
