= 2010 Penang dragon boat tragedy =

Dragon boat accident in Penang, Malaysia

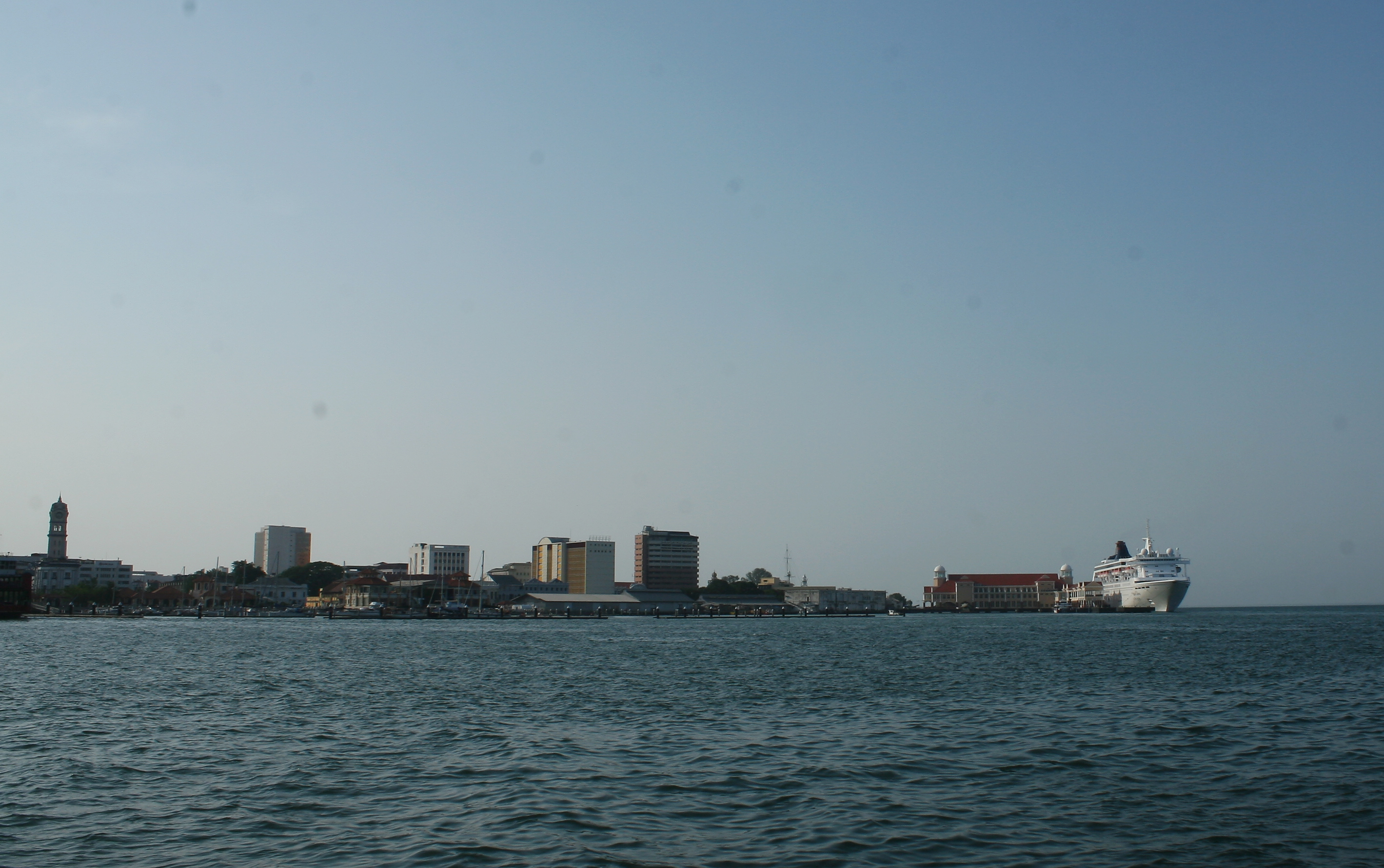
- Penang Strait, the location of the accident
- Native name: 钟灵中学龙舟队翻覆事件
- English name: Chung Ling High School dragon boat capsizing incident
- Date: 17 January 2010
- Time: 9:00 am (MST)
- Venue: Penang Strait
- Location: Georgetown, Penang, Malaysia; 5°24′28″N 100°20′46″E
- Type: Dragon boat capsizing
- Cause: Strong currents result in boat collision
- Budget: RM 84 million on rescue operation
- Participants: 15 students 2 instructors 1 teacher 100 person involved in rescue operation
- Deaths: 6
- Injuries: 12
- Burial: 19 January 2010
- Website: Official Facebook

2010 Penang dragon boat tragedy
- Simplified Chinese: 钟灵龙舟翻覆
- Traditional Chinese: 鐘靈龍舟翻覆
Transcriptions
Standard Mandarin
- Hanyu Pinyin: zhōng líng lóng zhōu fān fù

The 2010 Penang dragon boat tragedy (Chinese: 钟灵中学龙舟队翻覆事件) was an incident that occurred on 17 January 2010 in Penang, Malaysia. The incident involved the Chung Ling High School dragon boat club, where eighteen paddlers took part in dragon boat training at Penang Strait. Strong water currents caused the helmsman to lose control of the dragon boat and collide with a tugboat. The dragon boat then capsized and killed six of the eighteen paddlers, including a teacher and several students. A memorial service was held on the following day in the school. The school flag was flown at half-mast, and funerals were held on the second day following the incident. The school and government subsequently donated the money to the victims' families and survivors.

It was later revealed by the Penang Education Department that the school disregarded the safety guidelines for co-curricular activities by not seeking approval and clearance before conducting the training. The training was unscheduled as it occurred upon students' requests to a new teacher already interested in joining the training session. Only three of the eighteen paddlers wore life jackets, and despite the precautions, two of them died at the scene. All paddlers who wore life jackets were unable to swim. Some officials said that the incident location was unsuitable for the water sports due to busy traffic, uncertain weather conditions, strong currents, and debris left by fishermen from boat repair. Penang Forward Sports Club countered that the area was safe for a training session as a trained coach had checked the sea and weather conditions.

== History ==
On 17 January 2010, the Chung Ling High School dragon boat practice took place in Penang Strait, located off Macallum Street Ghaut, as part of their weekly training in preparation for their upcoming July competition. Eighteen paddlers took part in this activity. Safety measures were not followed, as only three of the eighteen paddlers wore the compulsory life jackets. While training, some rowers, mostly new members, were tired and paused in the middle of the sea. At approximately 9:00 am, the dragon boat capsized after colliding with a tugboat when strong currents caused the helmsman to lose control of the boat. Twelve paddlers were admitted to Penang General Hospital after being rescued by fishermen in two nearby boats or having swum to safety. A 100-person rescue team in sixteen boats consisting of policemen, firemen, marine law enforcement bureau and civil defense officers arrived at the accident area. Two bodies were retrieved: Chin Aik Siang, a teacher, at 11:00 am and Jason Ch'Ng, a student, at 2:50 pm. The remaining bodies, all students, were recovered the following day. Goh Yi Zhang was first discovered at 8:00 am, followed by Brendon Yeoh at 12:10 pm, and Wang Yong Xiang and Cheah Zi Jun, found at 4:25 pm. The search operation, totaling RM 84 million, ended at 5:00 pm.

On 18 January 2010, in memory of the deceased, the flag of Chung Ling High School was flown at half-mast and a memorial ceremony was held inside the school. The school Board of Governors, Parent-Teacher Association and Alumni Association donated RM 10,000 to the families of the victims. An additional RM 2,000 was donated to the injured paddlers. The principal of the school declared the incident to be "the darkest co-curricular activity incident ever occurs in the school’s history". The funerals for the deceased took place the following day at multiple victims' homes in Penang. Multiple high-profile figures, including Muhyiddin Yassin, Deputy Prime Minister of Malaysia, Lim Guan Eng, Chief Minister of Penang and Datuk Wira Ayub Yakoob, deputy communication for Penang police chief, visited the tragedy site. The Home Ministry then donated RM 3,000 to six of the deceased victims' families in addition to RM 1,000 from Education Ministry. An additional RM 200 from Education Ministry was donated to each survivor of this incident. The school offered psychological counseling to help victims and family members affected by psychological trauma as a result of the tragedy.

== Controversies ==
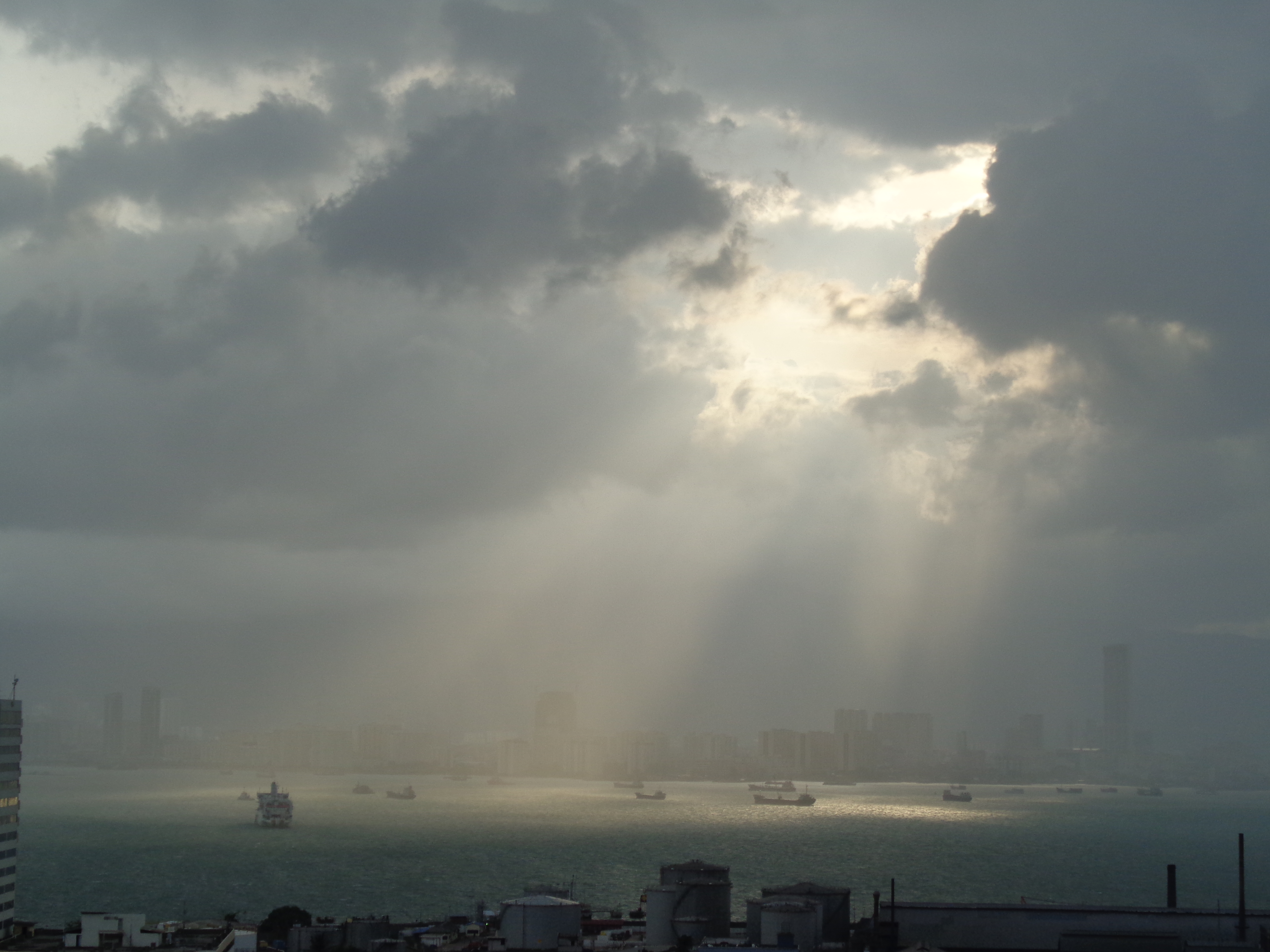
According to Shamsir Mohamed, officer of Marine Department (northern region), the Penang Strait was unsuitable for any water sports activity due to busy traffic, unpredictable weather, and strong currents.

There are several controversies that occurred before, during and after the incident. The school was found to have disregarded the safety guidelines for co-curricular activities set by Penang Education Department, which required school management to inform security authorities of the activities to ensure that students' safety could be ensured prior to extracurricular outdoor activities. The revelation also found out that the group did not seek approval or get clearance to conduct training session in this area. On 4 November 2010, Penang Forward Sports Club revealed to a parent of a deceased victim that the dragon boat training was unscheduled and conducted due to student requests to a new teacher already interested in joining the training session. Lok Yim Pheng, the secretary-general of the National Union of the Teaching Profession (NUTP), criticized the organizers, coordinators and teachers for developing a reputation of a lack of safety sense, citing another tragedy involving three women who drowned on a 1Malaysia school camping trip due to collapse of suspension bridge in Perak.

Most of the paddlers did not wear life jackets during most of the regular training as they knew how to swim, but three of the paddlers did wear them. Geh Thuan Tek, the secretary of Life Saving Society Malaysia Penang, who was also involved in the search and rescue mission, stated that life jackets would not guarantee that the wearer survive a drowning, especially if worn improperly. One of the victims is believed to have died after their unfastened life vest trapped them underneath the boat. Only one of the victims who wore a life vest survived. Not all of the students who attended the training were able to swim, as attested to by multiple family members.

Some officials, especially Shamsir Mohamed, officer of Marine Department (northern region) and Lai Chew Hock, chairman of Penang Dragon Boat Association, voiced concerns about the suitability of the area for water sports. Shamsir cited busy traffic, unpredictable weather, and strong currents for his concerns. Chew Hock claimed the area was unsuitable for any water sports activities due to debris from fishing boats and strong currents. Despite these concerns, the same area was used previously for Penang Pesta Open Dragon Boat Race in December 2009, which garnered criticism from residents of Penang. Concerns were raised when two boats collided during the race. As a result, organizers changed the location for the 2010 edition event to Teluk Bahang Dam. The decision was made following the Chung Ling dragon boat tragedy. The parent of a deceased victim questioned the rationale of conducting the training session during the north-east monsoon season and added that any water sports activity should only be conducted after monsoon season. Lim Choo Hooi, chairman of Penang Forward Sports Club, responded by saying that neither the wave tides nor the monsoon season posed a problem for training sessions. Coaches would need to check sea and weather conditions prior to conducting training sessions. He also said that the tragedy site was protected from tsunamis and strong waves and had been used for training for three years, making it one of the safest stretches of public shoreline.

== See also ==
- 2007 Tonlé Sap dragon boat accident
- 2011 Præstø Fjord dragon boat accident
