= HIV/AIDS in Malaysia =

The first known HIV/AIDS case in Malaysia was in 1986. Since then, HIV/AIDS has become one of Malaysia's most serious health and development challenges. In 2020, the Ministry of Health estimated that 87 per cent of an estimated 92,063 people living with HIV (PLHIV) in Malaysia were aware of their status, 58 per cent of reported PLHIV received antiretroviral therapy, and 85 per cent of those on antiretroviral treatment became virally suppressed. Despite making positive progress, Malaysia fell short of meeting the global 2020 HIV goals of 90-90-90, with a scorecard of 87-58-85.

In 2007, Malaysia ranked seventh highest in adult prevalence of HIV/AIDS in Asia, after Thailand, Papua New Guinea, Burma, Cambodia, Vietnam and Indonesia with a 0.45% prevalence rate. In 2016, Malaysia was one of the ten countries which together accounted for over 95% of all new HIV infections in the Asia-Pacific region.

In 2020, Malaysia recorded an incidence rate of 8.5 cases per 100,000 population, a 70 percent drop from 28.5 cases per 100,000 people in 2002.

== Prevalence ==
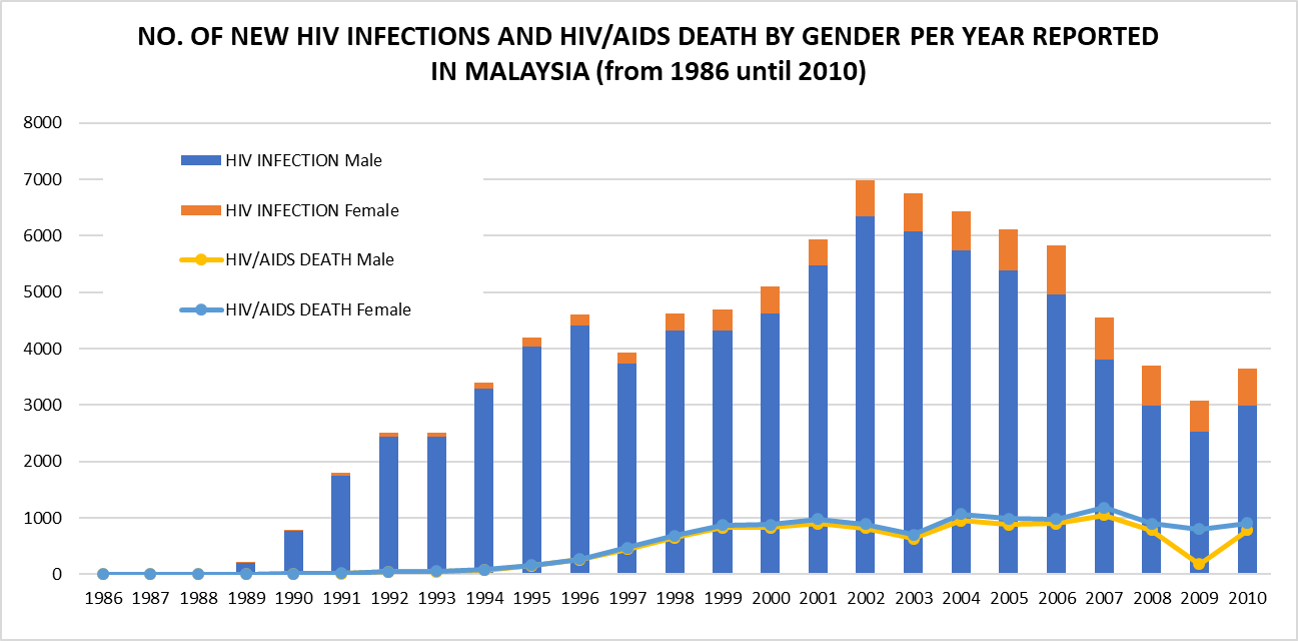
The number of new HIV infections and AIDS deaths for each year between 1986 and 2010, by gender

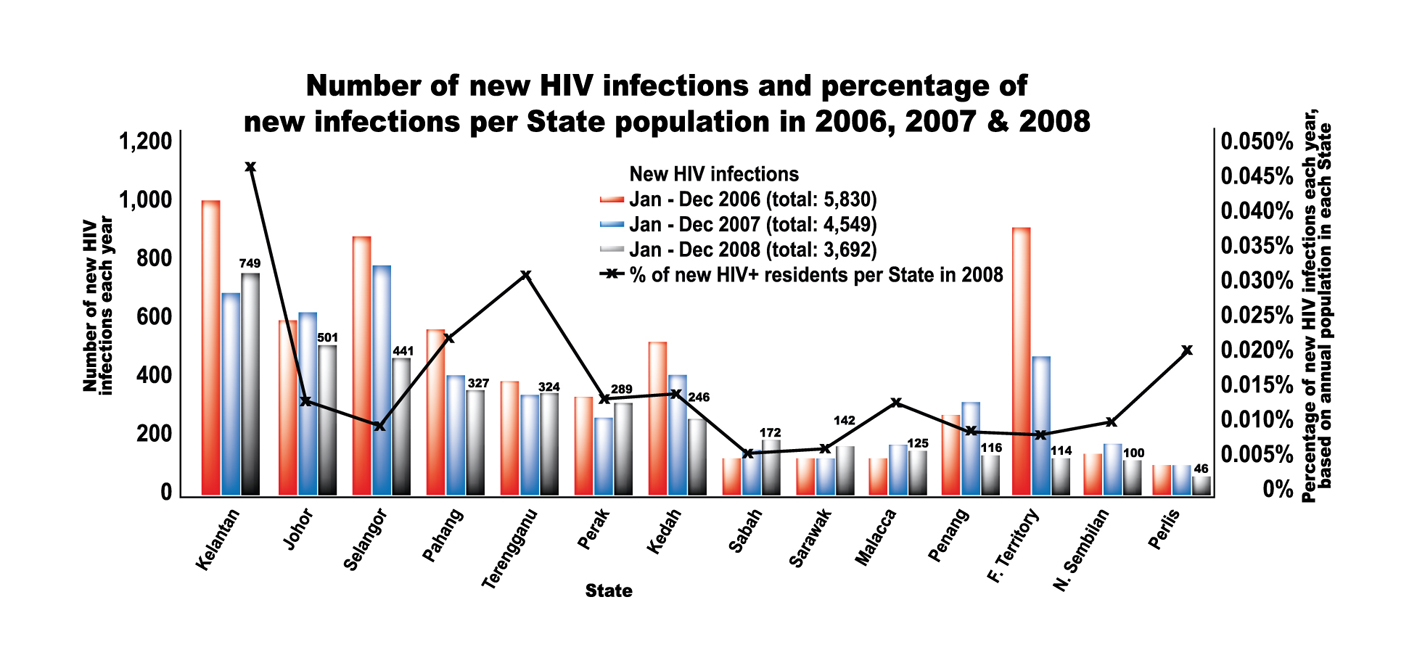
The number of new infections and percentage of new infections per State population in 2006, 2007 and 2008

Malaysian HIV/AIDS cases have been reported since 1986 by the Ministry of Health. In 2015, the national surveillance system reported a cumulative of 105,189 HIV cases, 21,384 AIDS cases, and 17,096 deaths related to HIV/AIDS.

Males make up the majority of HIV cases (89%). The number of women with positive status of HIV has been increasing. This is shown by the decreasing trend of male:female ratio of 10:1 in 2002 to 4:1 in 2014. 42% of HIV transmissions occurred in the 30–39 age bracket.

Between January and June 2014, there were 1,676 new cases of HIV and 598 cases of AIDS, with 402 deaths were recorded. Out of this new infection, 79.7% are men.

Reported New HIV Infections in Malaysia by Ethnic Groups (2016)
Percentage	%
Malay	57.5
Chinese	20.9
Indian	6.9
Foreigner	1.8
Others	12.9

=== Means of Transmission ===
In 2013, heterosexuals transmission recorded the highest (51%), followed by Injecting Drug User (22%) and Homo/Bisexual transmission (22%). In 2016, the means of transmission of new HIV cases were highest among Homo/Bisexual (46%), followed by Heterosexual (39%), Injecting Drug User (11%), Others (4%) and Mother-to-Child (1%).

In October 2018, Malaysia becomes the first country in the Western Pacific region to eliminate mother-to-child transmission of both HIV and syphilis, officially validated by the World Health Organization (WHO).

HIV transmission by risk factor in 2016
(% of 3,397 new infections)
1. Homosexual/Bisexual (46.0%)
2. Heterosexual (39.0%)
3. Injecting Drug User (PWID) (11.0%)
4. Others (4.00%)
5. Mother-to-Child (1.00%)
HIV transmission by age group in 2016
(% of 3,397 new infections)
1. 20–29 (40.0%)
2. 30–39 (31.0%)
3. 40–49 (16.0%)
4. > 50 (9.00%)
5. 13–19 (3.00%)
6. < 13 (1.00%)

=== Incidence & Mortality Rate ===
Incidence & Mortality Rate, 2016 (per 100,000 population)
Disease	Incidence Rate	Mortality Rate
HIV	10.73	0.53
AIDS	3.86	2.34

== At-risk group ==
The HIV epidemic in Malaysia is concentrated in key populations.

Sex workers

Sex workers accounts for 0.6% of total reported cases thus far. However, the number of cases reported among sex workers are grossly under reported. In 2014, Integrated Bio-Behavioral Surveillance (IBBS) in female sex workers shows an increase of sex workers living with HIV to 7.3% from 4.2% in 2012.

Transgender

In 2009, HIV prevalence rates amongst Transgender individuals was 9.3%. This decreased to 4.8% in 2012. In 2014, the HIV prevalence was 5.6%.

Injecting Drug Users

At the beginning of the epidemic, injecting drug user (PWID) accounted for 70–80% of all new reported cases. This has declined since 2004. In 2011, PWID accounted for 39% of new reported cases. In 2014, 16.3% of the PWID are reported living with HIV.

Men who have sex with men (MSM)

In 2012, 7.1% of MSMs were living with HIV. In 2014, the figure increased to 8.9%.

== Laws and regulations ==
In 2001, the Department of Occupational Safety and Health developed a non-compulsory ‘Code of Practice on Prevention and Management of HIV and AIDS' which supports the creation of a non-judgemental and non-discriminatory work environment.

During the 2011 Nineteenth ASEAN Summit, Malaysia together with other ASEAN nations, adopted the "ASEAN Declaration of Commitment: Getting To Zero New HIV Infections, Zero Discrimination, Zero AIDS-Related Deaths, Bali, Indonesia, 17 November 2011" to reaffirm their commitment in working towards realizing an ASEAN community with Zero HIV Infections, Zero Discrimination and Zero AIDS-related Deaths.

In October 2017, the then-Ministry of Human Resources Minister, Datuk Seri Dr Richard Riot Jaem announced that the government wants to draft a new regulation in an effort to eliminate discrimination against people living with HIV or AIDS at the workplace. The ministry plans to legislate the HIV and AIDS in Workplace Policy by 2020. In October 2018, it is reported that the Malaysian AIDS Council (MAC) is working with the Ministry of Human Resources on a policy to ensure that people with HIV/AIDS including those receiving treatment are not discriminated when it comes to employment.

=== Mandatory pre-marital HIV test ===
Mandatory pre-marital HIV screening for Muslim couples was made mandatory by the Religious Department of State Government in nine states, beginning in November 2001 in Johor, followed by Perak, Perlis, Kelantan, Terengganu, Kedah, Pahang, Selangor, and possibly Melaka. Beginning January 2009, Muslim couples in the entire country are required to submit to premarital HIV testing.

In 2018, the Ministry of Women, Family and Community Development considered making HIV testing mandatory for non-Muslim couples seeking marriage as well. The proposal is strongly opposed by NGOs such as the Malaysian AIDS Council and the Sarawak AIDS Concern Society (SACS), citing the stance of World Health Organization (WHO) and UNAIDS that do not support compulsory screening of individuals for HIV.

== Treatment ==
The first line of highly active antiretroviral therapy is provided for free in Malaysia by the Ministry of Health since 2006. By the end of 2020, 58 per cent of reported PLHIV received antiretroviral therapy, and 85 per cent of those on antiretroviral treatment became virally suppressed.

In September 2018, "HIV Connect", a self–paced, online learning platform that is designed for primary care physicians and other healthcare practitioners in Malaysia was launched. The online learning platform is a joint effort between the Malaysian AIDS Foundation (MAF) and the Malaysian Society for HIV Medicine (MASHM) to educate doctors regarding care and management of HIV/AIDS patients.

== Local support ==
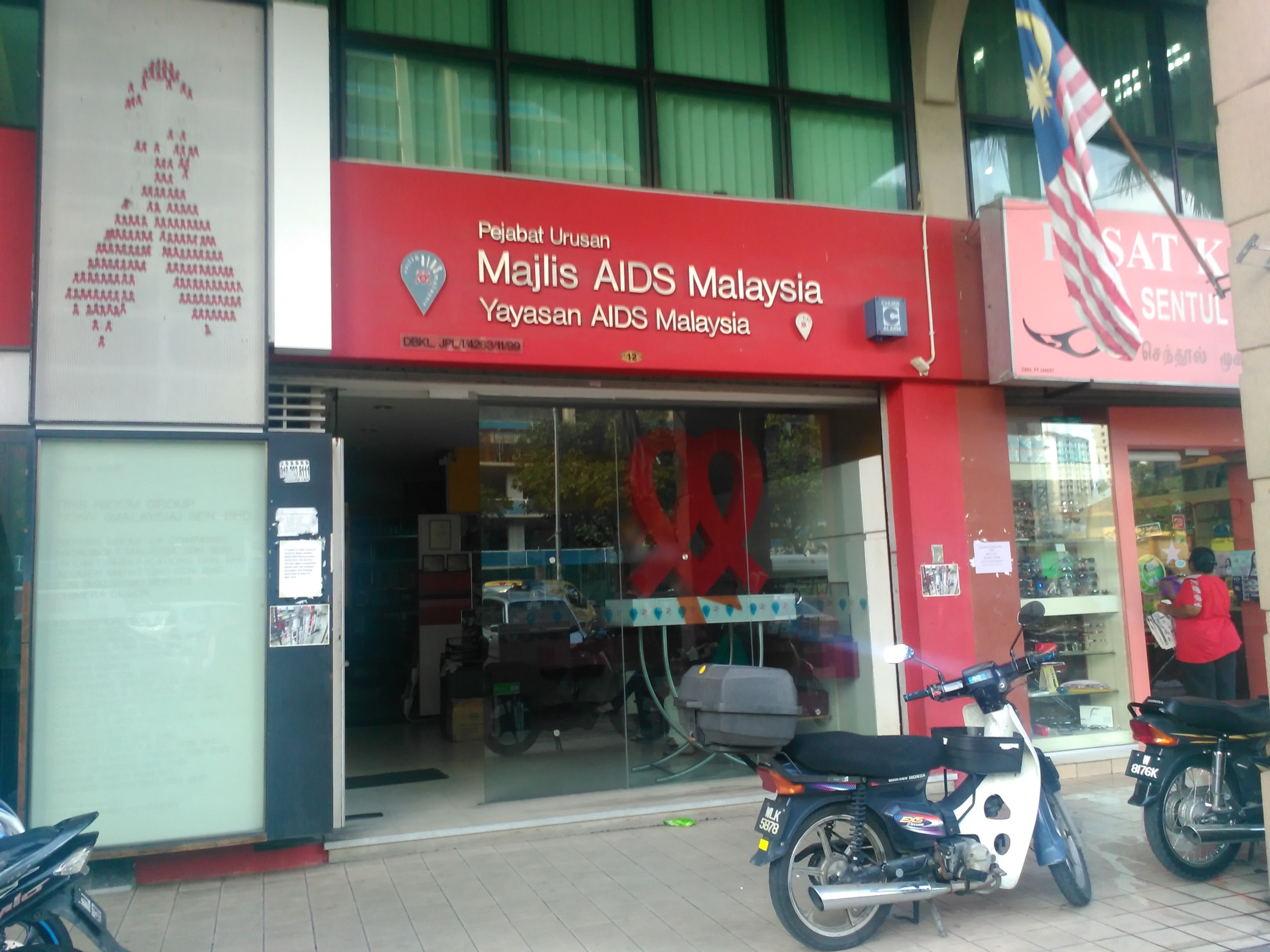
The Malaysian AIDS Council

- Malaysian AIDS Council (MAC) is a Malaysian non-profit organisation with a mission to represent, mobilise and strengthen non-governmental organisations and communities who were working with HIV/AIDS issues.
- PT Foundation (formerly known as Pink Triangle) is a community-based organisation "providing HIV/AIDS education, prevention, care and support programs, sexuality awareness and empowerment programs for vulnerable communities in Malaysia". The communities include MSM (men who have sex with men), transgender, sex workers, drug users, and people living with HIV.
- Kuala Lumpur AIDS Support Services Society (KLASS)
- APCASO – Asia Pacific Council of AIDS Service Organizations
- Tenaganita is a human rights organisation dedicated in assisting, building, advocating and protecting migrants, refugees, women and children from exploitation, abuse, discrimination, slavery and human trafficking.
- Persatuan Pengasih Malaysia (PENGASIH)
- Community AIDS Service Penang (CASP)
- Federation of Reproductive Health Associations, Malaysia (FRHAM)
- Islamic Medical Association of Malaysia (PPIM)
- Sarawak AIDS Concern Society (SACS)
- Women and Health Association of Kuala Lumpur (WAKE)
- Persatuan Perantaraan Pesakit-Pesakit Kelantan (SAHABAT)
- Pertubuhan Advokasi Masyarakat Terpinggir, a non-governmental organisation for marginalised communities.

== External sources ==
- Data Hub Satellite Page of Malaysia – a joint web platform between UNAIDS and the Ministry of Health of Malaysia.
- National Strategic Plan for Ending AIDS 2016–2030
