= 2011 Præstø Fjord dragon boat accident =

Dragon boat accident in Præstø Fjord, Denmark

Coordinates: 55°08′N 12°02′E

- Date: February 11, 2011
- Time: 11:22 (CET)
- Duration: 6 hours, 36 minutes
- Location: Præstø Fjord, Præstø, Denmark
- Type: Dragon boat capsizing
- Cause: Capsize due to wind
- Organised by: Lundby Efterskole
- Deaths: 1
- Injuries: 14

The 2011 Præstø Fjord dragon boat accident occurred on February 11, 2011, north of Præstø, Denmark. The incident involved 13 students and two teachers from Lundby Efterskole - a local continuation high school. The boat capsized due to the wind. This incident killed one of the teachers and injured most of the students, leaving several of them in permanent care. The body of the teacher, who was not wearing a lifejacket, was found over seven weeks later on April 3.

== History by timeline ==
=== February 11, 2011 ===
At 11:00 the students sailed out from the harbor of Præstø in their dragon boat to break a record set by other students two days before. At 11:22 the boat capsized. Because no one on board had a phone or a radio, the students had to swim ashore to alert the authorities. One student ran the 2.1 km back to Præstø town and placed the first emergency call at 12:42 prompting a large scale rescue mission. Several of the students were found unconscious in the water and seven were determined to be clinically dead. The thirteen students and one teacher were transported by ambulance or helicopter to six different hospitals on Zealand, six were admitted to Rigshospitalet. At 15:34 the boat was located and its surroundings checked. At 17:58 the rescue mission was called off with the other teacher still missing.

The seven critical cases had body temperatures in the range 15.5–20.2 °C (59.9–68.4 °F) and were treated with extracorporeal membrane oxygenation, the other survivors had hypothermia with core body temperatures as low as 23 °C. Subsequent neurorehabilitation evaluated via Functional Independence Measure was good in all but one survivor. Among the critical cases, six suffered mild to moderate cognitive dysfunction and one severe dysfunction.

=== 2012 ===
The management of the school was charged with manslaughter in the death of the teacher. A trial started January 2012. Based on previous trials involving incidents at similar boarding schools, the school risked being fined. During the trial it was revealed that the students felt pressured to participate in risky activities because those who refused were punished.

On February 1, 2013, the court in Nykøbing Falster ruled that the school would be fined 25 fines of DKK 25,000. The headmaster of the school was sentenced to 60 days in prison, suspended. He was also banned from teaching any activities on water for three years

=== 2015 ===
On September 25, 2015, the Medal for Noble Deeds was awarded to four of the students for their deeds at the accident.

== Popular culture ==
On December 3, 2019, BBC Story premiered a documentary Life after Death: How seven kids came back from the dead, which interviewed all seven survivors.

== See also ==
- 2007 Tonlé Sap dragon boat accident
- 2010 Penang dragon boat tragedy
