= National Organ, Tissue and Cell Transplantation Policy in Malaysia =

2007 Malaysian health policy

The National Organ, Tissue and Cell Transplantation Policy is a policy that was formulated by the Surgical and Emergency Services Unit of the Medical Services Development Section, Medical Development Division of the Malaysian Ministry of Health in June 2007.

The National Transplant Resource Centre (NTRC) was established by the Ministry of Health together with the support and cooperation from the Medical Development Division. Its main objective is to spread correct information and increase awareness on organ donation and transplantation in Malaysia. It is also responsible for getting more people to pledge and at the same time act as the registrar for organ, tissue and cells donation in Malaysia. The NTRC also collaborate with various NGOs, religious bodies, students’ association, corporate bodies as well as the media to spread information on organ donation and transplantation to the public.

== See also ==
- National Transplant Resource Centre, Malaysia
