= 2009 Perak suspension bridge collapse =

Bridge collapse in Malaysia

Coordinates: 4.311012°N 101.151872°E

Bridge Suspension River collapse
- Date: 26 October 2009
- Time: 10:30 night MYT
- Location: Kampar River, Kampar, Perak
- Deaths: 3

The 2009 Perak suspension bridge collapse took place on 26 October 2009. About 22 schoolchildren plunged into the Kampar River when a suspension bridge they were crossing collapsed on Monday night in Kuala Dipang near Kampar, Perak. Three children died and 19 were rescued.

== Background and incident ==
The suspension bridge with a length of approximately 50 metres (55 yards) was built two weeks ago to replace an older one that had collapsed, bridging the Kampar River in Kuala Dipang, Perak. From 64 primary schools in Kampar, Tronoh, and Batu Gajah, 298 students were attending a pre-teen school field trip organized by the Kinta Selatan education district. Part of the field trip, 22 children, on their way to supper to Kuala Dipang, were crossing the bridge until late at night at 22:30 MYT (14:30 UTC), according to a student, the bridge suddenly shook and "all of a sudden, we found ourselves thrown into the river." Twenty other people on the bridge managed to avoid falling into the river by holding onto the structure. According to Perak State Chief Minister Zambry Abdul Kadir, the bridge's support beams fell, leading to the collapse.

== Aftermath and investigation ==
In the early morning, local men in undershirts dove repeatedly into the Kampar River. Alongside residents, dozens of police and other authorities assisted in rescue operations. By morning, 19 children had been rescued while the body of a girl, Dina Deve, was recovered at 08:40 MYT (00:40 UTC), the first discovered fatality. Two children were still missing by then. Authorities were investigating if the bridge was built considering specifications.

== See also ==
- 2010 Penang dragon boat tragedy
