= Medal for Noble Deeds (Denmark) =

Medal for Noble Deeds Medaljen for Ædel Dåd
- Type: Award medal
- Country: Denmark
- Presented by: Frederik X
- Post-nominals: M.f.æ.D.
- Established: 12 June 1793
- Final award: 25 September 2015
- Ribbon bar of the medal
- Related: Medal for Saving Life from Drowning

The Medal for Noble Deeds (Danish: Medaljen for Ædel Dåd) is a Danish medal awarded to recognize the saving of a life at great risk to the rescuer and the rescued.

== History ==
The Medal for Noble Deeds was established 12 June 1793 by King Christian VII at the suggestion of the Finance Collegium. It is currently administered by the Ministry of Justice. The Medal is rarely awarded, and in 2011 there were 8 living recipients. On September 25, 2015, the Medal was awarded to three women and a man for heroic deeds at the Præstø Fjord accident on February 11, 2011.
