= Sungai Buloh Hospital =

Hospital in Sungai Buloh, Selangor, Malaysia

Sungai Buloh Hospital Hospital Sungai Buloh
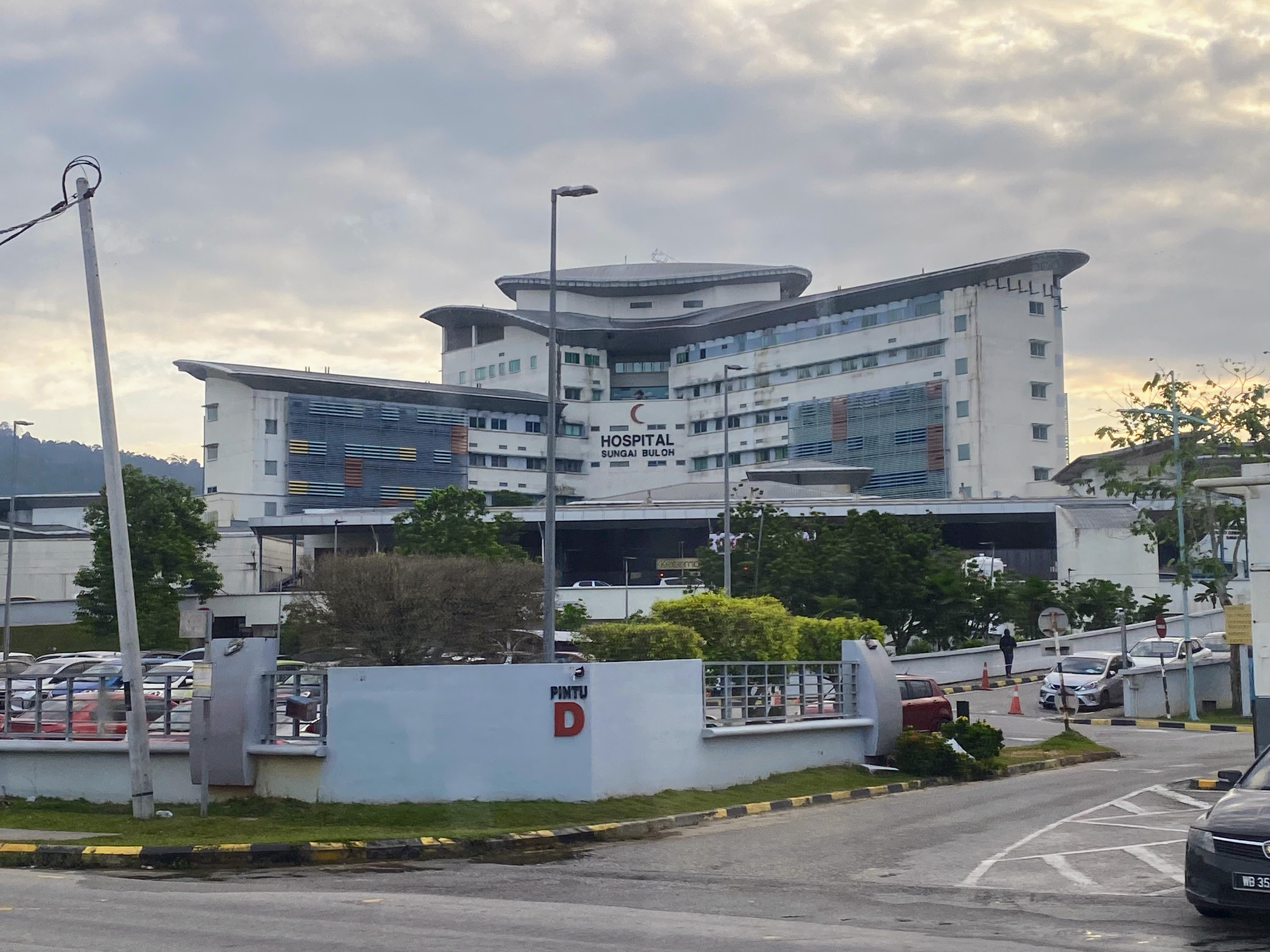
- Sungai Buloh Hospital main block seen from Gate D.

- Location within Selangor

Geography
- Location: Jalan Hospital; 47000, Sungai Buloh, Selangor, Malaysia
- Coordinates: 3°13′11″N 101°35′58″E

Organisation
- Care system: Public
- Type: District General, Teaching
- Affiliated university: Management and Science University; Universiti Teknologi MARA; Taylor's University

Services
- Emergency department: Yes
- Beds: 620

History
- Founded: September 2006; 20 years ago

Links
- Website: hsgbuloh.moh.gov.my

Sungai Buloh Hospital (HSB; Malay: Hospital Sungai Buloh) is a secondary and tertiary services rural general hospital located in Sungai Buloh, Petaling District, Selangor, Malaysia. The hospital covers an area of 130 acres. The main complex of the hospital with approximately 141,000 square feet (13,100 m^{2}) of gross built-up. The hospital serves the districts of Gombak, Petaling and Kuala Selangor with a combined population of more than 2.80 million.

== Background ==
HSB was developed in 1999 and has been initiated to meet the needs of the growing population and also to reduce the influx of patients at Hospital Kuala Lumpur.

The hospital was built by contractor, Tunas Selatan Sdn Bhd and costs RM 1.3 billion.

== Awards and achievements ==
| Year | Nominee / work | Award | Result |
|---|---|---|---|
| 2002 | Ward 54 for "outstanding work in the area of care and treatment of people living with HIV/AIDS in Malaysia". | UN Malaysia Person / Organisation of the Year Award | Won |
| 2020 | The COVID-19 team for its "unwavering efforts to fight the pandemic". | Global Health Awards | Won |
| 2022 | Outstanding Medical Excellence Award | Malaysia Top Achievers Awards | Won |

== Gallery ==
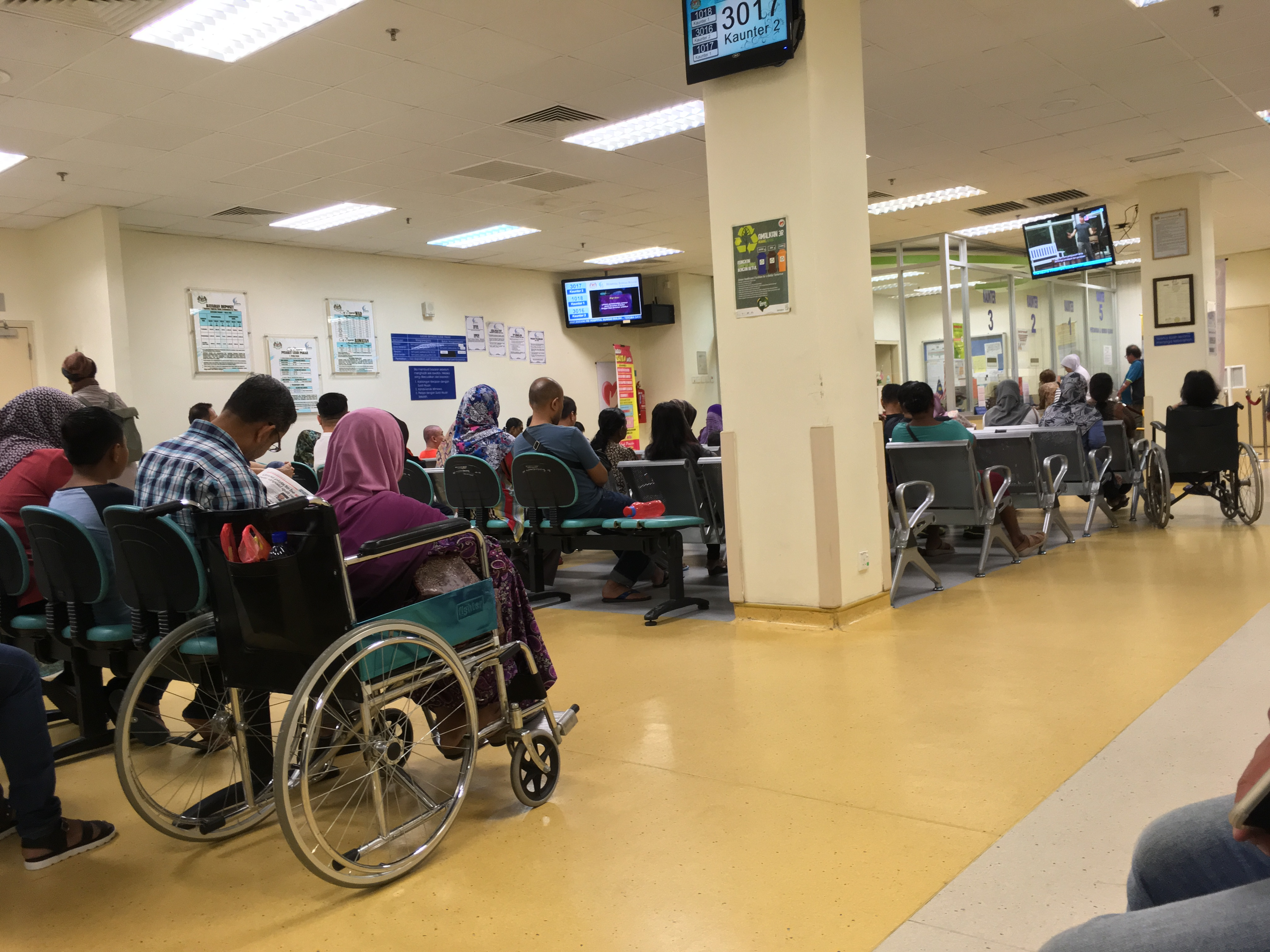
The lobby of one of specialist clinics in Sungai Buloh Hospital.

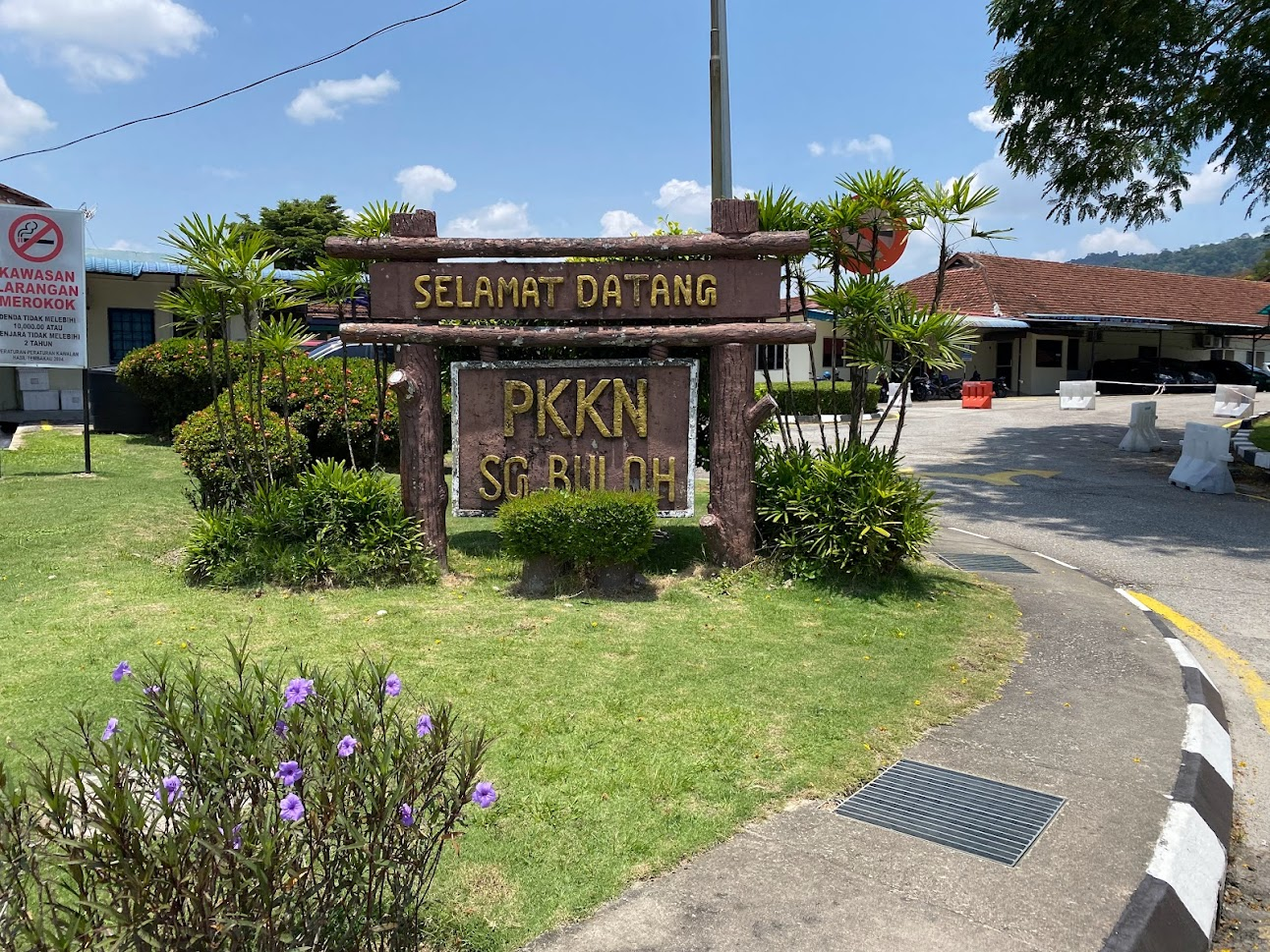
The western part of National Leprosy Control Centre (Pusat Kawalan Kusta Negara - PKKN) was placed under Hospital Sungai Buloh management since September 2006.
