= Youth Engagement Summit =

Asia Youth Summit

The Youth Engagement Summit (YES) is the gathering of Southeast Asian youths with well-known global icons of change. The 2009 Youth Engagement Summit took place on November 16–17 at the Putrajaya International Convention Centre in Kuala Lumpur, Malaysia.

The Summit’s goals are to create a lasting community of youths in the Southeast Asian region who are willing and able to work to bring positive changes to their lives and their communities. Attendees include regional and global business leaders as well as political figures and youths from all over Southeast Asia. 500 of the youth attendees were winners chosen out of the one million participants in the SEAchange survey. These winners were given free transportation, accommodations and tickets to the event. In addition to bringing the youth community together, the Summit saw the release of results from the SEAchange survey, which was presented to the UN and global NGOs and demonstrated what change Southeast Asian youth would like to help accomplish.

== Sponsors ==
YES2009 was funded by:

- Sledgehammer Communications
- The London Speaker Bureau
- YouthAsia
- Amphibia Digital
- GO Communications
- Photolibrary
- Global Communicators
- CaptiVate
- Eyeblaster
- CGYnet
- Zesqa Media
- Vocanic

== Participating countries ==
Youths participating in the Summit came from the following countries:

- Brunei
- Cambodia
- Indonesia
- Laos
- Malaysia
- Myanmar
- Philippines
- Singapore
- Thailand
- Vietnam

== Speakers ==
The following speakers presented at YES2009:

- Bob Geldof, founder of Live Aid and Live 8
- Biz Stone, inventor of Twitter
- Randi Zuckerberg, Director of market development at Facebook
- Amitabh Bachchan, Bollywood star and host of Kaun Banega Crorepati
- Dr. Mamphela Ramphele, former managing director of the World Bank
- Tony Fernandes, entrepreneur and founder of AirAsia
- Nando Parrado, survivor of the 1972 airplane crash of Uruguayan Air Force Flight 571
- Garry Kasparov, Chess Grandmaster and political activist
- Lorraine Hahn, CNN and CNBC anchor
