= Kuala Dipang =

Kampong in Perak, Malaysia

Coordinates: 4°22′36″N 101°09′40″E

Kuala Dipang is a kampong (English: village) near Kampar in Perak, Malaysia. Kuala Dipang is also one of the places that are extraordinary sometimes, such as having the trails for the hikers to begin their hiking, and bunch of more things to do in the places of Kuala Dipang.

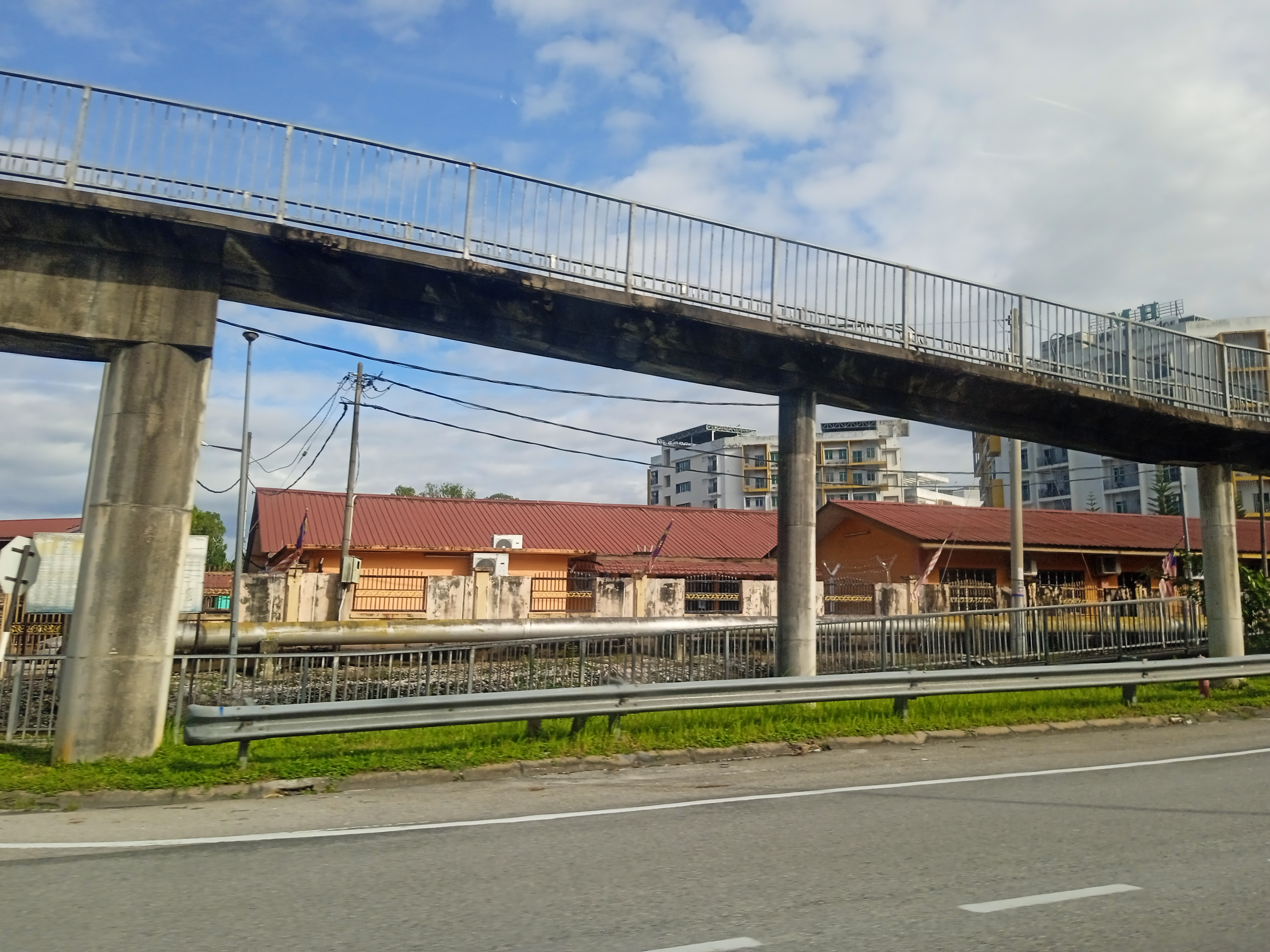
SMK (Sekolah Menengah Kebangsaan) Jalan Kuala Dipang. (Note: English: National High School Road of Kuala Dipang)

== History ==
=== Japanese occupation of Malaya in Perak and is Memorial ===
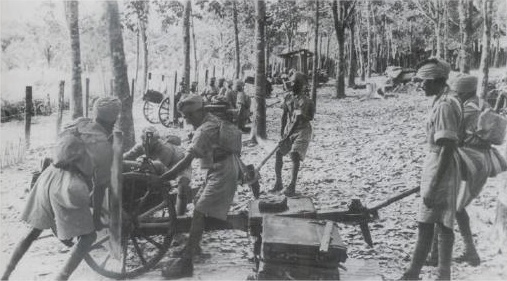
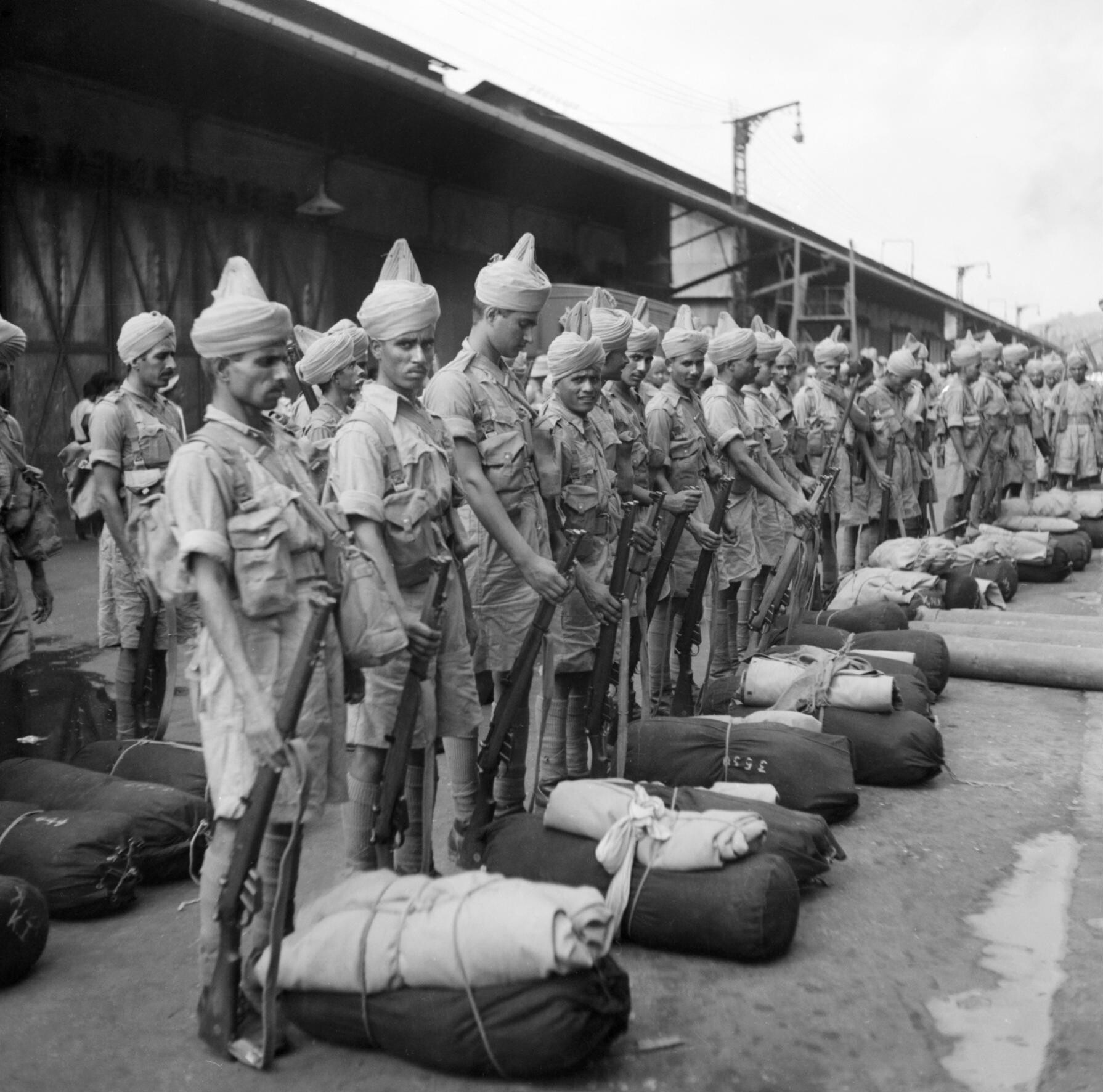
Sikh infantry served alongside as Indian army for the British troops (left) and a newly arrival of Indian troops in Singapore (right)

This kampong was also known for having such of the memorials that happened from the previous times during World War 2; whenever the Japanese is invading throughout the parts of Malaysia ruled by Britain (Note: Britain presence on Malaysia happened when britain bringing the impact into Malay Peninsula, and it led to severals occurrence of some instances which began for Malays to prevent the British impact, but it failed in elseway.) from that time during Malayan campaign, the Bridge was detonate by the Japanese soldiers. During that time, a battle occurred in Slim River in 1942 at Perak, which known as it title as Battle of Slim River—from around that time in the midst of the war, Battle of Kampar was a prelude battle against to Japanese imperial forces, which them bringing the impact to the location of Kampar around in Perak, and certainly as well as it is a prior to the Battle of Slim River. The exact conclusion were merely to told if determined to be a sudden victory to Allies, even though the Japanese tactical had won overall. The lack of reserves of the Malay Command of the 11th Division were forced to Slim River.

=== Incident in 2009 ===
Another of the events which occurred in the year of 2009, a sudden bridge in Kuala Dipang at Jeram had perhaps fully collapsed to being disintegrated, and it drowned about 3 pupils and 2 were missing during the bridge suspension collapse in 2009. Students of SK Kuala Dipang had participated of a Program Perkhemahan Satu Malaysia (English: Program Camping One Malaysia)—and they were about more than 269 students that had participated during the program of SK Kuala Dipang.
