= Ministry of Health (Malaysia) =

Government ministry of Malaysia

Ministry of Health (MOH)
- Kementerian Kesihatan Malaysia (KKM) كمنترين كصيحتن
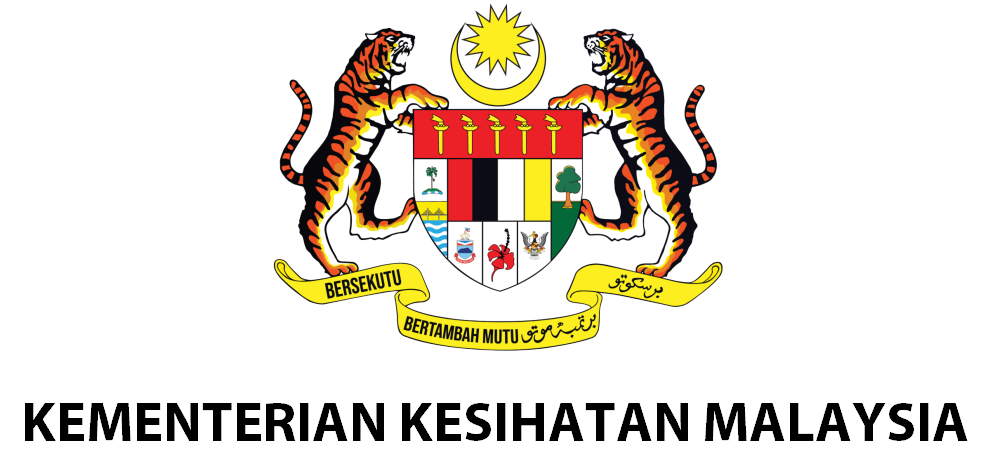

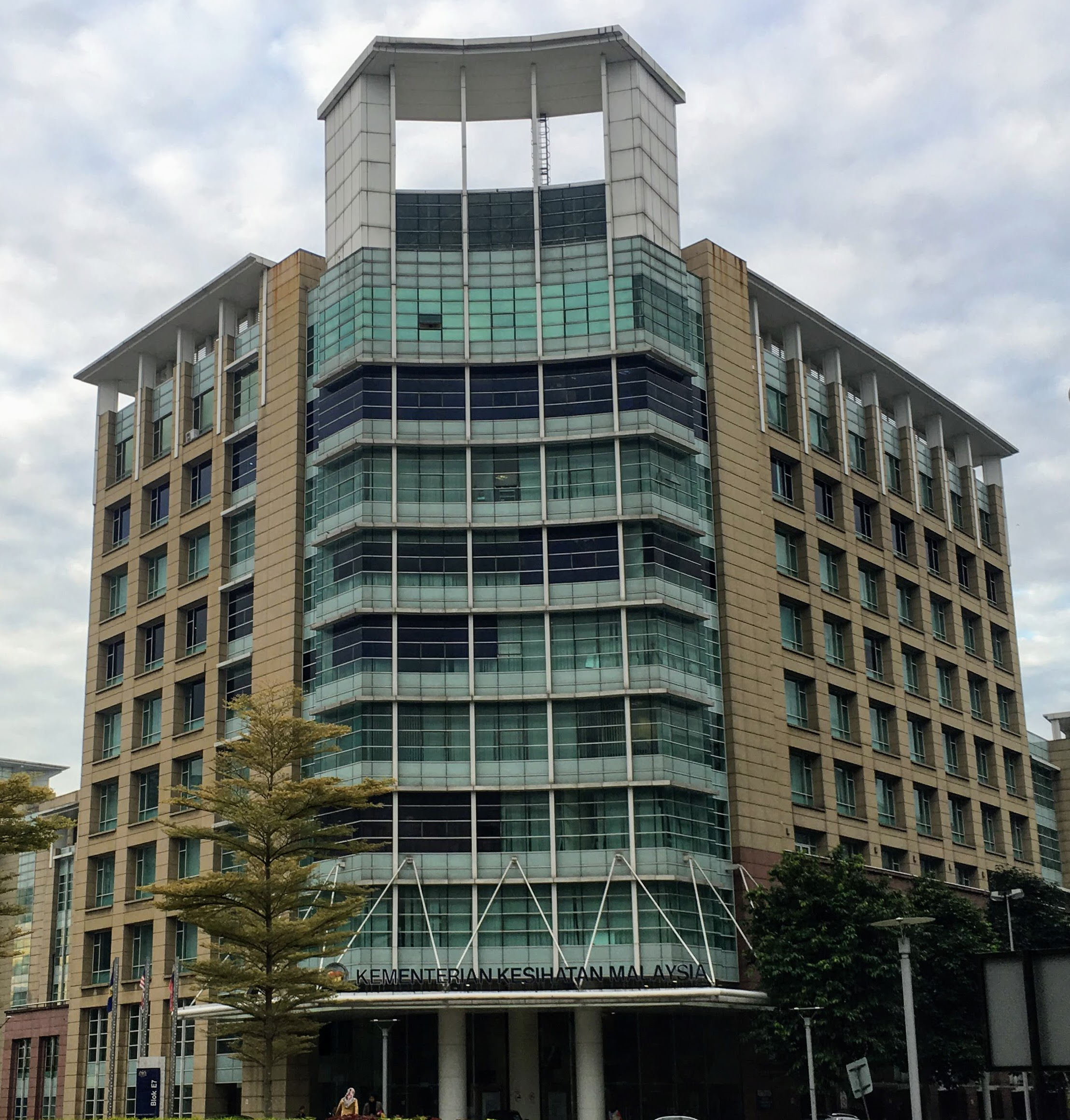
- The headquarters of Ministry of Health Malaysia in Kompleks E, Putrajaya

Ministry overview
- Formed: 1963; 63 years ago
- Preceding Ministry: Ministry of Health and Social Welfare
- Jurisdiction: Government of Malaysia
- Headquarters: Block E1, E3, E6, E7 & E10, Complex E, Federal Government Administrative Centre, 62590 Putrajaya
- Motto: We're Ready to Help (Kami Sedia Membantu)
- Employees: 267,578 (2020)
- Annual budget: MYR 46,520,215,600 (2026)
- Minister responsible: Datuk Seri Dr Dzulkefly bin Ahmad, Minister of Health
- Deputy Ministers responsible: Dato Hanifah Hajar Taib, Deputy Minister of Health; Datuk Seri Hasnol Zam Zam bin Ahmad, Secretary-General
- Ministry executives: Datuk Dr. Mahathar bin Abd Wahab Secretary-General, Secretary-General; Datuk Azah Hanim binti Ahmad, Deputy Secretary-General (Management); Dato' Sri Zahrul Hakim bin Abdullah, Deputy Secretary-General (Finance); Dato' Indera Dr Nor Azimi binti Yunus, Deputy Director-General (Medicine); Dr Ismuni bin Bohari, Deputy Director-General (Public Health); Datuk Dr Nor Fariza binti Ngah, Deputy Director-General (Research & Technical Support); Dr Fauziah binti Ahmad, Deputy Director-General (Dental); Dr Azuana binti Ramli, Deputy Director-General (Pharmaceutical Service); Ts Zailina binti Abdul Majid, Deputy Director-General (Security & Food Quality)
- Website: www.moh.gov.my

Footnotes
- Ministry of Health on Facebook

The Ministry of Health (Malay: Kementerian Kesihatan; abbreviated MOH (KKM in Malay); Jawi: كمنترين كصيحتن) is a ministry of the Government of Malaysia that is responsible for health system: health behaviour, cancer, public health, health management, medical research, health systems research, respiratory medicine, health promotion, healthcare tourism, medical device, blood collection, leprosy control, clinical research, health care, dental care, health institution, laboratory, pharmaceutical, patient safety.

The Minister of Health administers ministerial functions through the Ministry of Health and a range of other government agencies. The current Health Minister is Dzulkefly Ahmad who has served since 12 December 2023 and from 21 May 2018 to 24 February 2020. The minister is assisted by the Deputy Minister of Health Lukanisman Awang Sauni who took office on 10 December 2022.

Its headquarters is located in Putrajaya.

== Organisation ==
- Minister of Health
  - Deputy Minister
    - Secretary-General
      - Under the Authority of Secretary-General
        - Development Division
        - Policy and International Relations Division
        - Legal Advisor Office
        - Internal Audit
        - Corporate Communication Unit
        - Integrity Unit
        - Key Performance Indicator and Empowerment of Bumiputera Economy Unit
        - Policy Surveillance Unit
      - Director-General of Health
        - Under the Authority of Director-General of Health
          - Johor State Health Department
          - Kedah State Health Department
          - Kelantan State Health Department
          - Kuala Lumpur and Putrajaya Federal Territory Health Department
          - Labuan Federal Territory Health Department
          - Malacca State Health Department
          - Negeri Sembilan State Health Department
          - Pahang State Health Department
          - Penang State Health Department
          - Perak State Health Department
          - Perlis State Health Department
          - Sabah State Health Department
          - Sarawak State Health Department
          - Selangor State Health Department
          - Terengganu State Health Department
        - Deputy Director-General (Public Health)
          - Family Health Development Division
          - Disease Control Division
          - Health Education Division
          - Nutrition Division
          - Public Health Development Division
        - Deputy Director-General (Medical)
          - Medical Development Division
          - Medical Practice Division
          - Allied Health Sciences Division
          - Traditional and Complementary Medicine Division
          - Nursing Division
        - Deputy Director-General (Research and Technical Support)
          - Planning Division
          - National Institute of Health (NIH)
            - Institute for Medical Research (IMR), or Institut Penyelidikan Perubatan. (Official site)
            - Institute for Public Health, or Institut Kesihatan Umum (IKU). (Official site)
            - Institute for Health Systems Research (IHSR), or Institut Penyelidikan Sistem Kesihatan. (Official site)
            - Clinical Research Centre (CRC), or Pusat Penyelidikan Klinikal. (Official site)
            - Institute for Health Management (IHM), or Institut Pengurusan Kesihatan. (Official site)
            - Institute of Health Behavioural Research, or Insititut Penyelidikan Tingkahlaku Kesihatan (IPTK). (Official site)
          - Engineering Services Division
          - Medical Radiation Surveillance Division
        - Principal Director (Oral Health)
          - Oral Health Policy and Strategic Planning Division
          - Oral Healthcare Division
          - Oral Health Practice and Development Division
          - Malaysian Dental Council
        - Principal Director (Pharmaceutical Services)
          - Pharmacy Enforcement Division
          - Pharmacy Practice and Development Division
          - Pharmacy Policy and Strategic Planning Division
          - Pharmacy Board Malaysia
          - National Pharmaceutical Regulatory Agency
        - Principal Director (Food Safety and Quality)
          - Planning, Policy Development and Codex Standard Division
          - Compliance and Industrial Development Division
          - Food Analyst Council
      - Deputy Secretary-General (Management)
        - Human Resources Division
        - Training Management Division
        - Competency Development Division
        - Information Management Division
        - Management Services Division
      - Deputy Secretary-General (Finance)
        - Finance Division
        - Procurement and Privatisation Division
        - Account Division

=== Federal agencies ===
1. Children's Dental Centre and Dental Training College Malaysia, or Pusat Pergigian Kanak-Kanak dan Kolej Latihan Pergigian Malaysia (PPKKKLPM). (Official site)
2. Malaysian Health Promotion Board, or Lembaga Promosi Kesihatan Malaysia (MySihat). (Official site)
3. Medical Device Authority, or Pihak Berkuasa Peranti Perubatan (PBPP). (Official site)
4. Malaysia Healthcare Travel Council (MHTC), or Majlis Pengembaraan Penjagaan Kesihatan Malaysia. (Official site)

== Key legislation ==
The Ministry of Health is responsible for administration of several key Acts:

- Nurses Act 1950 [Act 14]
- Medical Act 1971 [Act 50]
- Dental Act 1971 [Act 51]
- Human Tissues Act 1974 [Act 130]
- Destruction of Disease-Bearing Insects Act 1975 [Act 154]
- Medical Assistants (Registration) Act 1977 [Act 180]
- Fees Act 1951 [Act 209]
- Dangerous Drugs Act 1952 [Act 234]
- Hydrogen Cyanide (Fumigation) Act 1953 [Act 260]
- Food Act 1983 [Act 281]
- Medicines (Advertisement and Sale) Act 1956 [Act 290]
- Atomic Energy Licensing Act 1984 [Act 304]
- Prevention and Control of Infectious Diseases Act 1988 [Act 342]
- Poisons Act 1952 [Act 366]
- Sale of Drugs Act 1952 [Act 368]
- Registration of Pharmacists Act 1951 [Act 371]
- Estate Hospital Assistants (Registration) Act 1965 [Act 435]
- Midwives Act 1966 [Act 436]
- Optical Act 1991 [Act 469]
- Telemedicine Act 1997 [Act 564]
- Private Healthcare Facilities and Services Act 1998 [Act 586]
- Mental Health Act 2001 [Act 615]
- Malaysian Health Promotion Board Act 2006 [Act 651]

== Policy priorities ==
- Emergency Medicine and Trauma Services Policy
- Psychiatric and Mental Health Services Operational Policy
- Unrelated Living Organ Donation : Policy and Procedures
- Standards of Sleep Facility in Ministry of Health, Malaysia
- Cardiothoracic Surgery Services Operational Policy
- Departmental Policy of Pathology Services
- Palliative Care Operational Policy
- Nephrology Services Operational Policy
- Operational Policy in Obstetrics and Gynaecology Services
- Policies and Procedures on Infection Control
- Operational Policy, Anaesthesia and Intensive Care Service
- Policy on Resuscitation Training for Ministry of Health Hospitals
- Cochlear Implant Service Operational Policy
- National Organ, Tissue and Cell Transplantation Policy
- Malaysian National Medicines Policy

== Ministers ==
Minister	Portrait	Office	Executive Experience
Dzulkefly Ahmad		Minister of Health	MP for Kuala Selangor (March 2008 – May 2013; May 2018 – current); Minister of Health (May 2018 – February 2020; December 2023 – current)
Hanifah Hajar Taib		Deputy Minister of Health	MP for Mukah (May 2018 – current); Deputy Minister in the Prime Minister's Department (March 2020 – November 2022); Deputy Minister of Economy (December 2022 – current)

== See also ==
- Minister of Health (Malaysia)
- National Organ, Tissue and Cell Transplantation Policy in Malaysia
