= 2008 in Malaysia =

- Decades: 1980s; 1990s; 2000s; 2010s; 2020s
- See also: Other events of 2008; History of Malaysia • Timeline • Years

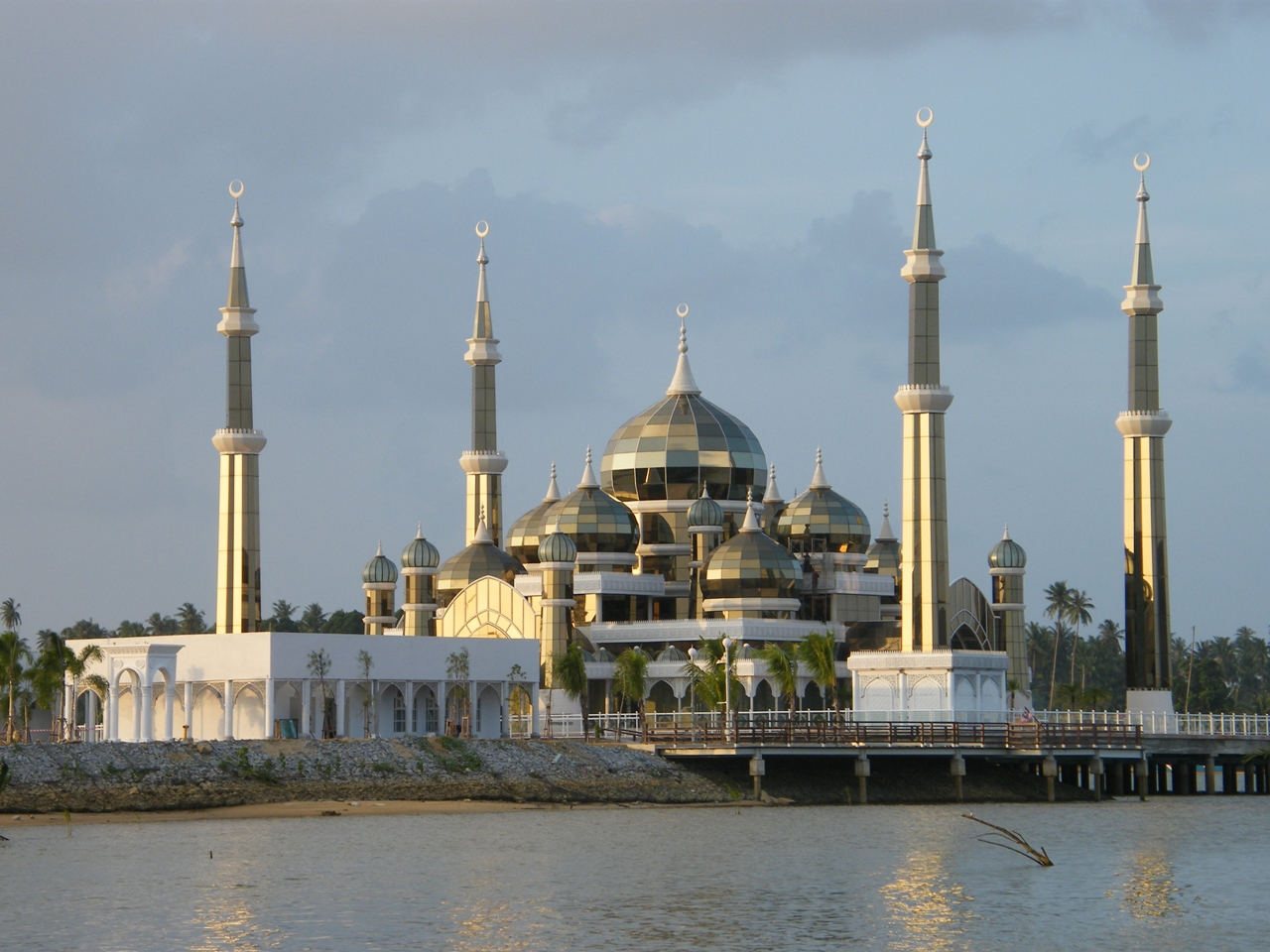
The Crystal Mosque at the Islamic Heritage Park (Taman Tamadun Islam), Kuala Terengganu, Terengganu, Malaysia.

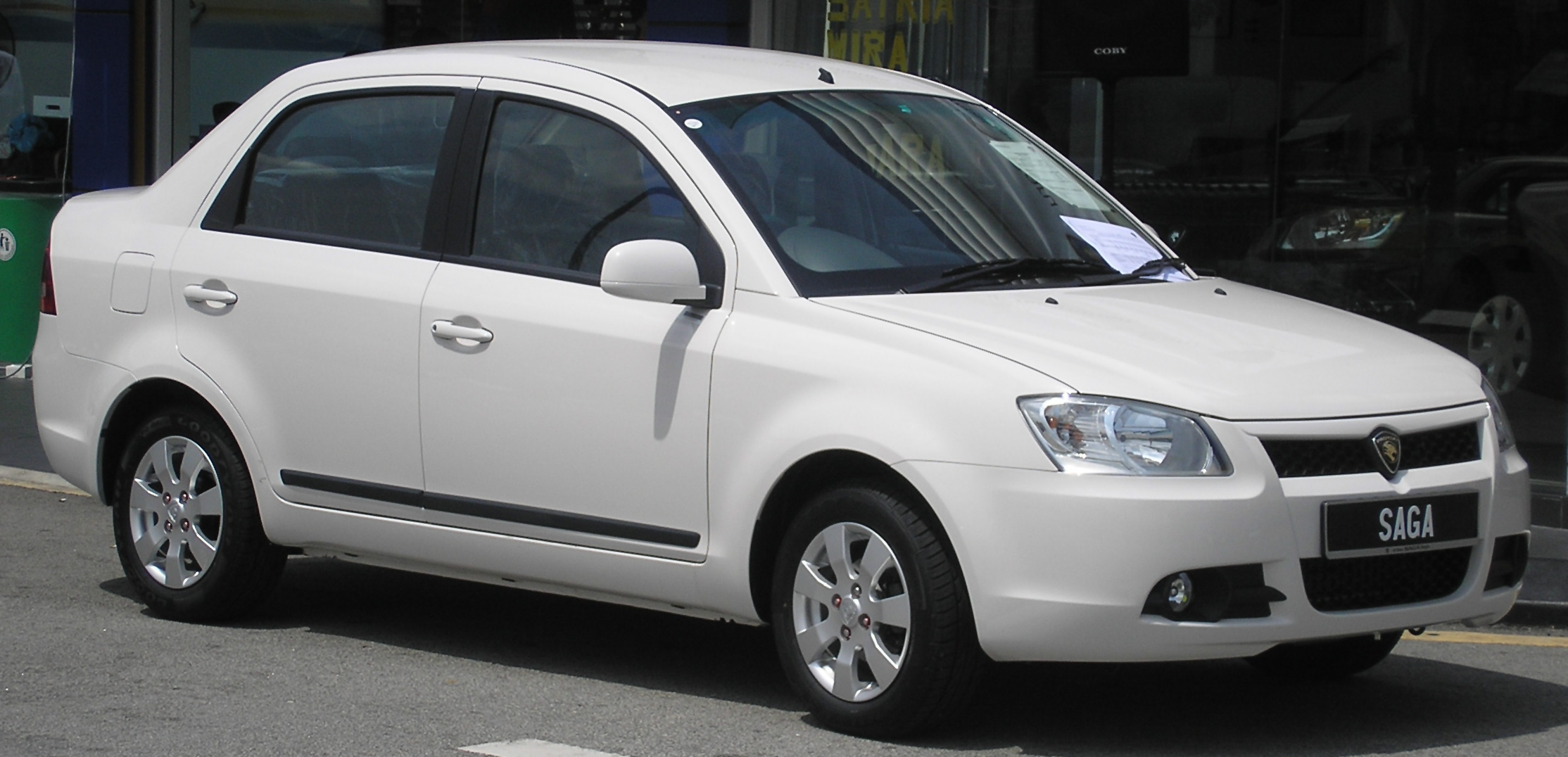
The second generation of Proton Saga.

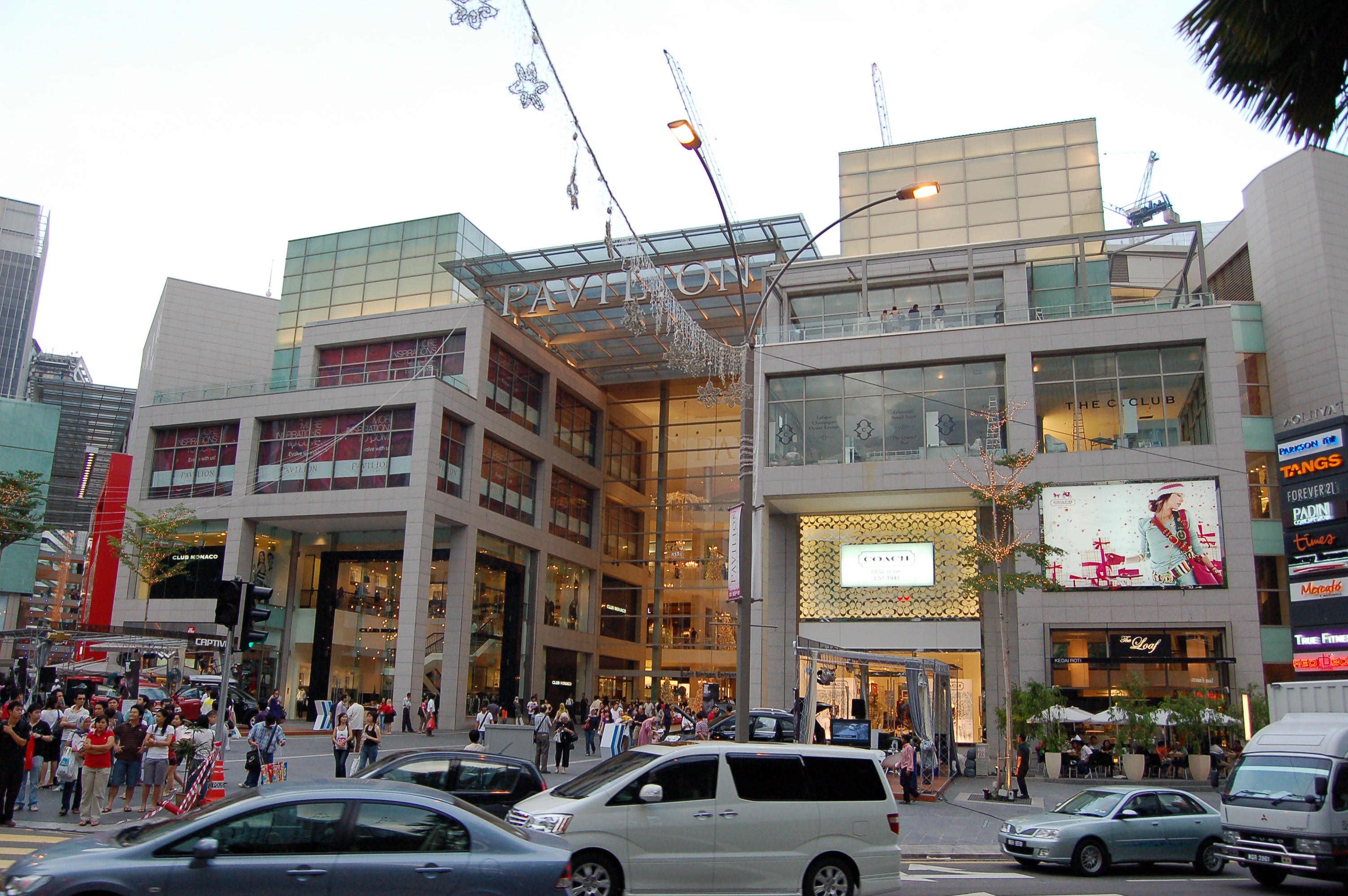
The Pavilion Kuala Lumpur shopping complex in Kuala Lumpur, Malaysia.

This article lists important figures and events in Malaysian public affairs during the year 2008, together with the deaths of notable Malaysians. 2008 marked is 51st anniversary of Malaysia's Independence.

== Incumbent political figures ==
=== Federal level ===
- Yang di-Pertuan Agong: Sultan Mizan Zainal Abidin of Terengganu
- Raja Permaisuri Agong: Sultanah Nur Zahirah of Terengganu
- Deputy Yang di-Pertuan Agong: Sultan Abdul Halim Mu'adzam Shah of Kedah
- Prime Minister: Tun Abdullah Ahmad Badawi
- Deputy Prime Minister: Dato' Sri Mohammad Najib Abdul Razak
- President of the Dewan Negara: Tan Sri Dato' Seri Dr. Abdul Hamid Pawanteh
- Speaker of the Dewan Rakyat:
  - Tan Sri Dato' Seri Diraja Ramli Ngah Talib (until 27 April)
  - Tan Sri Datuk Seri Panglima Pandikar Amin Mulia (from 28 April)
- Chief Justice:
  - Tun Abdul Hamid Mohamad (until 18 October)
  - Tun Dato' Seri Zaki Azmi (from 18 October)

=== State level ===
- Johor:
  - Sultan of Johor: Sultan Iskandar
  - Menteri Besar of Johor: Abdul Ghani Othman
- Kedah:
  - Sultan of Kedah: Sultan Abdul Halim Mu'adzam Shah
  - Menteri Besar of Kedah:
    - Mahdzir Khalid (until 9 March)
    - Azizan Abdul Razak (from 9 March)
- Kelantan:
  - Sultan of Kelantan: Sultan Ismail Petra
  - Menteri Besar of Kelantan: Nik Abdul Aziz Nik Mat
- Perlis:
  - Raja of Perlis: Tuanku Syed Sirajuddin
  - Menteri Besar of Perlis:
    - Shahidan Kassim (until 17 March)
    - Md Isa Sabu (from 17 March)
- Perak:
  - Sultan of Perak: Sultan Azlan Muhibbuddin Shah
  - Menteri Besar of Perak:
    - Tajol Rosli Mohd Ghazali (until 17 March)
    - Mohammad Nizar Jamaluddin (from 17 March)
- Pahang:
  - Sultan of Pahang: Sultan Haji Ahmad Shah Al-Musta'in Billah
  - Menteri Besar of Pahang: Adnan Yaakob
- Selangor:
  - Sultan of Selangor: Sultan Sharafuddin Idris Shah
  - Menteri Besar of Selangor:
    - Mohamad Khir Toyo (until 13 March)
    - Abdul Khalid Ibrahim (from 13 March)
- Terengganu:
  - Sultan of Terengganu: Tengku Muhammad Ismail (Regent)
  - Menteri Besar of Terengganu:
    - Idris Jusoh (until 25 March)
    - Ahmad Said (from 25 March)
- Negeri Sembilan:
  - Yang di-Pertuan Besar of Negeri Sembilan:
    - Tuanku Ja'afar (until 27 December)
    - Tuanku Muhriz (from 29 December)
  - Menteri Besar of Negeri Sembilan: Mohamad Hasan
- Penang:
  - Governor of Penang: Tun Abdul Rahman Abbas
  - Chief Minister of Penang:
    - Koh Tsu Koon (until 11 March)
    - Lim Guan Eng (from 11 March)
- Malacca:
  - Governor of Malacca: Tun Mohd Khalid Yaakob
  - Chief Minister of Malacca: Mohd Ali Rustam
- Sarawak:
  - Governor of Sarawak: Tun Abang Muhammad Salahuddin
  - Chief Minister of Sarawak: Abdul Taib Mahmud
- Sabah:
  - Governor of Sabah: Tun Ahmadshah Abdullah
  - Chief Minister of Sabah: Musa Aman

== Events ==
=== January ===
- 1 January
  - Visit Terengganu 2008 officially began.
  - Kuala Terengganu achieved city status.
- 2 January – Chua Soi Lek resigned as Health Minister, MCA vice-president, Johor MCA chief and Labis MP due to a sex tape scandal.
- 3 January – Minister of Housing and Local Government, Ong Ka Ting was appointed acting Health Minister.
- 5–13 January – The cycling race 2008 Jelajah Malaysia was staged.
- 9 January – Four-year-old Sharlinie Mohd Nashar went missing after playing at the playground with her older sister in Petaling Jaya, Selangor.
- 10 January – The opening of Malacca Al-Quran Museum in Malacca City, Malacca.
- 12 January
  - The KLCI passed the 1,500 mark for the first time in history, reaching 1,516.22 points.
  - Tenggaroh state assemblyman S. Krishnasamy was assassinated in Johor Bahru.
- 18 January – The second generation of Proton Saga was launched.
- 20–26 January — Malaysia at the 2008 ASEAN Para Games in Nakhon Ratchasima, Thailand.
- 29 January – Official launching of the Sabah Development Corridor (SDC).
- 29 January–3 February – Kuala Lumpur World 5's Futsal Tournament
- 31 January
  - The AEON Bukit Tinggi Shopping Centre with the largest Jusco department store in Southeast Asia was officially opened in Bandar Bukit Tinggi in Klang.
  - The Pavilion Kuala Lumpur shopping complex in Kuala Lumpur, Malaysia was officially opened.

=== February ===
- 1 February – Federal Territory Day, The Federal Territory official awards and honours were introduced.
- 2 February – The Islamic Heritage Park (Taman Tamadun Islam), Kuala Terengganu's newest attraction was officially opened.
- 9 February – The Malaysian Border Regiment (Regimen Pengurusan Sempadan) was introduced.
- 9–17 February – 2008 Tour de Langkawi
- 11 February – Official launch of the Sarawak Corridor of Renewable Energy (SCORE).
- 17 February – The 2008 Malaysian General Elections began. Prime Minister, Abdullah Ahmad Badawi condemned unlawful organisation.
- 25 February – Barisan Nasional (BN) launched its 2008 manifesto.
- 28 February – The opening of the Bernama TV news station on the Astro satellite television service, via Channel 502.

=== March ===
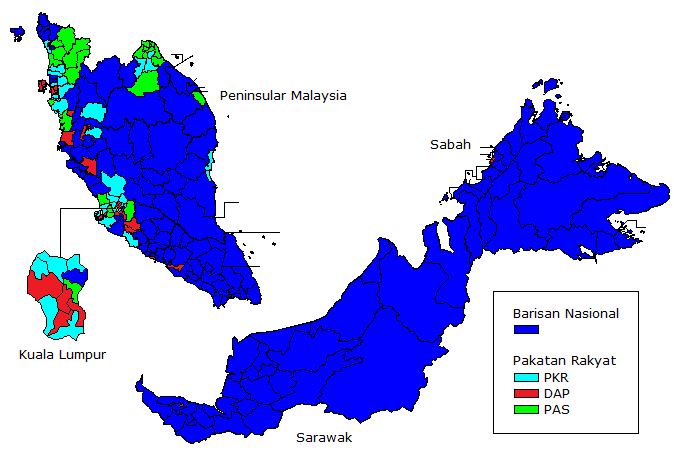
The 2008 Malaysian general elections results.

- 4 March – Election Commission (SPR) cancelled the use of indelible ink for 2008 Malaysian general election.
- 8 March – The 12th Malaysian general election began. The Barisan Nasional, despite its largest loss of seats in forty years, maintained a majority in the Parliament of Malaysia. Kedah, Penang, Perak and Selangor fall to the Pakatan Rakyat.
- 10 March – The KLCI fell by more than 10 percent or 130 points to 1166.32 points.
- 11 March – The Malaysian New Economic Policy (NEP) was abolished in Penang by the DAP-led state government.
- 18 March – The new 2008 cabinet was announced by prime minister Abdullah Ahmad Badawi.
- 25 March – The opening of Malacca Folks Art Gallery in Malacca.

=== April ===
- 1 April – Pakatan Rakyat (PR) consisting of three major political parties, the Democratic Action Party (DAP), Pan-Malaysian Islamic Party (PAS) and Parti Keadilan Rakyat (PKR) was formed.
- 9 April
  - Two passengers were killed when a train plunged into the Padas River near Tenom, Sabah.
  - Armed robbers shot six people in a three-minute heist and walked away with RM 3.5 million in cash at Kuala Lumpur International Airport (KLIA).
- 11 April – The Iskandar Development Region was officially renamed as Iskandar Malaysia.
- 14 April – PKR advisor, Anwar Ibrahim celebrated his official return to the political stage, as his ban from public office expired a decade after he was sacked as deputy prime minister on 2 September 1998.

=== May ===
The approximate location of Middle Rocks in the South China Sea in relation to the countries and islands (Pedra Branca (owned by Singapore) and South Ledge) surrounding it

- 3 May – The driver of a Singapore–bound Ekspres Rakyat train was killed when the locomotive derailed near Seremban, Negeri Sembilan.
- 3–9 May – 2008 Malaysian Paralympiad in Kuala Lumpur.
- 6 May – Blogger Raja Petra Kamarudin jailed over article allegedly implicating deputy prime minister Mohammad Najib Abdul Razak and his wife Rosmah Mansor in the killing of a young Mongolian woman, Altantuya Shaariibuu.
- 7–30 May – The controversial issues about the unopened barricade between Cheras–Kajang Expressway and Bandar Mahkota Cheras.
- 10 May – The second generation of the Perodua Kembara, Perodua Nautica was launched.
- 19 May – Former prime minister Mahathir Mohamad announced his resignation from the UMNO party.
- 23 May – The International Court of Justice (ICJ) awarded Middle Rocks to Malaysia and Pedra Branca (Pulau Batu Puteh) to Singapore, ending a 29-year territorial dispute between the two countries.
- 28 May – Former PKR youth chief, Ezam Mohd Noor rejoined the UMNO party.
- 31 May – 9 June – 2008 Sukma Games in Terengganu.

=== June ===
- 1 June – The Royal Malaysian Air Force (RMAF) celebrated its Golden Jubilee (50th anniversary).
- 2 June – The sale of petrol and diesel were strictly prohibited to any vehicle not registered in Malaysia at the international borders in Perlis, Kelantan, Johor, Sabah and Sarawak. The ban was lifted on 4 June.
- 4 June – The price of petrol rose from RM1.92 to RM 2.70 per litre. Malaysia's petrol price conversion to US$0.84 per litre was higher compared to China US$0.74, Egypt US$0.32, Indonesia US$0.65, Kuwait US$0.21, Qatar US$0.22, Saudi Arabia US$0.12, Turkmenistan US$0.08, and UAE US$0.37
- 6 June – Malaysia's no.1 squash player, Nicol David was conferred Darjah Bakti (DB) by the Yang di-Pertuan Agong, Sultan Mizan Zainal Abidin of Terengganu.
- 18 June – The Sabah Progressive Party (SAPP) president Datuk Yong Teck Lee declared that his party had lost confidence in the prime minister, Abdullah Ahmad Badawi.
- 20 June – Kedah, Penang, Perak and Selangor celebrated the 100th day of the new Pakatan Rakyat government.
- 26 June – Malaysian Prime Minister, Abdullah Ahmad Badawi announced a mid-term review of the Ninth Malaysia Plan.
- 30 June – A lorry smashed into 13 vehicles at Puchong Jaya Interchange of the Damansara–Puchong Expressway. One driver was killed and one Myanmar national.

=== July ===
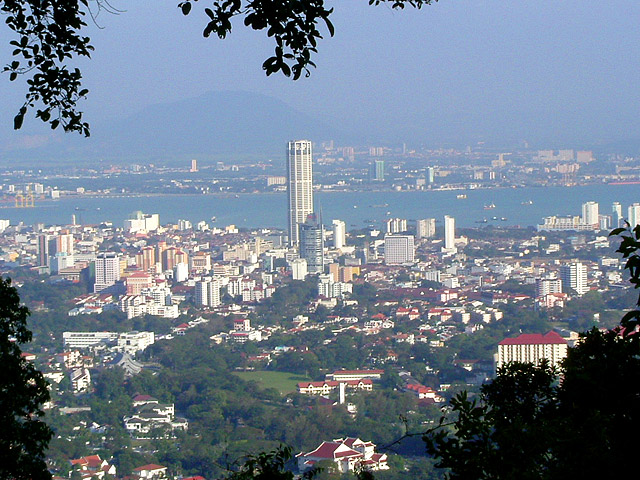
George Town, Penang.

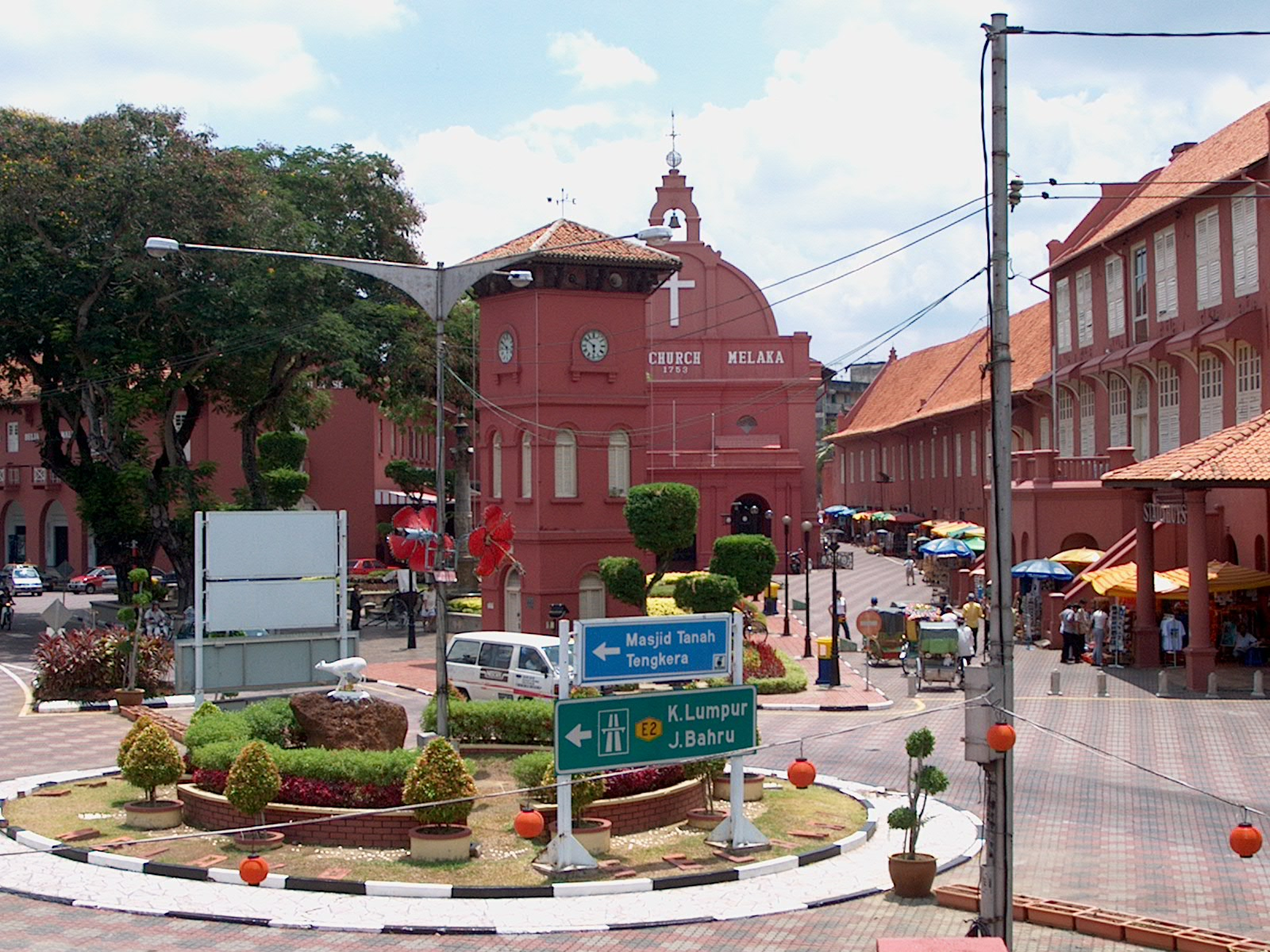
Malacca City, Malacca.

- 4–8 July – The sixth D8 (Developing 8 Countries) Summit 2008 was held in Kuala Lumpur.
- 7 July – Two historic towns in Malaysia, George Town in Penang and Malacca City (inscribed as Melaka) in Malacca were added to UNESCO's coveted World Heritage List.
- 10 July – Malaysian Prime Minister, Abdullah Ahmad Badawi announced that he would step down as UMNO president, Barisan Nasional chairman and Prime Minister in June 2010. He announced that he would transfer power to his Deputy, Mohammad Najib Abdul Razak, a move aimed at reducing the level of political uncertainty in the country.
- 12 July – The world's number one squash player, Nicol David was conferred the Darjah Setia Pangkuan Negeri (DSPN) which carries the title "Datuk" by the state Governor of Penang Tun Abdul Rahman Abbas.
- 15 July – Sultan of Kedah, Sultan Abdul Halim Mu'adzam Shah of Kedah celebrated his Golden Jubilee after successfully reigning in the state of Kedah for 50 years.
- 16 July – PKR advisor, Anwar Ibrahim was arrested by the police over allegations he sodomised a male aide.
- 19 July – The first Malaysian angkasawan (cosmonaut), Sheikh Muszaphar Shukor was conferred the Darjah Setia Negeri Sembilan (DSNS) which carries the title "Datuk" by the Yang di-Pertuan Besar of Negeri Sembilan, Tuanku Ja'afar of Negeri Sembilan.
- 20 July – Malaysia Agro Exposition Park Serdang (MAEPS) the largest agricultural exposition park in Malaysia and Asia was opened to the public.
- 29 July – Chelsea FC Asia Tour 2008*. Chelsea FC vs Malaysia, Malaysia lost 0-2
- 31 July – PKR president, Wan Azizah Wan Ismail resigned her parliamentary seat for Permatang Pauh to let her husband Anwar Ibrahim contest a 2008 Permatang Pauh by-election.

=== August ===
Lee Chong Wei. Malaysia's no.1 badminton player.

- 1 August – A lorry carrying boulders crashed into six vehicles at the East–West Link Expressway, in Taman Connaught, Cheras, Kuala Lumpur, killing two and seriously injuring six.
- 3 August – The Kepong flyover on the Kuala Lumpur Middle Ring Road 2 was closed to all traffic after cracks appeared on pillar 28. This was the third time the 1.7 km MRR2 Kepong flyover was closed because of cracks.
- 7 August – PKR advisor, Anwar Ibrahim was freed on bail after pleading innocent to a sodomy charge.
- 8–24 August – Malaysia completed at the 2008 Summer Olympics in Beijing, China. On 17 August, Malaysian badminton player, Lee Chong Wei, won a silver medal at these Games. This was the first time since the 1996 Summer Olympics that Malaysia win a medal at an Olympic Games.
- 20 August – The MISC vessel registered as MT Bunga Melati Dua was hijacked by a group of armed pirates in the Gulf of Aden, between Yemen and Somalia. There were 29 Malaysian nationals and 10 Philippines nationals on board when the incident occurred.
- 22 August – Lakshman is born.
- 23 August – The petrol and diesel price dropped by eight sen and 22 sen respectively. The price of RON97 petrol reduced by 15 sen to RM2.55 a litre from RM2.70, while RON92 cost 22 sen less at RM2.40 a litre from RM2.62 a litre.
- 26 August – The 2008 Permatang Pauh by-election took place. PKR candidate, Anwar Ibrahim won in this election with a total majority of 15,671 votes beating BN candidate Datuk Arif Shah Omar Shah.
- 27 August – Malaysian national badminton coach Misbun Sidek was conferred the Darjah Mulia Seri Melaka (DMSM) award, which carries the title Datuk by the Governor of Malacca Tun Mohd Khalil Yaakob.
- 28 August – Malaysian badminton player, Lee Chong Wei was conferred the Darjah Setia Pangkuan Negeri (DSPN) award, which carries the title Datuk by the state Governor of Penang Tun Abdul Rahman Abbas.
- 29 August
  - At 9.50 pm another MISC tanker ship registered as MT Bunga Melati Lima was hijacked in international waters off the coast of Yemen.
  - Budget 2009. Themed as the "Caring Budget", it had three specific strategies to ensure the well being of Malaysians, developing quality human capital and strengthening the nation's resilience.
- 31 August – The closing ceremony of Visit Malaysia 2007.

=== September ===
- 5 September – The Royal Malaysian Navy (RMN) deployed three naval vessels KD Lekiu, KD Pahang and KD Sri Inderapura to the Gulf of Aden following the hijacking of two Malaysian tankers.
- 10 September – Bukit Bendera UMNO division chief Datuk Ahmad Ismail was suspended from the party for three years with immediate effect for making a disparaging remark at a political rally in Permatang Pauh.
- 11 September – 16-year-old schoolgirl Lai Ying Xin was abducted by her four schoolmates and murdered by strangulation, before her body was burnt and abandoned in the forests of Kulai, Johor.
- 12 September – Blogger Raja Petra Raja Kamaruddin, Seputeh member of parliament Teresa Kok and a Sin Chew Daily News reporter Tan Hoon Cheng were arrested under the Internal Security Act (ISA).
- 17 September
  - Malaysian prime minister, Abdullah Ahmad Badawi served as Defence Minister while his deputy Mohammad Najib Abdul Razak served as Finance Minister.
  - The Sabah Progressive Party (SAPP) officially pulled out of Barisan Nasional to become an independent party.
- 24 September
  - The price of RON97 petrol reduced by 10 sen to RM2.45 a litre from RM2.55.
  - 300 passengers escaped injury in an accident involving two RapidKL's LRT trains at Sri Petaling Line near Bukit Jalil station.
- 30 September –
  - A boat carrying Indonesians back for Hari Raya sank in the Straits of Malacca 1.2 nautical miles (2.2 km) off Port Klang. Twelve passengers were reported dead.
  - All 65 Malaysian hostages of the MT Bunga Melati Dua and MT Bunga Melati Lima were released.

=== October ===
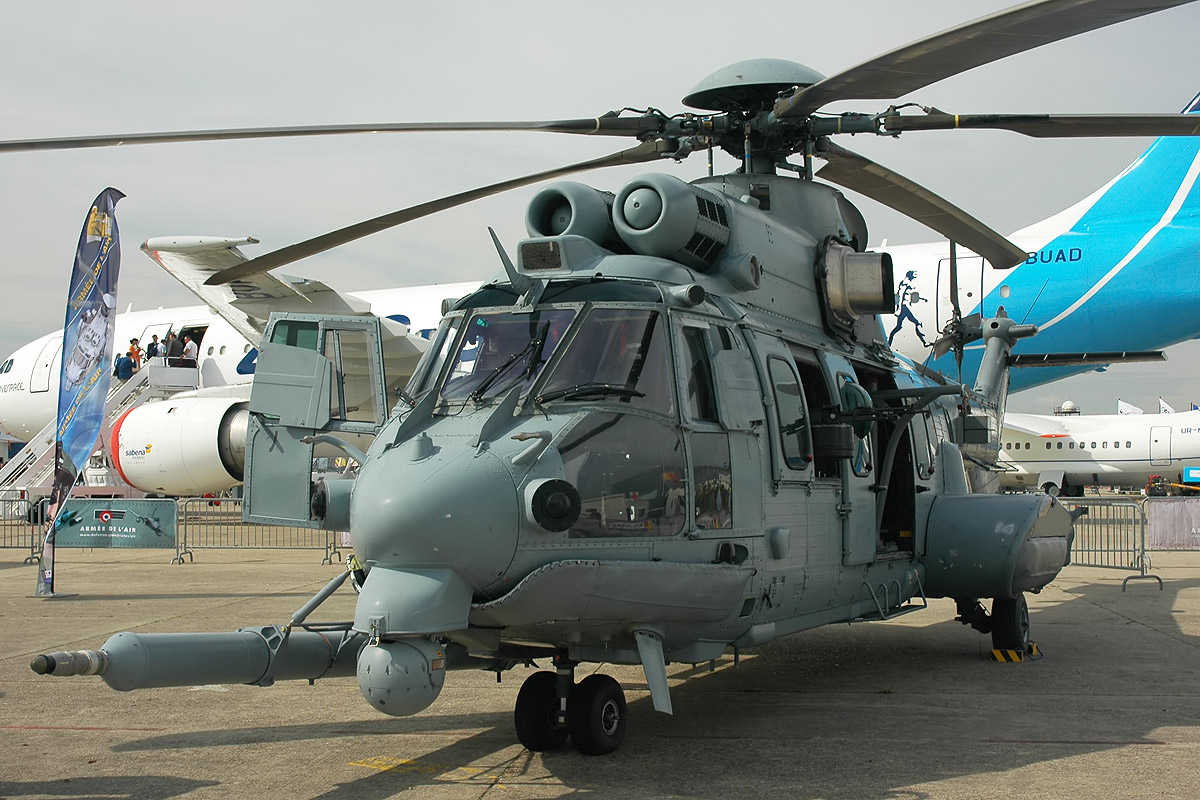
Eurocopter EC 725 for RMAF to replace the Sikorsky S-61.

- 1 October – A group of the Hindu Rights Action Force (HINDRAF) supporters Wednesday caused a stir at the Hari Raya Aidilfitri open house hosted by Prime Minister Abdullah Ahmad Badawi and Muslim Cabinet ministers at the Putra World Trade Centre (PWTC) when they did not observe rules and cut into the queue of others.
- 8 October – Prime Minister, Abdullah Ahmad Badawi announced he would step down as UMNO president, Barisan Nasional chairman and Prime Minister in March 2009. He announced that he would transfer power to his Deputy Prime Minister, Mohammad Najib Abdul Razak.
- 11 October – Bollywood no.1 superstar, Shah Rukh Khan was conferred the Darjah Mulia Seri Melaka (DMSM) award, which carries the title Datuk by the state Governor of Malacca Tun Mohd Khalil Yaakob.
- 12–18 October – Malaysia at the 2008 Commonwealth Youth Games in Pune, India.
- 14 October – The price of RON97 petrol reduced by 20 sen to RM2.30 a litre from RM2.45.
- 15 October – The Hindu Rights Action Force (HINDRAF) was declared an illegal organisation by the federal government.
- 18–26 October – Malaysia at the 2008 Asian Beach Games in Bali, Indonesia.
- 28 October – The government put on hold the purchase of Eurocopter's EC 725 Cougar helicopters replacing the Sikorsky's S-61 Nuri at a cost of RM1.679 billion until the global economic situation stabilised.
- 31 October
  - Political analyst Abdul Razak Baginda, 48, who was charged with abetting in Mongolian Altantuya Shaariibuu's murder, was freed by the High Court.
  - The price of RON97 petrol reduced by 15 sen to RM2.15 a litre from RM2.30.

=== November ===
- 3 November
  - Deputy prime minister Mohammad Najib Abdul Razak won the UMNO presidency elections.
  - Tomboy behavior was banned by Islamic clerics (fatwa) in Malaysia.
  - Newly-elected Gerakan vice-president Datuk Dr. Vijayaratnam Seevaratnam died after he fell from the rooftop of his four-storey shop lot.
- 7–9 November – The FEI World Endurance Championship 2008 was held in Terengganu.
- 8 November
  - The Eye on Malaysia ferris wheel opened in Malacca.
  - Construction of the Sultan Abdul Halim Muadzam Shah Bridge by China Harbour Engineering Company (CHEC) started.
- 13 November – The price of Roti Canai was reduced by 10 sen.
- 14–16 November – The King Of Tennis in Penang
- 16 November — 2008 Penang Bridge International Marathon.
- 17 November – The price of RON97 petrol fell by 15 sen to RM2.00 a litre from RM2.15.
- 18 November –
  - Showdown of Champions Kuala Lumpur 2008
  - Effective 1 January 2009, Class 1 highway users traveling on the North–South Expressway (NSE) and North–South Expressway Central Link (ELITE) between 12:00 midnight and 7:00 am were able to enjoy 10 percent toll discount.
- 22 November – The physical and mental disciplines of yoga were banned by Islamic clerics (known as Fatwā).
- 29 November – Hema Kassippillai, one of the Malaysian women who had been reported missing since the terror attacks in Mumbai, India on Wednesday 26 November, was found dead.
- 30 November – Two sisters were buried alive after a landslide crashed on their bungalow at Lot 110, Jalan Belinda 1, Ulu Yam Perdana, Ulu Yam, Selangor.

=== December ===
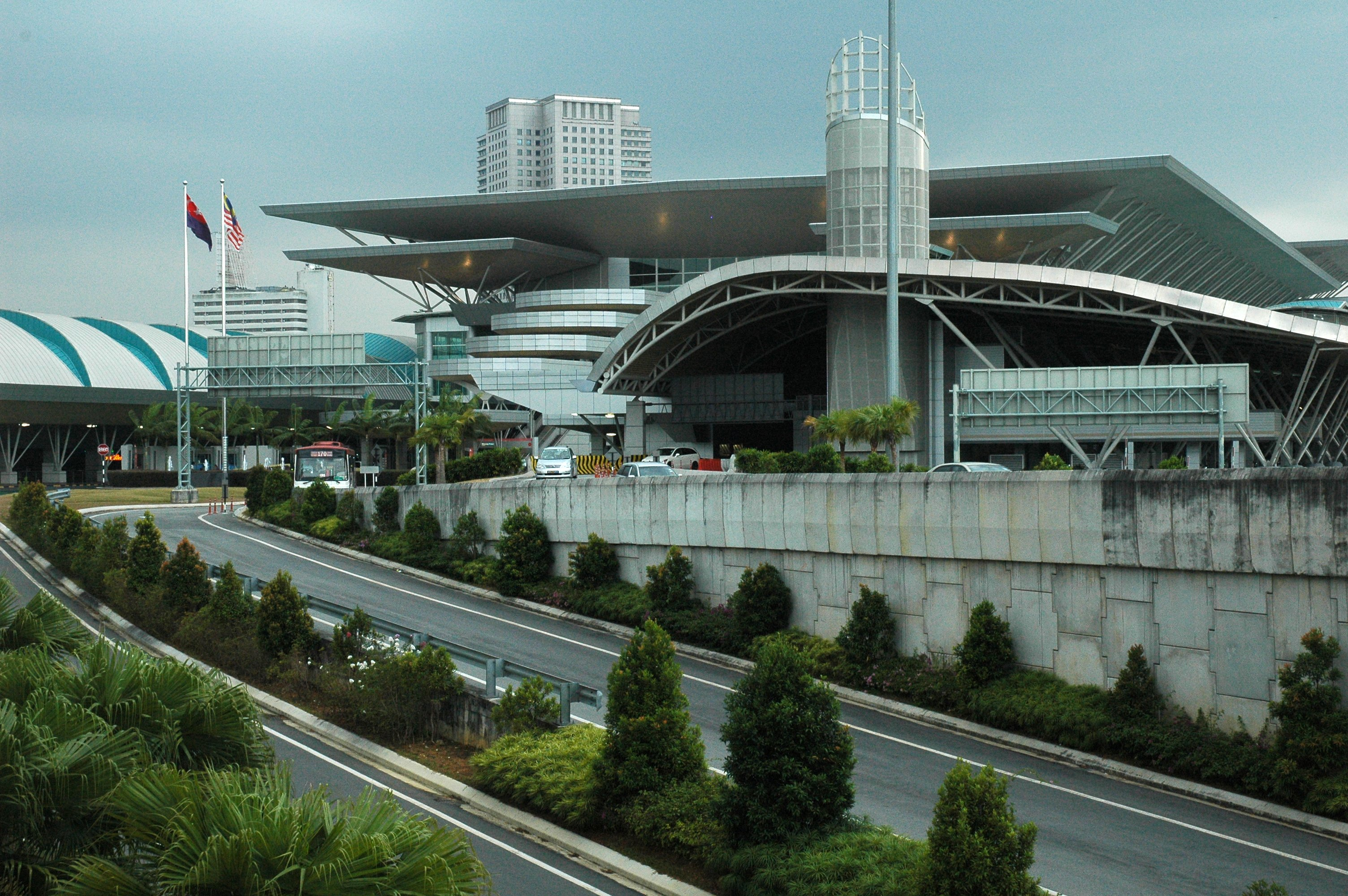
Sultan Iskandar Complex Customs, Immigration and Quarantine Complex (Sultan Iskandar Building)

- 1 December – The new Custom, Immigration and Quarantine (CIQ) Complex building (Southern Integrated Gateway) was officially named as the Sultan Iskandar Building.
- 3–7 December – The 2008 Monsoon Cup yacht race was held in Terengganu.
- 5 December – More than 300 people were forced to evacuate two buildings when a landslide caused part of the retaining wall of a car park to collapse near Amanah Raya Berhad building in Jalan Semantan (Damansara Link on Sprint Expressway), Kuala Lumpur.
- 6 December – Five people were killed and more than eight others were feared buried in a 2008 Bukit Antarabangsa landslide in Bukit Antarabangsa, Ulu Klang, near Kuala Lumpur. The landslide, which is believed to have buried 14 bungalows in Taman Bukit Mewah and Taman Bukit Utama, occurred at about 4am.
- 7 December – 10 passengers were killed in a bus crash at km 146.8 of the North–South Expressway between Tangkak and Pagoh, Johor.
- 11–21 December – 2008 ASEAN University Games were held in Kuala Lumpur.
- 15 December
  - The price of RON97 petrol fell by 10 sen to RM1.80 a litre from RM1.90.
  - 57 people were arrested for participating in a Jaringan Rakyat Tertindas (JERIT) campaign in Sungai Choh, Rawang, Selangor.
- 16 December – The Sultan Iskandar Complex was opened to light vehicles.
- 20 December – Malaysian pop singer Mawi married Ekin.
- 27 December – Tuanku Ja'afar of Negeri Sembilan, the Yang di-Pertuan Besar of Negeri Sembilan and also tenth Yang di-Pertuan Agong (1994–1999) died at the age of 86.
- 29 December – Death of Tuanku Ja'afar of Negeri Sembilan
  - His body was laid to rest at the Seri Menanti Royal Mausoleum in Seri Menanti. Shortly before the funeral, Tunku Besar of Seri Menanti, Tunku Muhriz was elected by the four Undangs as the new Yang di-Pertuan Besar of Negeri Sembilan with the title Tuanku Muhriz.
  - A 40-day mourning period following His Majesty's passing was also observed, commencing on the day of his death.
  - Throughout this period, the state flags were flown at half-mast at all premises, including government offices and buildings.
  - During the mourning period, all male government staff were required to wear a *songkok* with a white band, while female staff wore a white armband. All official government functions and celebratory activities were also postponed for seven days.

=== Full date unknown ===
- International Zakat Organization is founded in Malaysia.

== Independence Day ==
=== Theme ===
Perpaduan Teras Kejayaan (Unity is the Core of Success)

=== Independence Day parade ===
Independence Square, Kuala Lumpur

== Births ==
- 30 September – Luka Jordy Hodak – footballer.

== Deaths ==
- 24 January — Tan Sri Megat Junid, former cabinet minister and Minister of Domestic Trade and Consumer Affairs.
- 4 February — Richard Ho, former minister and Deputy President of the Malaysian Chinese Association.
- 11 March — Datuk Zakaria Deros, controversial political figure and former Port Klang state assemblyman.
- 23 April — Rustam Sani, political writer, analyst and former Deputy President of Parti Rakyat Malaysia.
- 30 April — M. G. Pandithan, President of the Indian Progressive Front and former MP for Tapah.
- 1 May — Tan Sri SM Nasimuddin SM Amin, Group Chairman of Naza (b. 1955)
- 24 June — Tan Sri Eric Chia, former managing director of Perwaja Steel.
- 7 July — Tun Syed Ahmad Shahabuddin, 5th Governor of Malacca and 4th Menteri Besar of Kedah.
- 20 August — Tunku Abdullah, founder and chairman of the Melewar Corporation and former MP for Rawang.
- 4 September — Tan Sri Abdul Samad Ismail, journalist, National Journalism Laureate, writer and editor.
- 11 September – Lai Ying Xin, 16-year-old schoolgirl.
- 20 October — Shamsiah Fakeh, nationalist, feminist and the veteran leader of the Communist Party of Malaya.
- 28 November — Tengku Budriah of Perlis – Raja Perempuan of Perlis and 3rd Raja Permaisuri Agong.
- 17 December — Nasir P. Ramlee, actor and son of the late P. Ramlee.
- 27 December — Tuanku Ja'afar of Negeri Sembilan, Yang di-Pertuan Besar of Negeri Sembilan and 10th Yang di-Pertuan Agong.

=== Dates unknown ===
- Michael Chua – Malaysian bowling player.
- Harbans Singh – Weightlifter.
- Datuk Razali Ismail – Deputy Minister of Education and Kuala Terengganu member of parliament (MP).

== See also ==
- 2008
- 2007 in Malaysia | 2009 in Malaysia
- History of Malaysia
- List of Malaysian films of 2008
