= Zakat (disambiguation) =

Zakat or Zakāt also Zakat al-mal, is a form of alms-giving and religious tax in Islam. It may also refer to

- Zakāt Livestock, Zakāt on livestock or cattle
- Zakat Council, a government body responsible for collecting and distributing Zakat in Pakistan
- International Zakat Organization, an Islamic charitable initiative founded by the Government of Malaysia, which focuses on the use of Zakat
- The Zakat Foundation, a Chicago-based, Muslim non-profit organization
- Zakat al-Fitr, a smaller Islamic charitable donation given on Eid al-Fitr

== See also ==
- Zagat
