= IZO =

IZO may refer to:

- Izo, a 2004 Japanese film
- International Zakat Organization, an organization based in Malaysia
- Izumo Airport, an airport in Japan
