= Wan Man =

Island in Malaysia

Native name: Pulau Wan Man ڤولاو من وان
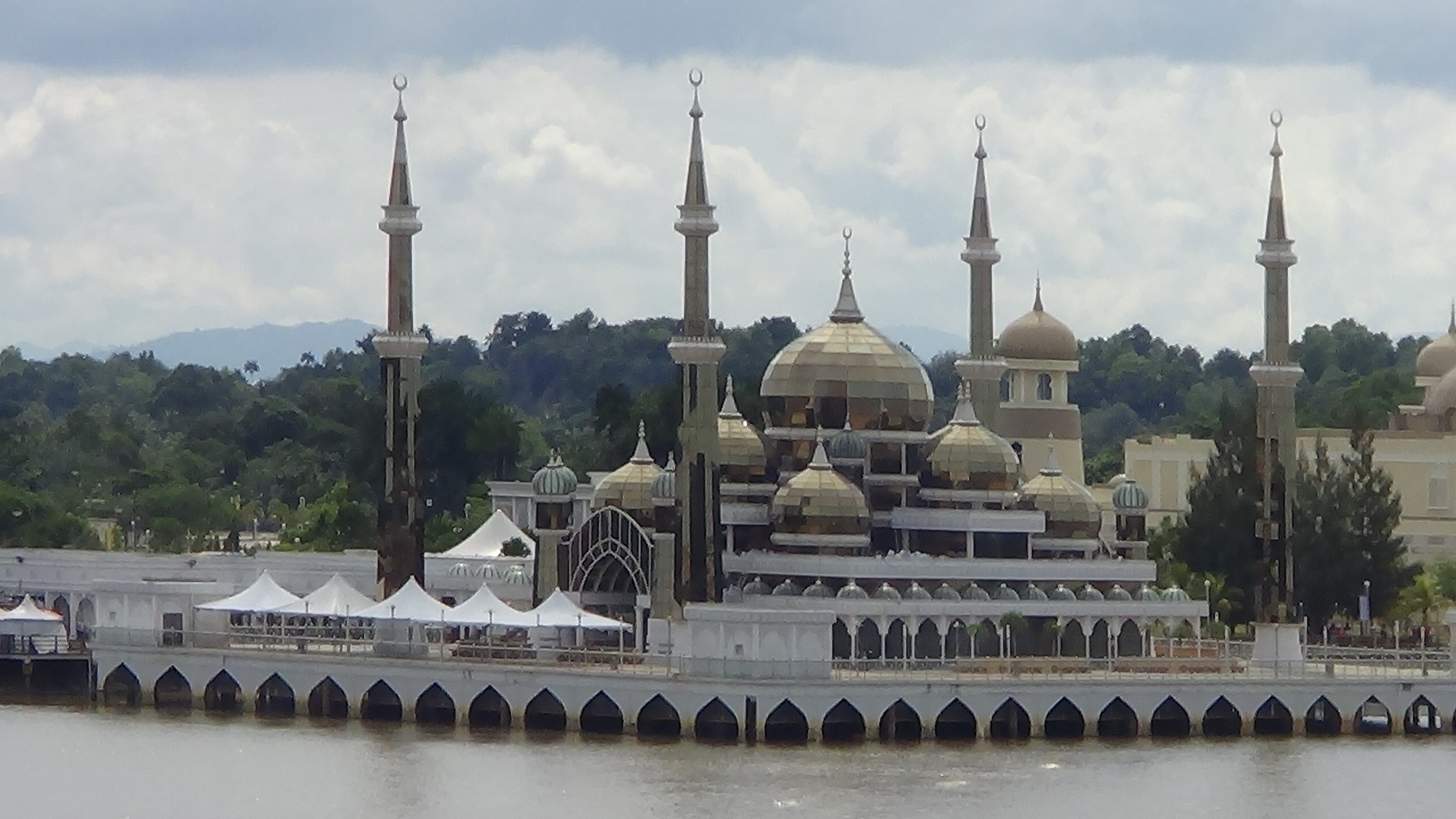
- The Crystal Mosque on Wan Man Island
- Interactive map of Wan Man

Geography
- Location: Terengganu River
- Coordinates: 5°19′0″N 103°7′0″E
- Archipelago: River Islands
- Area: 0.313 km^{2} (0.121 sq mi)

Administration
- Malaysia
- State: Terengganu
- District: Kuala Terengganu
- Mukim: River Islands

Wan Man Island is a small island in Kuala Terengganu, Terengganu, Malaysia. It is located at the river mouth of Terengganu River meeting the South China Sea.

Wan Man Island is the home of Malaysia's Islamic Heritage Park which was opened in February 2008. The park includes Crystal Mosque along the island's northeastern shore, as well as scaled replicas of various landmarks around the world such as India's Taj Mahal and Jerusalem's Dome of the Rock.

Prior to construction of the Islamic Heritage Park, the island had no human inhabitants, but was home to reptiles, with palm forest and thick undergrowth. The size of the island is 0.313 square kilometres (0.121 sq mi).

== See also ==
- List of islands of Malaysia
- Duyong Island
- River island
