= Disappearance of Tin Song Sheng =

1996 missing person case

Tin Song Sheng
- Born: 6 August 1989; Klang, Selangor, Malaysia
- Disappeared: 12 January 1996 (aged 6); Klang, Selangor, Malaysia
- Status: Missing for 30 years, 6 months and 20 days
- Parents: Gan Kim Choo (mother); Tin Kuwi Diun (father)

On 12 January 1996, (Note: There are sources that contradict Song Sheng's disappearance date, with some sources giving 15 January as the disappearance date. However, 12 January was his actual disappearance date.) seven-year old Tin Song Sheng (Chinese: 田鬆生, romanized: Tián Sōng Shēng) disappeared from Taman Rashna Chinese Primary School in Klang, Selangor, Malaysia.

Song Sheng went missing while waiting for the bus to return home after his second week of primary school. His body has never been found and he has never been proven to be dead, similar to the disappearance of Sharlinie Mohd Nashar, which took place 12 years later. No kidnapping or murder charges have ever been filed.

== Disappearance ==
On 12 January 1996, after the school session had concluded, Tin Song Sheng waited for the bus outside the Taman Rashna Chinese Primary School compound in Klang to return home. He was last seen leaving the school with an unidentified middle-aged Chinese woman who wore sunglasses and was driving a white van.

== Search efforts and investigation ==
Tin Song Sheng's parents, Gan Kim Choo and Tin Kuwi Diun, filed a police report the day after the incident, and spent RM40,000 searching for their son, including hiring 80 shamans.

On 16 January 1996, four days after Song Sheng's disappearance, his family appealed to the public to help trace him. At the same time, the police conducted a search for the middle-aged Chinese woman suspected of kidnapping Song Sheng.

Song Sheng's older brother, Tin Song Seng, appealed to the kidnapper to return his brother and said: "Please give my brother back. I love him".

A nationwide search and publicity drive was spearheaded by Malaysian Chinese Association (MCA) Chairman Michael Chong, who enlisted the help of the media, non-governmental organisations, and indigenous people to search for Song Sheng in the jungle. Chong got Thai border authorities to search for the boy.

A RM5,000 reward was offered by his family to the public for those who had information about the missing boy. With the assistance of postman Mohd Amin Yusof, Pos Malaysia distributed about 100,000 posters to all homes and premises in Klang Valley. On 27 January, the police appealed to the public to locate Song Sheng's whereabouts and asked for them to provide information about the woman suspected of kidnapping the boy.

The National Union of the Teaching Profession, on 29 January, asked all teachers to give priority to locate Song Sheng. At the same time, businessman and trader William Liew Soo Teng offered a reward of RM5,000 to anyone who could help bring the boy back to his parents. A day later, the public began searching for Song Sheng with a little assistance from Pos Malaysia which began distributing missing posters about him in Cheras.

On 31 January, the MCA ordered its 700,000 members nationwide to find the boy. About 10,000 members of the Klang Valley Taxi and Car Rental Association also helped distribute 5,000 posters of Song Sheng.

Three days later, Song Sheng's parents Kim Choo and Kuwi Diun appealed to the public not to offer any rewards as they believed that "it could lead to complications, such as the abductors hoping for a higher amount" of ransom before releasing their son. By 12 February, the Johor Bahru MCA branch had printed 10,000 posters and pamphlets across the town to locate the boy.

== In popular culture ==
The story of his disappearance was reenacted on TV3's docudrama TV series, Kisah Benar (True Stories) in an episode of its 17th season and it ended with a short segment of Song Sheng's parents, Kim Choo and Kuwi Diun, making a heartfelt plea to the kidnappers to return their child.

== See also ==
- Disappearance of Sharlinie Mohd Nashar
- List of people who disappeared mysteriously (2000–present)
