= Calculation of Zakāt =

Religious tax obligations in Islam

Zakāt (Arabic: زكاة zakāt, "that which purifies", also Zakat al-mal Arabic: زكاة ألمال, "zakat on wealth") is a form of alms-giving treated as a religious tax and/or religious obligation in Islam for all Muslims who meet the necessary criteria of wealth, and one of the Five Pillars of Islam. Beneficiaries of zakat include orphans, the widowed, poor Muslims, the debt-ridden, travelers, new converts to Islam, and Islamic clergy. Zakat is prescribed to cleanse the individual's wealth, heart, and baser characteristics in general, and to replace them with virtues.

Zakat is based on income and the type and value of one's assets/possessions above a minimum amount known as nisab. (Note: In addition to property exceeding the amount of Nisab, conditions required for Zakah to become obligatory include: the owner of the property being mature and sane; being able to dispense with the property. In the case of cows, sheep, camels, the livestock must have been in possession of the owner for at least twelve months. However, if having met the conditions for zakat at the beginning of the twelfth month, some of the conditions disappear later on in the month, the obligation of Zakah remains.)) The Quran does not provide specific guidelines on which types of wealth are taxable under the zakat, nor how much is to be donated, and Islamic scholars differ on how much nisab is and other aspects of zakat. However, the amount of zakat paid on capital assets (e.g. money) and stock-in-trade and jewelry is customarily 2.5% (1/40). Zakat is also payable on agricultural goods, precious metals, minerals, and livestock at a rate varying between 2.5 and 20 percent, depending on the type of goods. Income from business, salaries and other means are traditionally exempt.

== Doctrine ==
While the Quran talks about the importance of zakat (Quran 7:156) and gives general guidance on who should receive it (Quran 2:215), it does not specify which types of wealth are "zakatable", nor how much is to be given in zakat.

While some kinds of wealth are mentioned in the hadith in regards to zakat (for example wheat, rye, date, raisin, camels, silver), many others are not. Consequently, the eminent scholar of fiqh Yusuf al-Qaradawi emphasizes the importance in zakat regulation of the use of ijma' (the agreement of scholars), and qiyas (analogy or applying to a case the same ruling given to a similar case because of common reason (`illah)). An example of use of ijma is the rule that zakah is "obligatory on golden assets at the same rate as it is on silver", (i.e. one fourth of a tenth) despite the fact that only silver had zakat ordered upon it by a hadith by Muhammad. Zakat regulations on silver and gold are also an example of qiyas as both metals are being "used in several countries as measures and store of value", and so are analogous.

According to Mohammad Najatuallah Siddiqui, the ulema (Islamic scholars) are "unanimous in regarding the rates of Zakat as permanently fixed by Islamic law", but "a number" of recent writers, "mostly economists, argue in favour of making these rates amendable to modification".

=== Gold and silver ===
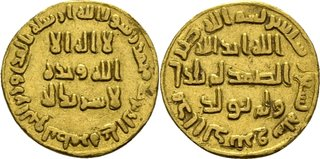
Gold dinar of Umayyad Caliph

Al-Qaradawi quotes Imam Al-Shafi‘i in his Al Risalah about zakah on gold: "The Prophet of God ordered zakah on silver currency and Muslims after him collected zakah on gold. They were either depending on a hadith of the Prophet that never reached our times or applying analogy because of the similarities between gold and silver as money, since both were used in several countries as measures and store of value."

Jewellery and precious metals — such as gold and silver — come under zakat even if they are used merely for decorative purposes. Zakat can be calculated on property, gold, income, diamond, etc. and before paying zakat, It is important to see who are eligible for zakat. The gold considered in determining the Zakat threshold is 24 karats because 21, 18, and other karats are not pure gold; they are mixed with other metals and alloys. If someone has gold of another karat, such as 22, 21, 18, 14, 10, or any other, Zakat is obligatory only on the pure part of it.

=== Farm produce ===
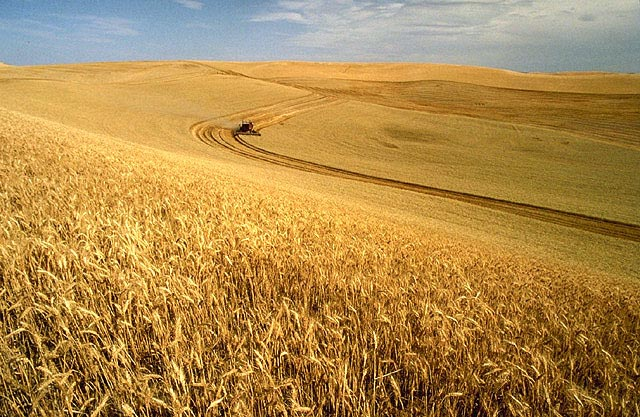
Wheat harvest

According to al-Qardawi, the grains and fruits mentioned in the hadith on zakah are limited to wheat, rye, date and raisins. However, the majority of scholars prescribed zakah on different kinds of grains and fruits by analogy to those grains and fruits mentioned by Muhammad instead of restricting zakah to the items stated in the hadith. ... By the same token, we apply the analogy to silk, milk and other animal products because they are similar to honey, which is mentioned in the Traditions. ... It is reported that 'Umar used an analogy with respect to zakah when he ordered zakah on horses after he realized that they had become high in value, saying, "Should we only take one sheep out of every forty sheep and leave horses with nothing?" 'Umar was followed in that respect by Abu Hanifah13.

The classic fiqh nisab for dates or grain is five wasq (609.84 kg), so that no zakat is due if the amount of dates or grain possessed is less than that. Zakah is payable on the gross yield of land for each crop.

=== Livestock ===
"Zakāt" on Livestock or cattle, Al-An'am Arabic: زكاة الأنعام According to Fiqh az-Zakat by al-Qaradawi and other traditional handbooks of zakat fiqh (such as one issued by IslamKotob,) zakat on livestock such as sheep, cows and camels should be paid in-kind according to a detailed schedule.

==== Scripture and livestock ====
Livestock (Al-An'am) and how God created them are mentioned in the Quran in Surat Al-An'am (136), and Surat An-Nahl (5). Flocks and feeding the poor are mentioned in Surat Al-Hajj (28).

How sinners will be punished in Hell for not having paid due zakat on livestock is mentioned in the hadith: Narrated Abu Dhar: Once I went to him (the Prophet) and he said, "By Allah in Whose Hands my life is (or probably said, 'By Allah, except Whom none has the right to be worshipped), whoever has camels or cows or sheep and does not pay their zakat, those animals will be brought on the Day of Resurrection far bigger and fatter than before and they will tread him under their hooves, and will butt him with their horns, and (those animals will come in circle): When the last does its turn, the first will start again, and this punishment will go on till Allah has finished the judgments amongst the people." (Bukhari, Vol.2, Book 24, No. 539)

==== Camels ====
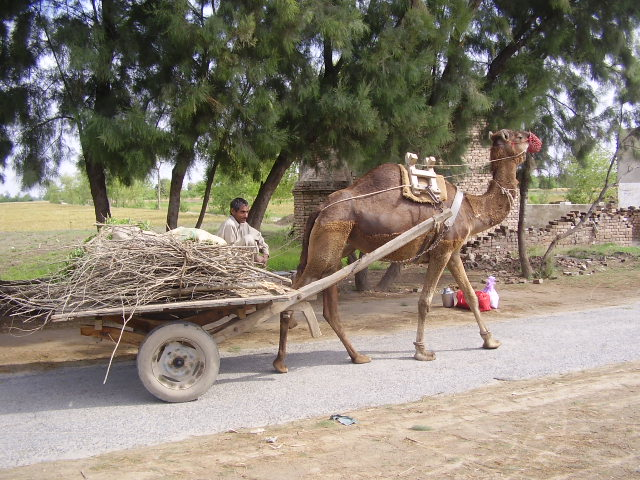
Camel used as a draft animal

The following table shows the ranges of camel numbers and the corresponding due zakah.

Number owned	Zakat
1–4	0
5–9	1 Goat or sheep (1 yr old)
10–14	2 Goat or sheep (1 yr old)
15–19	3 Goat or sheep (1 yr old)
20–24	4 Goat or sheep (1 yr old)
25-35	1 One-year-old she-camel
36–45	1 Two-year-old she-camel
46–60	1 Three-year-old she-camel
61–75	Four-year-old she-camel
76–90	2 Two-year-old she-camel
91–120	2 Three-year-old she-camel
121–129	3 three-year-old she-camels
130–139	2 Two-year-old she-camel + Three-year-old she-camel
140–149	1 Two-year-old she-camel + 2 Three-year-old she-camel
150–159	3 Three-year-old she-camel
160–169	4 Two-year-old she-camel
170–179	1 Three-year-old she-camel +3 Two-year-old she-camel
180–189	2 Three-year-old she-camel +2 Two-year-old she-camel
190–199	3 Three-year-old she-camel +1 Two-year-old she-camel
200–209	4 Three-year-old she-camel or 5 Two-year-old she-camel

==== Cows, and buffaloes (Domestic and not wild) ====
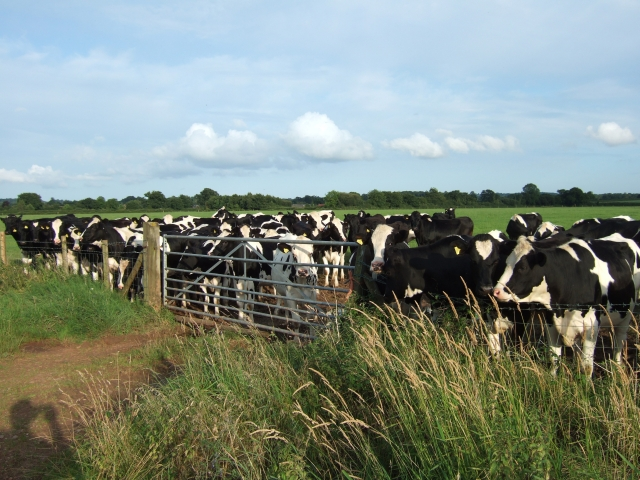
Cows

According to al-Qaradawi there are no hadiths / ahadith that prescribe the nisab for cows:

There are no sahih (authentic / sound) hadiths that provide us with the nisab and rates of zakah on cows as we have seen in the case of camels. This may be because cows were rare in the area of Hijaz (around Makkah and Madinah); it may be also because cows are close in size and value to camels, so the Prophet did not determine their rates on the assumption of their obvious similarity. But the fact that there is no sahih hadith on the issue has left the jurists with varying views on the determination of nisab and rates.

However, the "reputed position upheld by the four schools of jurisprudence" is that the nisab is 30 cows, and so, the due zakah on 30-39 cows is a one-year old cow, and on 40-59 cows is a two-year-old cow, and so on (see below).

Number owned	Zakat
1-29	0
30–39	1- One-year-old Bull-Calf (Male)
40–59	1- Two-year-old Cow-Calf (Female)
60–69	2- One-year-old calf (Male or Female)
70–79	1- Two-year-old Cow-Calf (Female) + 1- One-year-old Bull-Calf (Male)
80-89	2- Two-year-old Cow-Calf (Female)
90–99	3- One-year-old Cow-Calf (Female)
100–109	1- Two-year-old Cow-Calf (Female) + 2- One-year-old Bull-Calf (Male)
110–119	2- Two-year-old Cow-Calf (Female) + 2- One-year-old Bull-Calf (Male)
120–129	3- Two-year-old Cow-Calf (Female) or 4- One-year-old Bull-Calf (Male)

==== Sheep and goats ====
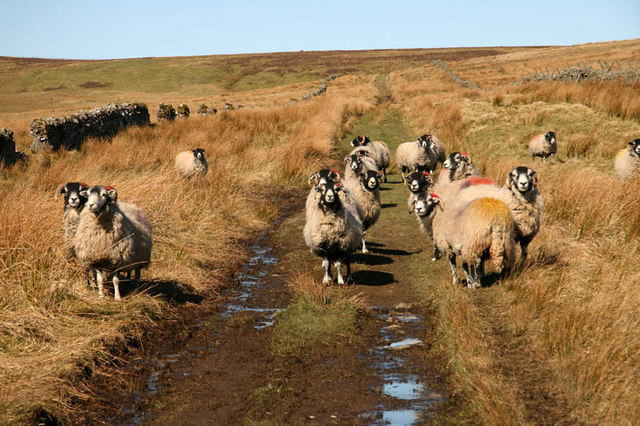
Sheep

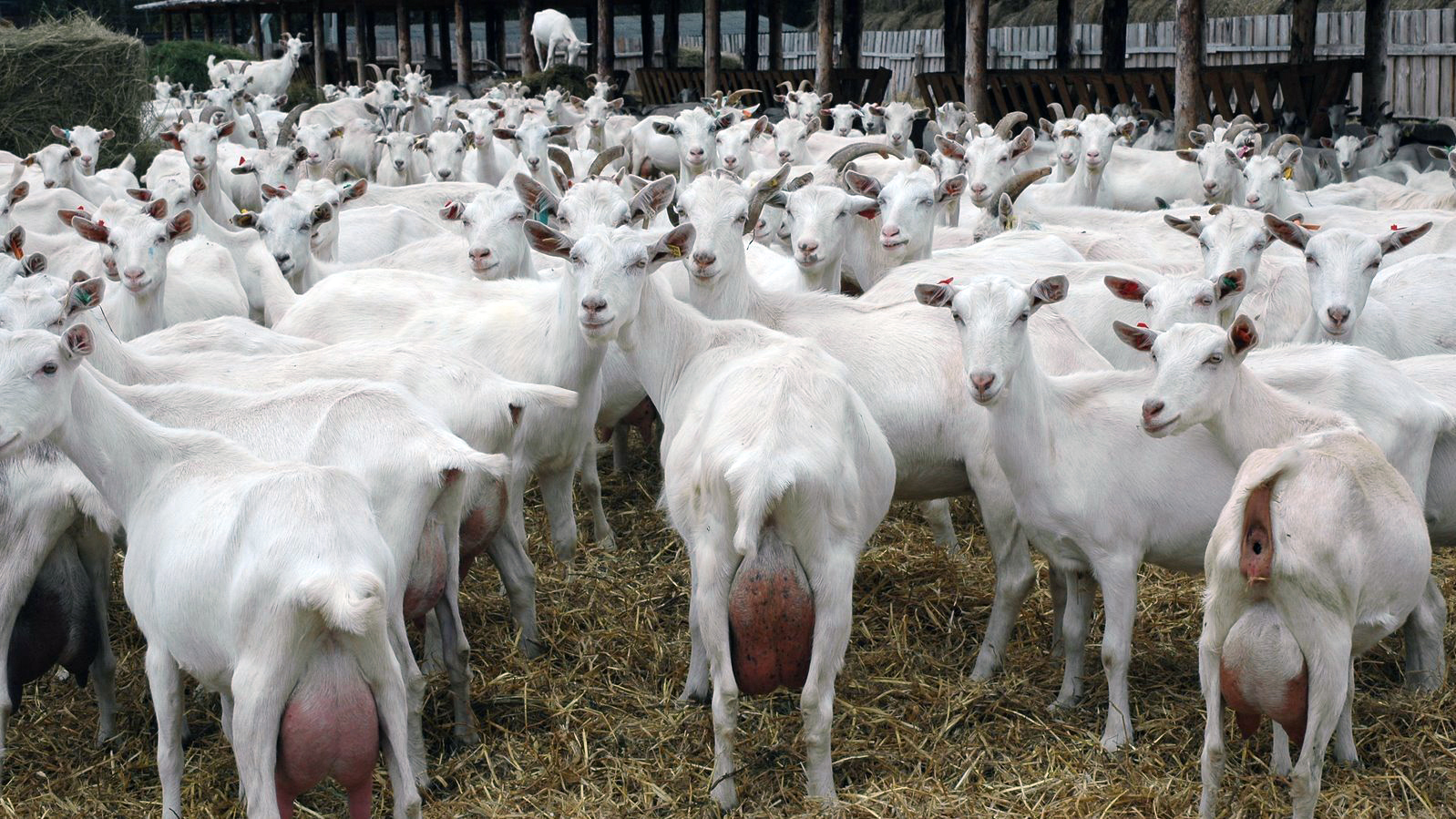
Goats

There is no zakat on sheep and goats until their number reaches forty. [Neither male or female is specified].

Number owned	Zakat
1-39	0
40–120	1- Goat or sheep (not less than 1 yr old)
121–200	2- Goat or sheep (not less than 1 yr old)
201–300	3- Goat or sheep (not less than 1 yr old)
301–400	4- Goat or sheep (not less than 1 yr old)
401-500	5- Goat or sheep (not less than 1 yr old)
And So On	Every 100 Goat or sheep have 1 due

== Contemporary practice ==
As of 2010, Zakat was mandatory by state law and collected by the state in six Muslim majority countries: Libya, Malaysia, Pakistan, Saudi Arabia, Sudan, and Yemen, according to researcher Russell Powell.

There were government-run but voluntary Zakat contribution programs in Bahrain, Bangladesh, Egypt, Indonesia, Iran, Jordan, Kuwait, Lebanon, and the United Arab Emirates.

The states where zakat is compulsory differ in their definition of what assets (and sometimes income) are "zakatable"—eligible for contributing zakat. A 1995 study by Fouad Abdullah al-Omar found many differences.

- Agricultural produce. All six countries charge zakat on agricultural produce, but in Malaysia only rice is subject to zakat.
- Livestock. Five countries (Libya, Malaysia, Saudi Arabia, Sudan, Yemen) subject Livestock to zakat. Only one country (Libya) includes camels and cows used for agricultural work (ploughing, irrigation, etc.).
- Precious metals. Zakat on Gold, silver, cash and other forms of invisible wealth is collected in four countries, but the assets are assessed differently in the different countries.
- Treasures buried in the earth. Three countries (Libya, Saudi Arabia, and Sudan) collect zakat for treasures buried in the earth.
- Wealth that yields income. Only one country, Sudan, imposes zakat `on wealth that yields income, such as rented property, factories, farms, etc.` and in two countries (Sudan and Saudi Arabia) `regulations provide for the collection of zakah in respect of factories, hotels, art producing companies, taxi owners and offices of real estate agents`.
- Income. Income is subject to zakat in only two of the six countries: `The Saudi and Malaysian regulations are ... the same as to the imposition of the zakah in respect of free vocational jobs and employees` salaries` Kahf (1999:27-8) explicates that the income of certain professionals (physicians, engineers, lawyers, etc.) is subject to zakat in Saudi Arabia only if they work independently but not if they are salaried person, while professional incomes are generally not included in zakat in Yemen but always—whether independent or salaried—in Sudan."

== See also ==
- Zakat
- Zakat al-Fitr
- Nisab
