= Bandar Mahkota Cheras toll dispute =

The Bandar Mahkota Cheras toll dispute occurred at a bypass road in the 11th mile of the Cheras–Kajang Expressway in the town of Bandar Mahkota Cheras, Selangor, Malaysia since October 2005, and more recently in a dramatic turn of events between April 2008 and early June 2008.

== Background ==
In October 2005, during the construction of the Bandar Mahkota Cheras, an access road connecting the new township and the Bandar Tun Hussein Onn Interchange (704) was built by the developer to provide access to Bandar Mahkota Cheras from Cheras–Kajang Highway and vice versa. The access was closed by the toll concessionaire, Grand Saga, under the direction of the Malaysian Highway Authority (MHA) due to disputes between Grand Saga and the developer of Bandar Mahkota Cheras, Narajaya, on compensations since the link road would allow motorists to bypass the 11th mile toll plaza on the expressway. As a result, residents travelling to Kuala Lumpur are required to enter the expressway via Bandar Sungai Long or vice versa, while having to pay fares for both the 9th mile and 11th mile toll plaza. Over the years, the access road became a source of dissatisfaction and gripes by the local residents of Bandar Mahkota Cheras.

Several protests were held over the years against the barricading of the access road, but to no avail. It was not until the 12th Malaysian general election, the state government, which owned 30% of Grand Saga fell under the control of the opposition government following the defeat of Barisan Nasional in Selangor.

== The dispute ==
On 21 April 2008, local residents took the dispute into their own hands and dismantled the barricades for the first time by hand, temporarily allowing traffic to and from the township to directly enter and exit the expressway for three weeks. A few days later, the Hulu Langat land office confirmed that concessionaire Grand Saga had no rights over the access road.

In the following days, it was a cat-and-mouse game between the residents and the concessionaire, as the barrier was repeatedly rebuilt by Grand Saga only to be dismantled by the residents shortly after. In some instances, residents pooled hundreds of dollars to hire trucks and heavy machinery to bring the barricade down.

On 8 May 2008, residents clashed with the police while they were protecting the access road from being rebuilt by Grand Saga. Segambut MP Lim Lip Eng was allegedly assaulted by the Police and was hospitalised. Several accusations of police brutality were made.

The residents attempted to obtain an injunction against Grand Saga to rebuild the barrier on the access road. On 13 May 2008, the court denied the injunction and Grand Saga vowed to put up another barrier.

On 27 May 2008, a five-foot wall was erected by Grand Saga. Some residents and journalists (including mainstream newspapers) at the scene were attacked by unidentified men who were armed with sticks, pipes and helmets, sitting on the walls to prevent them from being dismantled. They also smashed the windows of a few nearby vehicles. Police reports were lodged and residents accused Grand Saga of hiring thugs to ensure that the wall remained in place, a charge that the concessionaire vehemently denied. The next day, the barrier was torn down once again.

Members of the opposition state government tried to bring up the issue on the Malaysian Parliament, only to be shot down by the speaker. A few days later, the Federal Government ordered that the access road was to stay open until the court makes a final decision on the dispute.

On 4 June 2008, the Malaysian Highway Authority and Grand Saga were ordered to install traffic lights on the junctions of Bandar Mahkota Cheras to ease the traffic flow of the residents.
