= Crystal Mosque =

Mosque in Kuala Terengganu, Terengganu, Malaysia

- Masjid Kristal
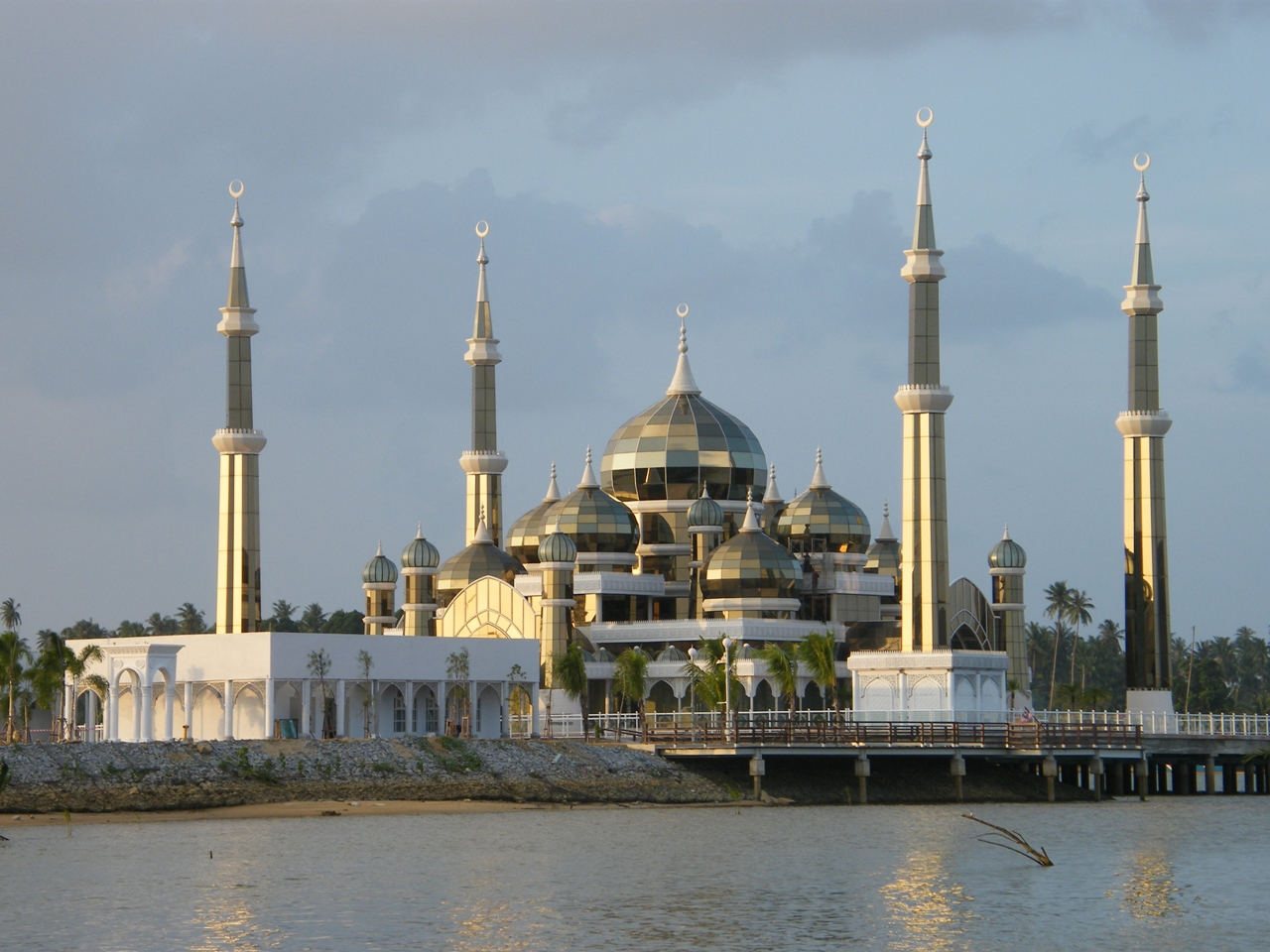
- Crystal mosque

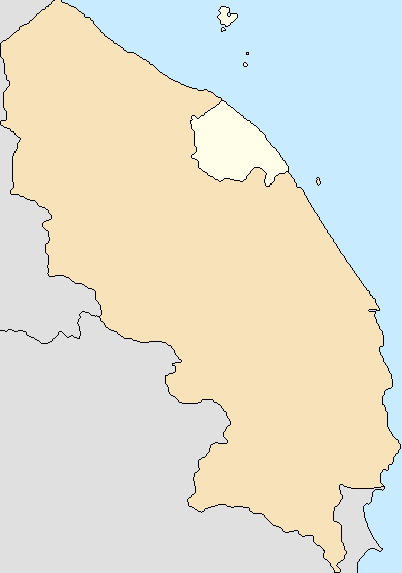
- Location within Kuala Terengganu

Religion
- Affiliation: Islam
- Branch/tradition: Sunni

Location
- Location: Kuala Terengganu, Terengganu, Malaysia
- Interactive map of Crystal Mosque
- Coordinates: 5.322224°N 103.120571°E

Architecture
- Architects: Sanderson Design Group and AHS Architects.
- Type: mosque
- Style: Islamic Architecture; Mughal Architecture
- Established: 2008, February
- Groundbreaking: 2006
- Construction cost: $80 Millions,

Specifications
- Capacity: 1,500
- Domes: 9 Large Domes and 51 Small Domes.
- Minaret: 4

The Crystal Mosque or Masjid Kristal is a mosque in Wan Man, Kuala Terengganu, Terengganu, Malaysia. A grand structure made of steel, glass and crystal, the mosque is located at the Islamic Heritage Park on the island of Wan Man. The mosque was constructed between 2006 and 2008, and was officially inaugurated on 8 February 2008 by the 13th Yang di-Pertuan Agong, Sultan Mizan Zainal Abidin of Terengganu. It has the capacity to accommodate over 1,500 worshipers at a time.

== Gallery ==
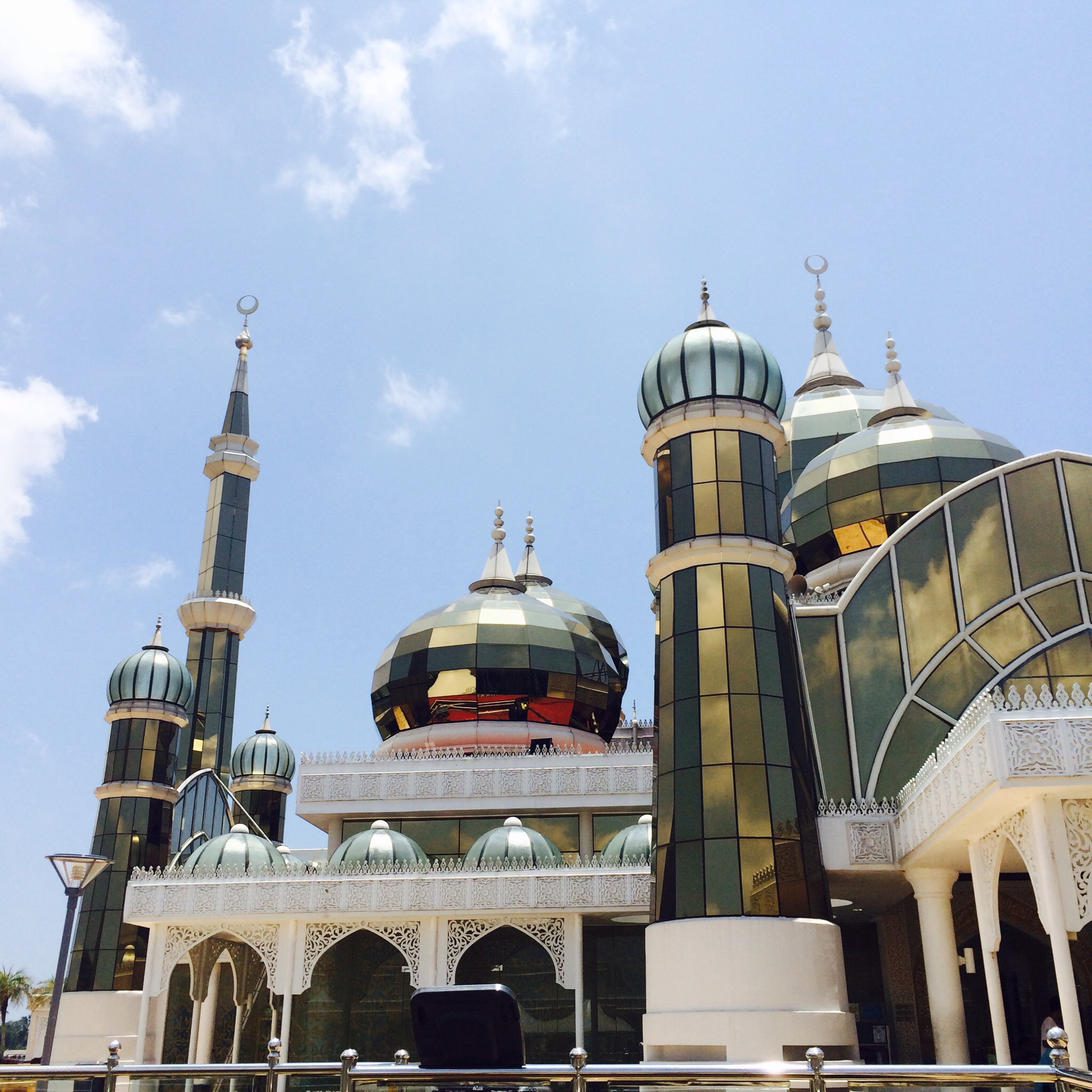
Crystal Mosque

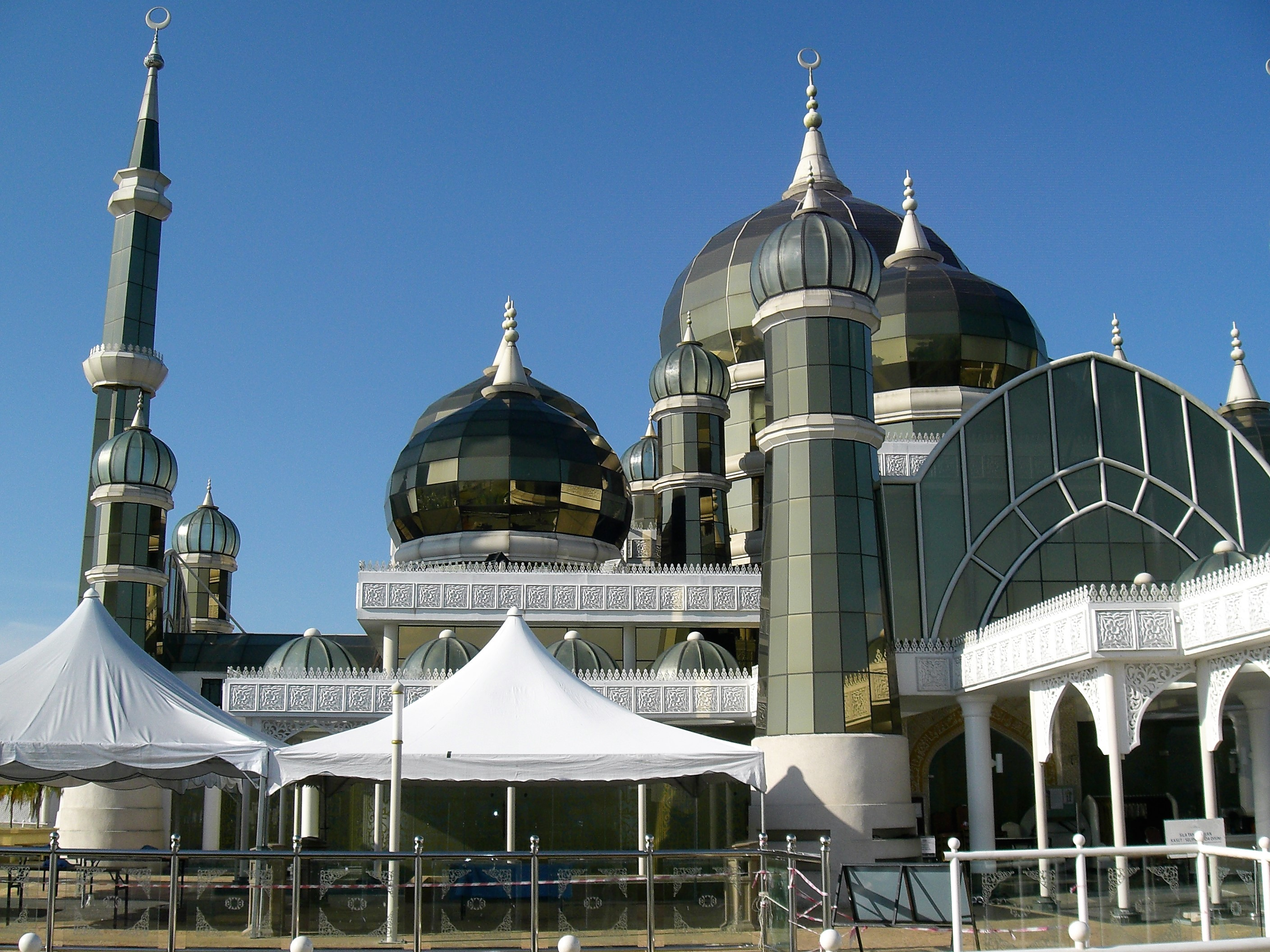
Crystal Mosque

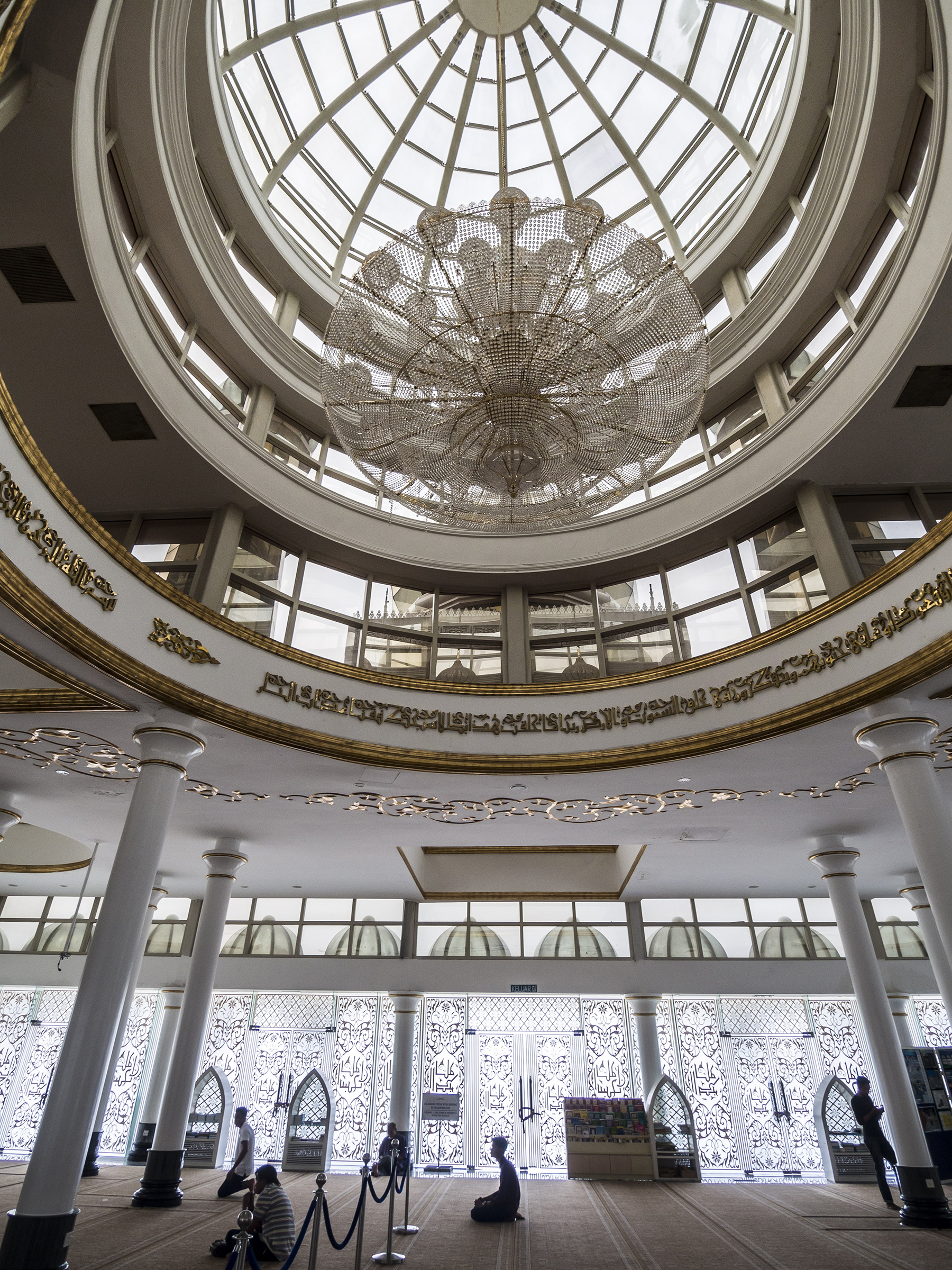
Interior view of Crystal Mosque, Terengganu

== See also ==
- List of mosques in Asia
- Kuala Terengganu
- Islamic Heritage Park
- Islam in Malaysia
