= Melaka Folks Art Gallery =

Art gallery in Malacca City, Malacca, Malaysia

- Galeri Seni Rakyat Melaka
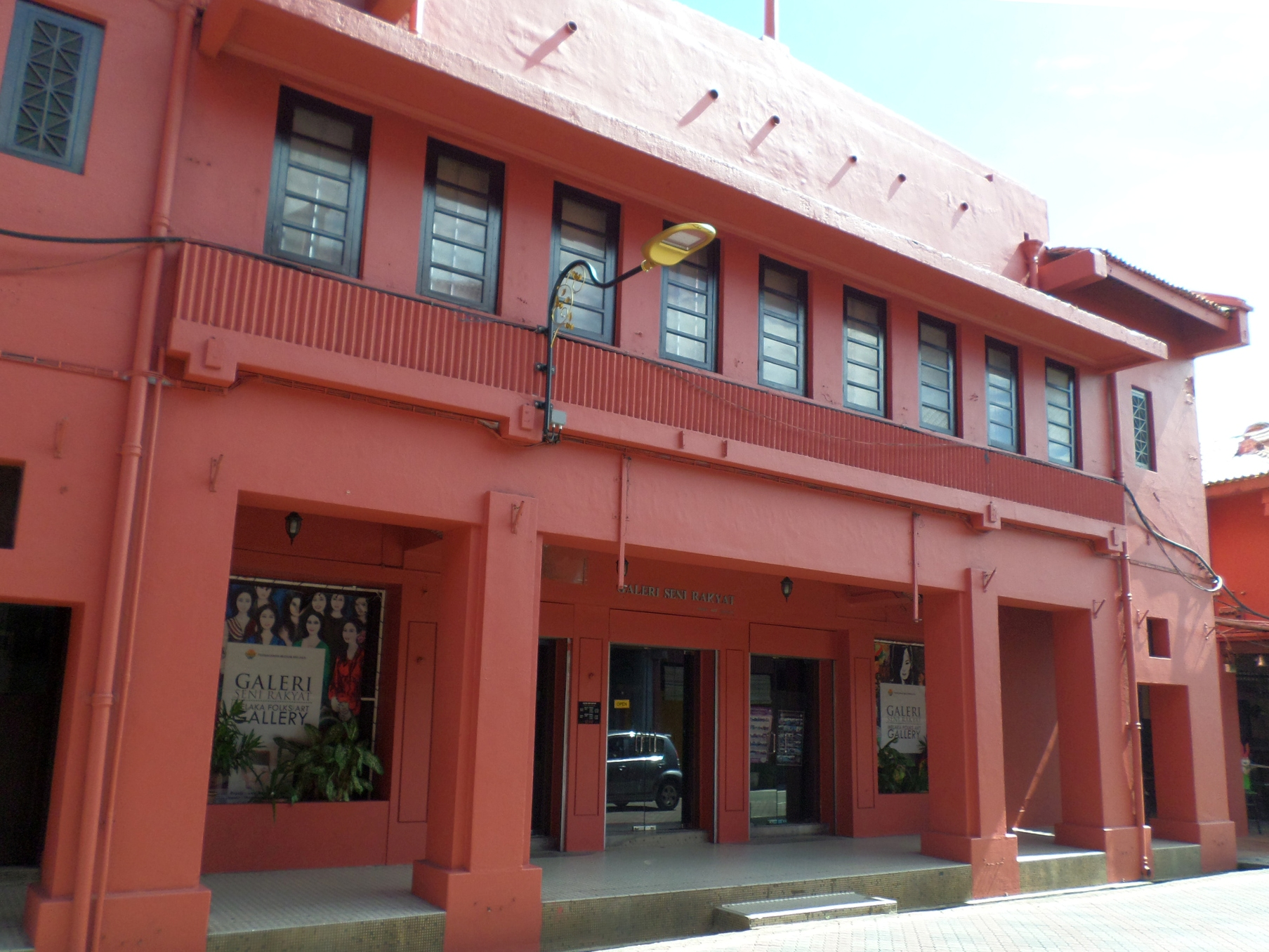
- Established: 25 March 2008
- Location: Jalan Laksamana, Malacca City, Malacca, Malaysia
- Coordinates: 2°11′42.4″N 102°14′58.6″E
- Type: gallery
- Owner: Malacca Museum Corporation

Melaka Folks Art Gallery (Note: Gallery uses the Malay language spelling of the state's name, as opposed to the more traditional English language spelling of its name, "Malacca".) (Malay: Galeri Seni Rakyat Melaka) is an art gallery in Malacca City, Malacca, Malaysia, dedicated to promote the work and themes of the state's local artists.

== History ==
The gallery was inspired by Yang di-Pertua Negeri of Malacca Mohd Khalil Yaakob. It was opened on 25 March 2008 and was officiated by Chief Minister Mohd Ali Rustam on 28 June 2008.

== Architecture ==
The gallery is housed in a two-story building. It consists of a painting studio room for painters to produce their artworks and a shop.

== Exhibitions ==
The main exhibition hall of the gallery houses more than 80 paintings with various themes made by local artists. The gallery regularly held various painting exhibitions as well as painting workshops.

== See also ==
- List of tourist attractions in Malacca
