= Islamic Heritage Park =

Islamic-themed recreational park in Kuala Terengganu, Terengganu, Malaysia

Coordinates: 5°19′20.1″N 103°07′00.0″E

Islamic Heritage Park Taman Tamadun Islam

Wan Man Island, Kuala Terengganu, Terengganu, Malaysia
- Opening date: 2 February 2008

The Islamic Heritage Park (Malay: Taman Tamadun Islam) is a famous attraction in Kuala Terengganu, Terengganu, Malaysia. This park is located at the island of Wan Man.

== History ==
The Islamic Heritage Park was opened on 2 February 2008.

== Famous attractions ==
- Masjid Kristal (Crystal Mosque)

=== Notable mosques replicas ===
1. Al-Masjid al-Nabawi, Medina, Saudi Arabia
2. Masjid al-Haram, Mecca, Saudi Arabia
3. Dome of the Rock, Jerusalem
4. Qolsharif Mosque, Kazan, Tatarstan, Russia
5. Masjid Negara, Kuala Lumpur, Malaysia
6. Masjid Menara Kudus, Kudus, Indonesia
7. Great Mosque of Xi'an, Xi'an, China
8. Great Mosque of Samarra, Samarra, Iraq
9. Pattani Mosque, Pattani Province, Thailand
10. Al-Hambra Mosque, Granada, Spain
11. Aleppo Citadel, Aleppo, Syria
12. Süleymaniye Mosque, Istanbul, Turkey
13. Omar Ali Saifuddien Mosque, Bandar Seri Begawan, Brunei
14. Sultan Mosque, Singapore
15. Badshahi Mosque, Lahore, Pakistan
16. Muhammad Ali Mosque, Cairo, Egypt
17. Kalyan Minaret, Bukhara, Uzbekistan
18. Sheikh Lotfollah Mosque, Isfahan, Iran

=== Other ===
Taj Mahal, India

== Image gallery ==
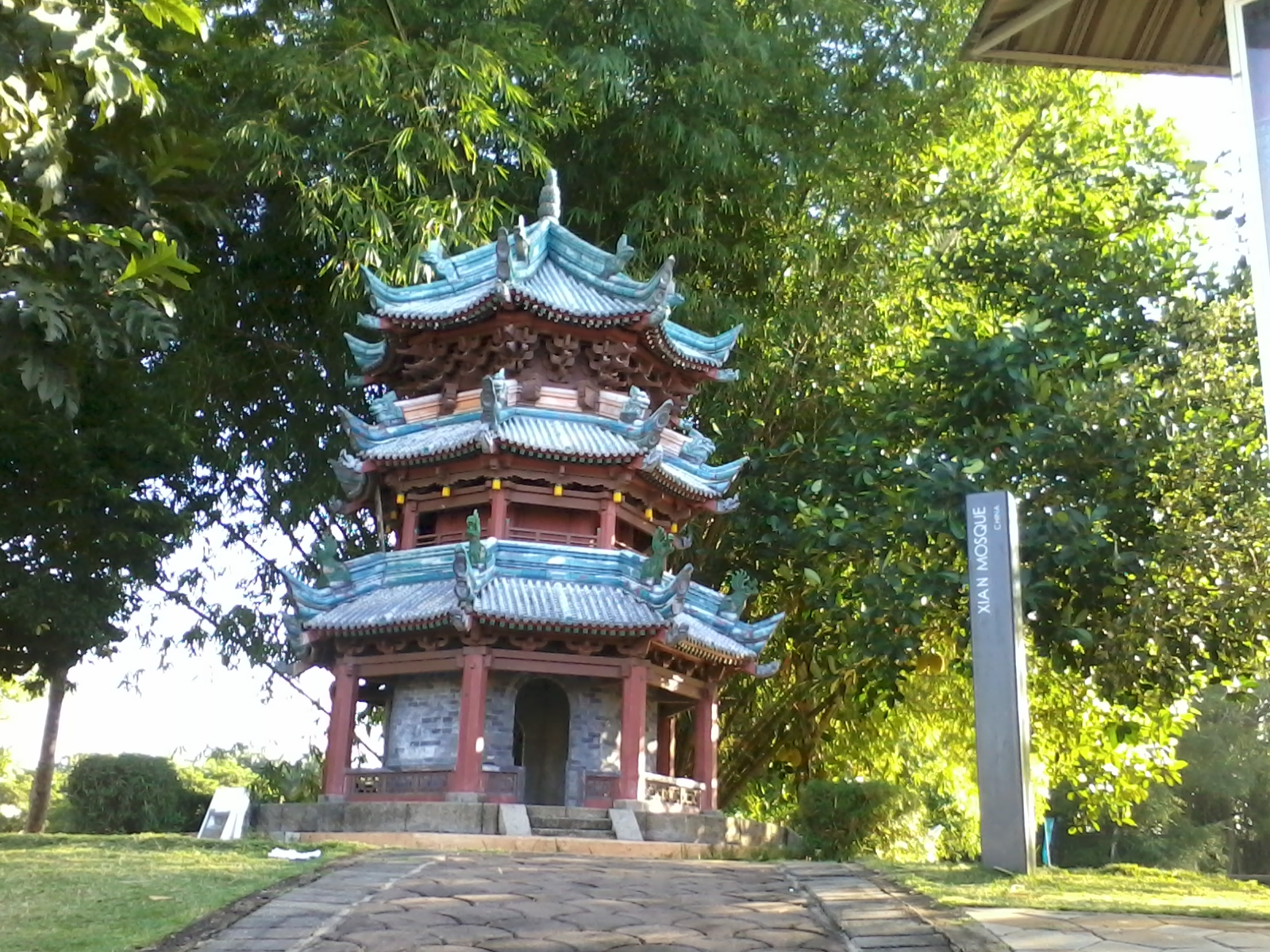
Great Mosque of Xi'an

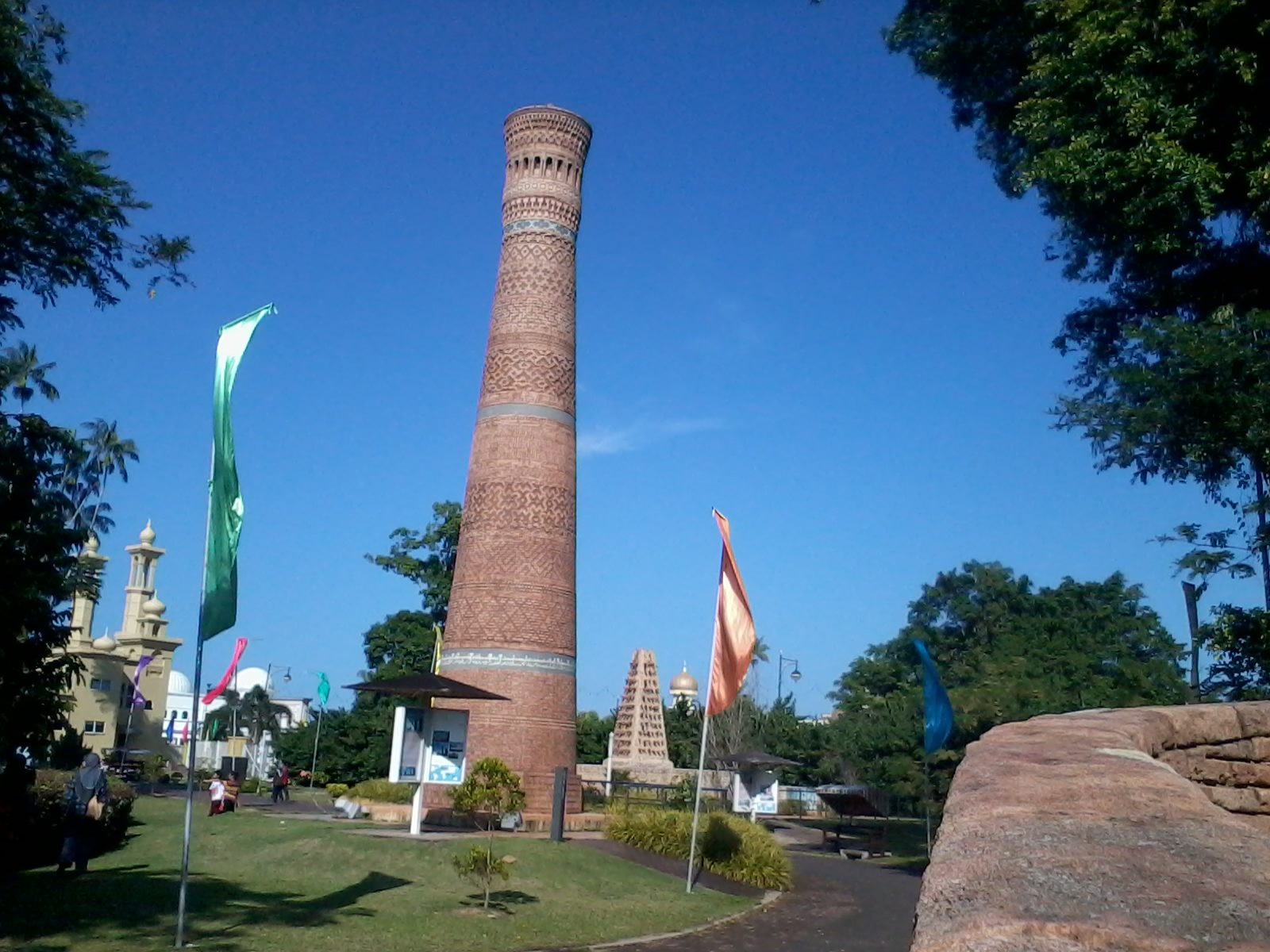
Kalyan Minaret

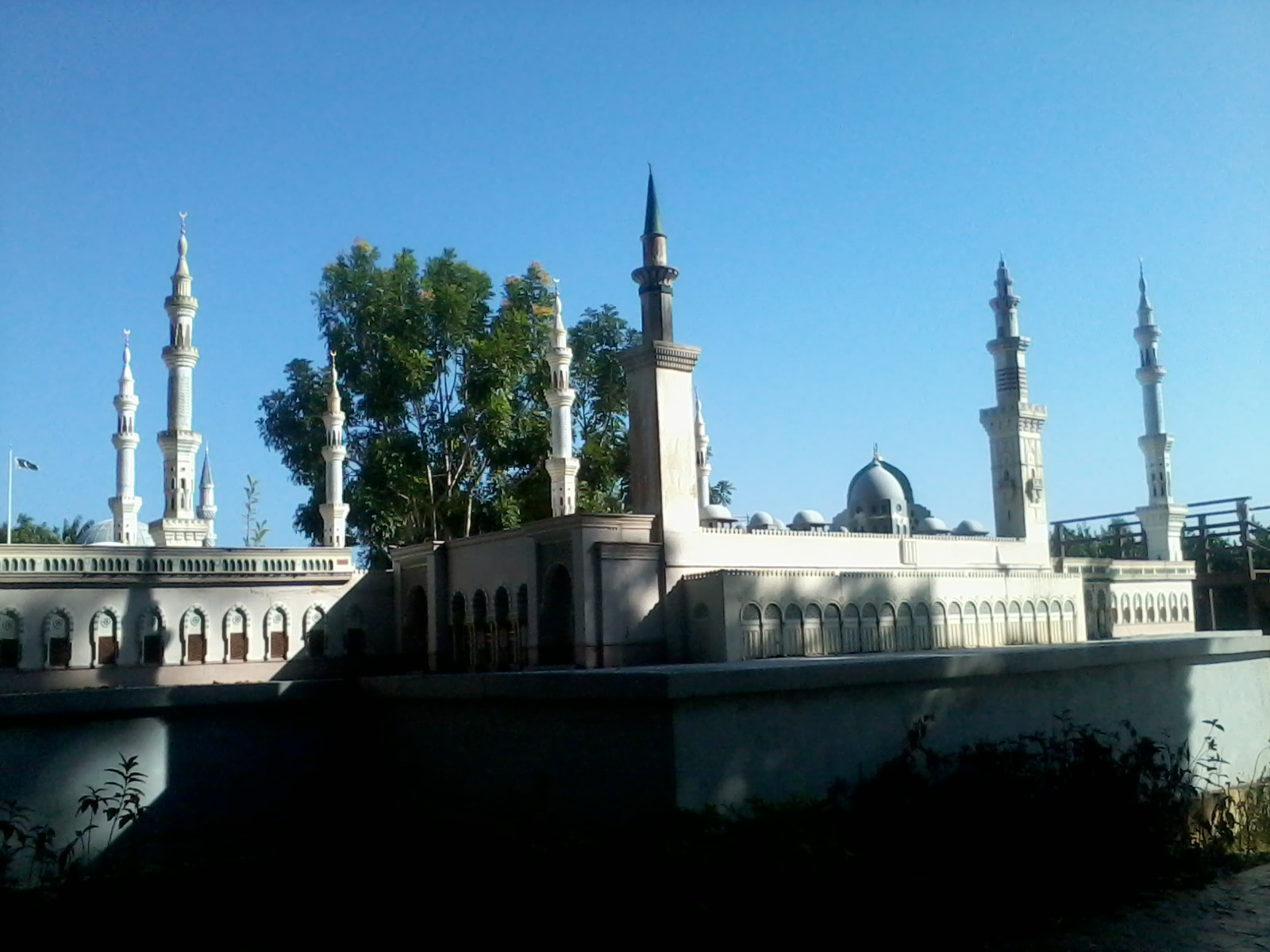
Al-Masjid al-Nabawi

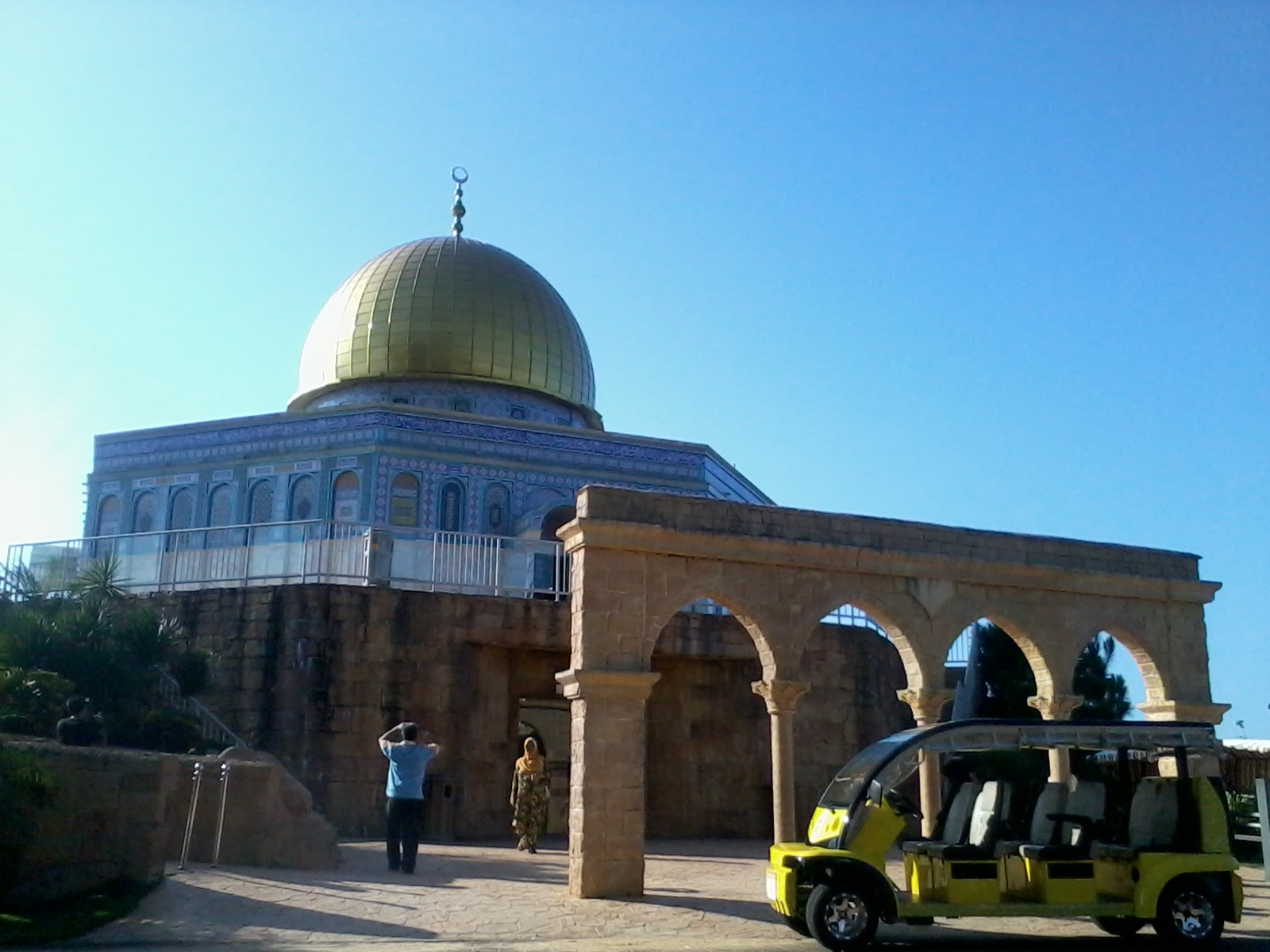
Dome of the Rock

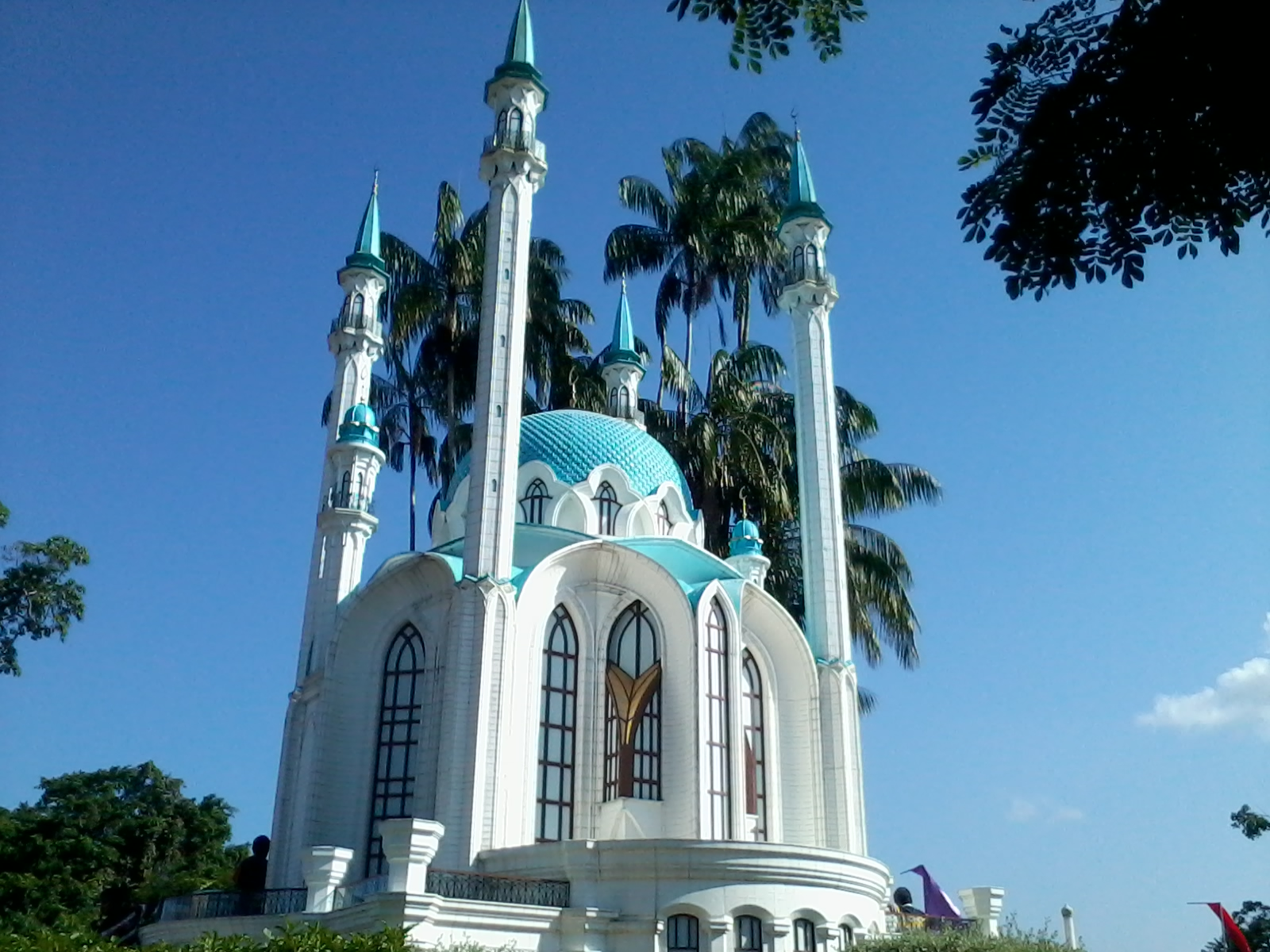
Qolsharif Mosque

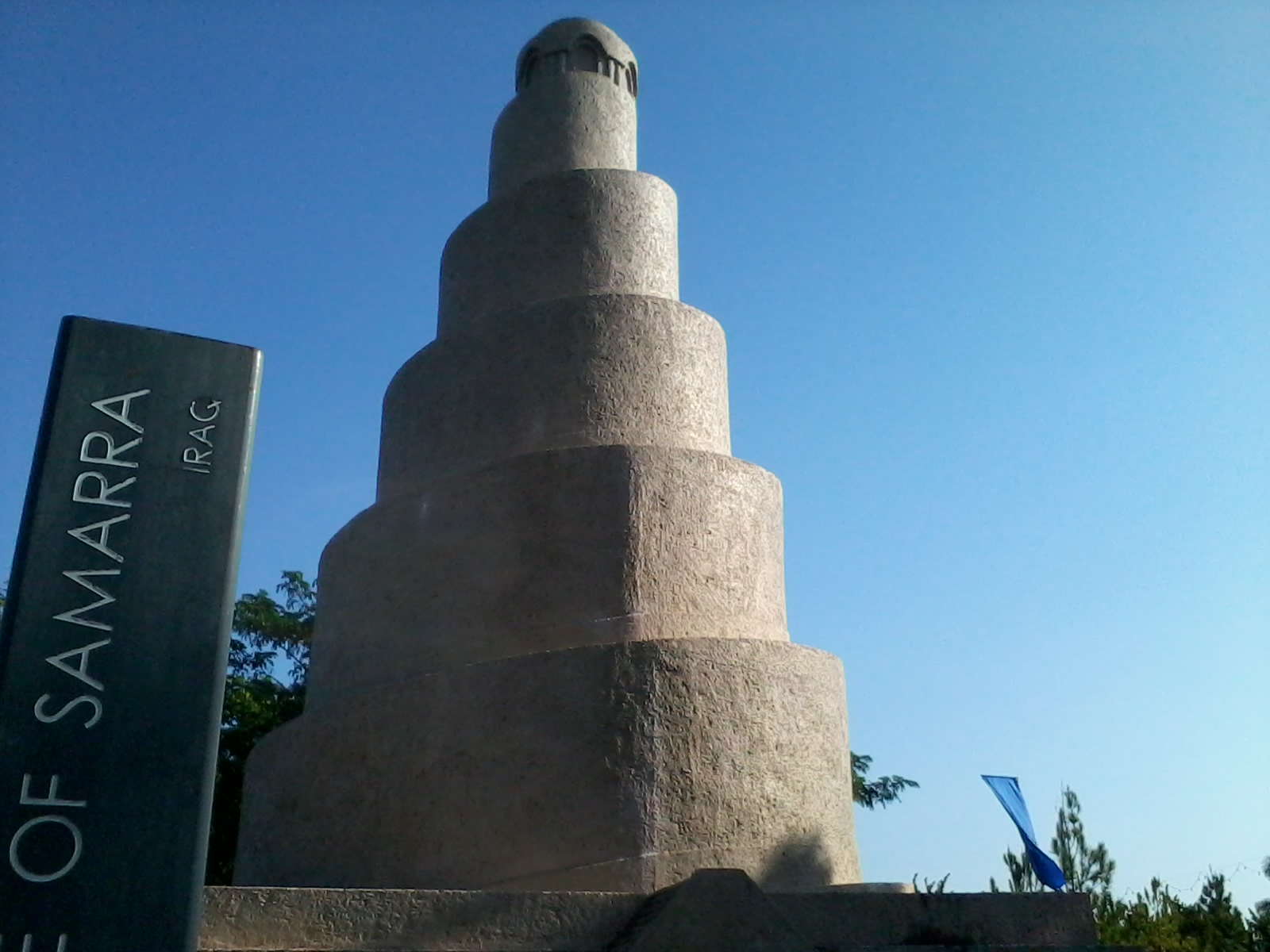
Great Mosque of Samarra

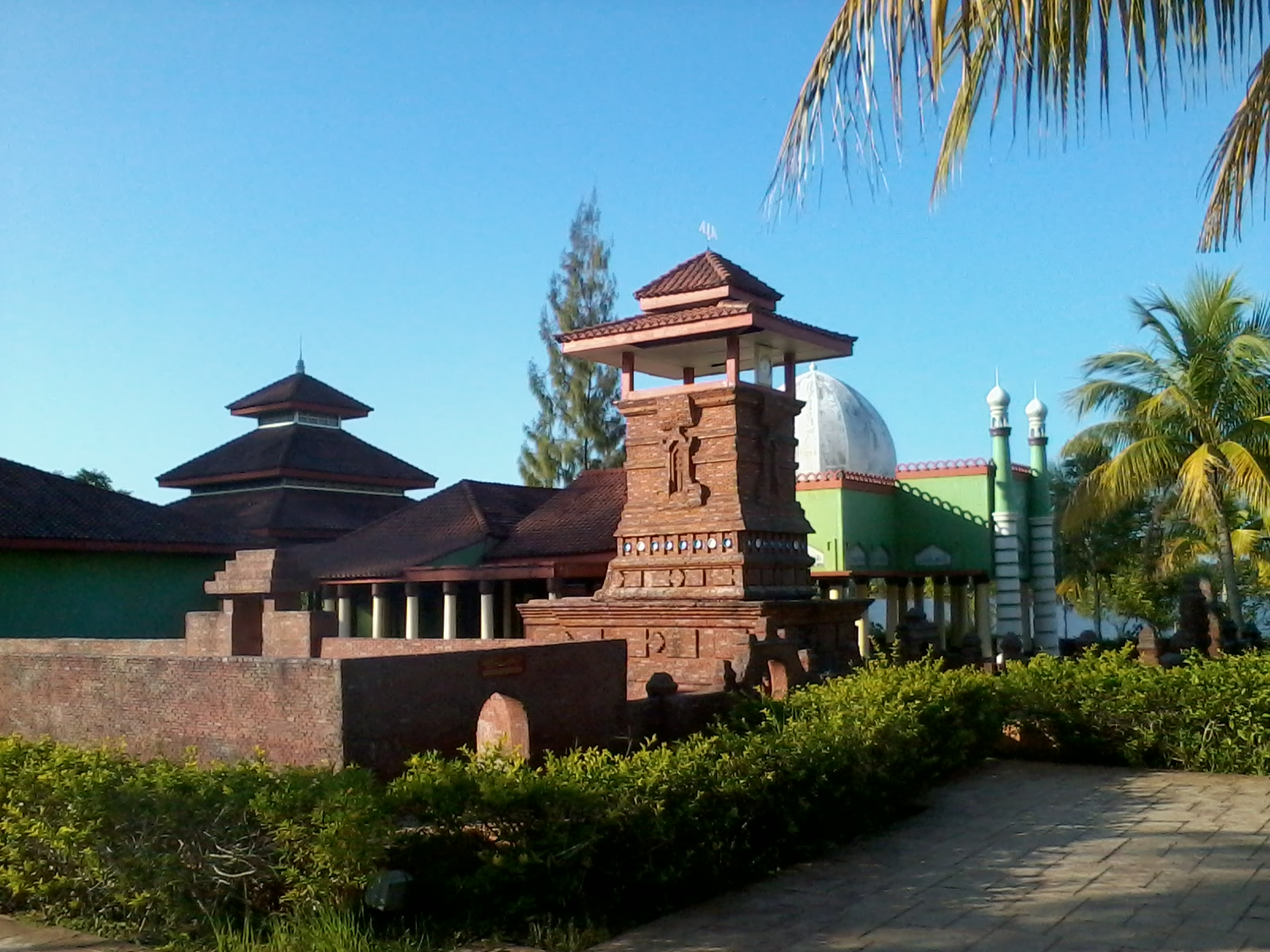
Menara Kudus Mosque

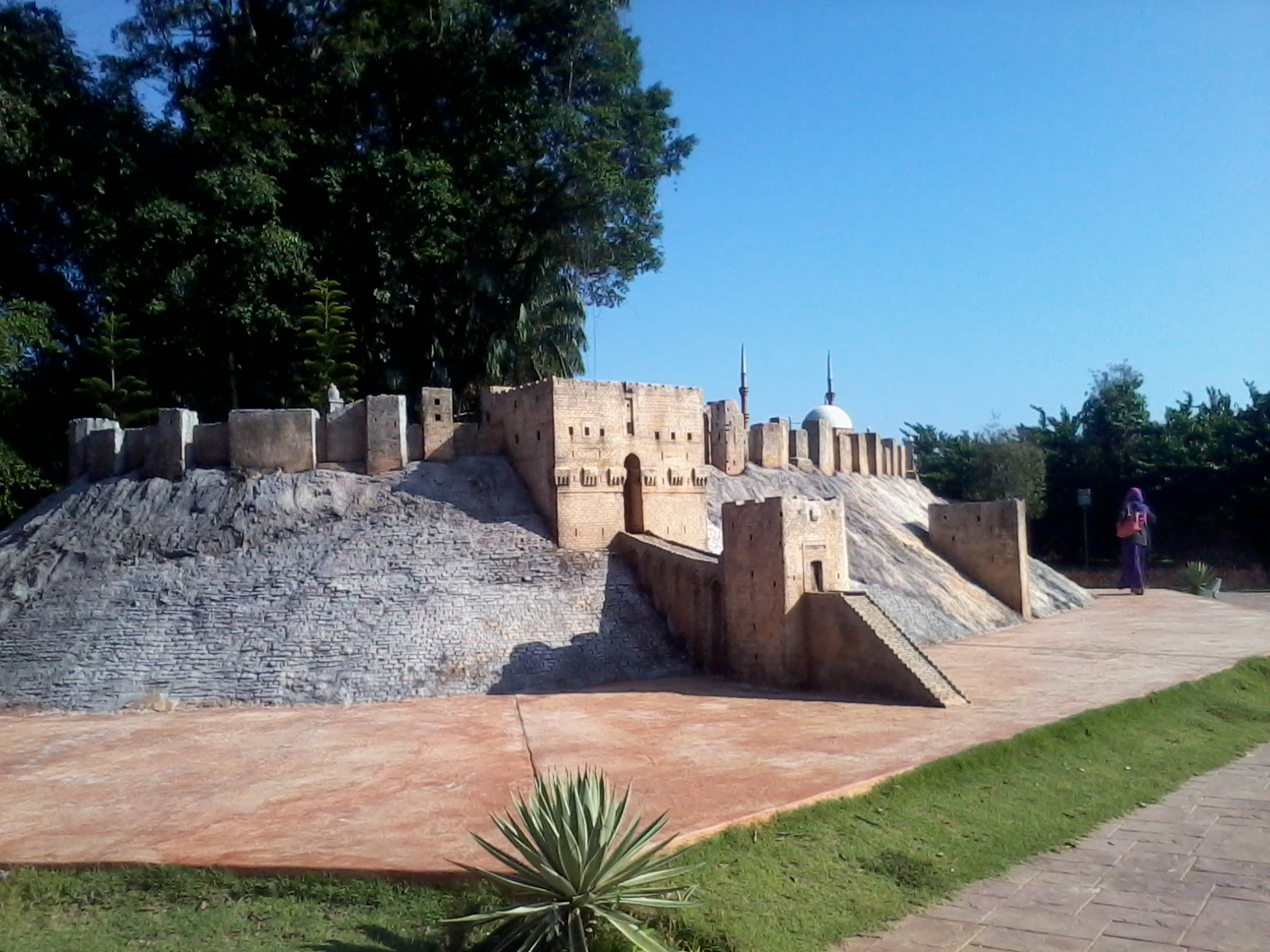
Citadel of Aleppo

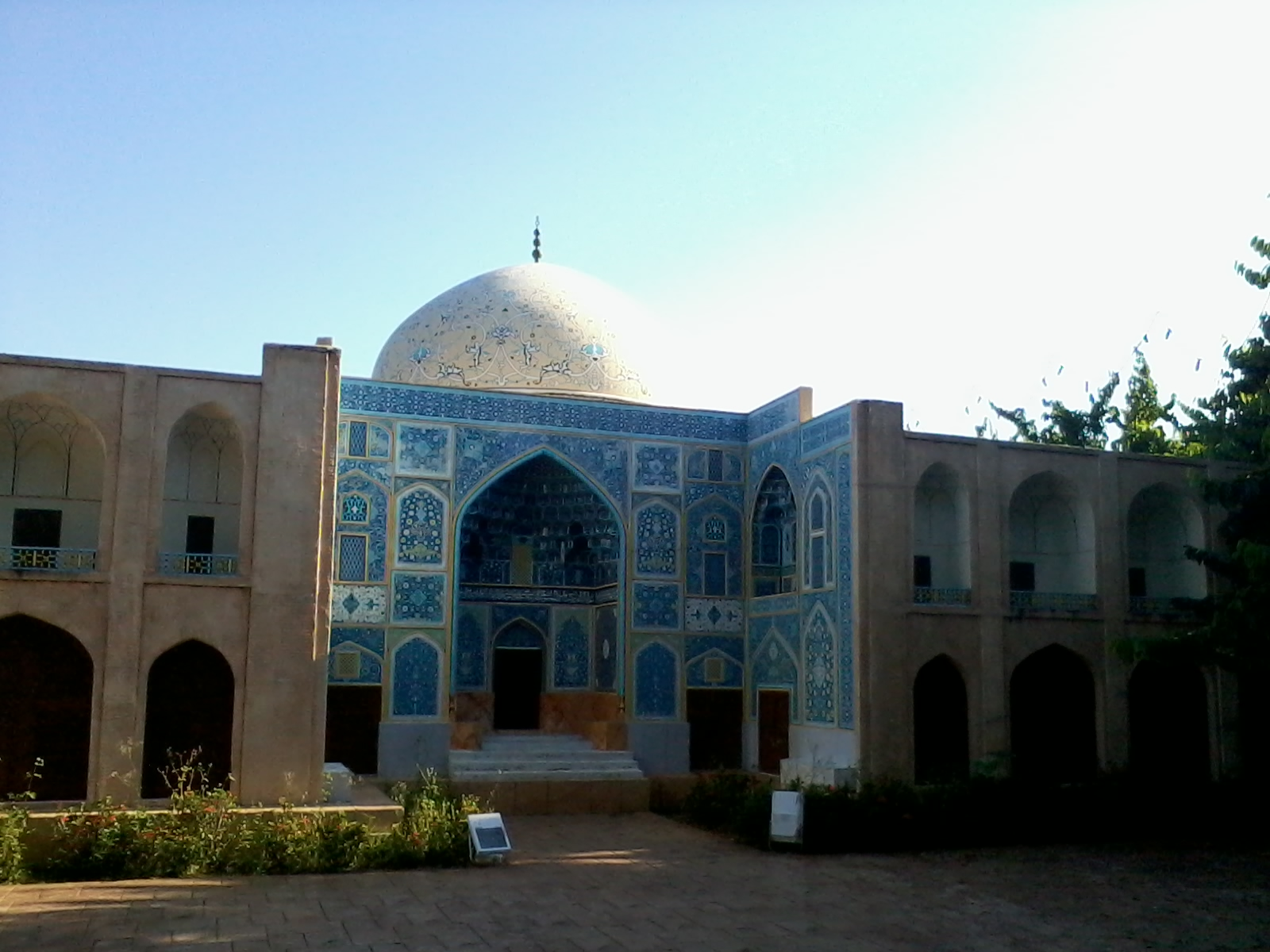
Sheikh Lotfollah Mosque

== See also ==
- List of tourist attractions in Malaysia
