= Disappearance of Sharlinie Mohd Nashar =

2008 missing person case

Sharlinie Mohd Nashar
- Born: 30 January 2004; Petaling Jaya, Selangor, Malaysia
- Disappeared: 9 January 2008; 18 years ago Petaling Jaya, Selangor, Malaysia
- Status: Missing for 18 years, 6 months and 23 days
- Other name: Nini
- Parents: Suraya Ahmad (mother); Mohd Nashar Mat Hussain (father)
- Relatives: Sharliena Mohd Nashar (sister)

The disappearance of Sharlinie Mohd Nashar occurred on 9 January 2008, in Petaling Jaya, Selangor, Malaysia. The three-year-old girl went missing after playing at a playground with her eight-year-old sister. Like Tin Song Sheng who went missing in 1996, no evidence of Sharlinie's death was ever found, nor were any kidnapping or murder charges ever filed. Her disappearance occurred not long after the Nurin Jazlin Jazimin case, three months earlier.

== Early life ==
Sharlinie, known by her nickname Nini, was born on 30 January 2004 in Petaling Jaya, Selangor to her parents Suraya Ahmad and Mohd Nashar Mat Hussain. She was the youngest of four siblings, and required salbutamol to treat her asthma.

== Disappearance ==
On 9 January 2008, Sharlinie and her eight-year-old sister Sharliena went to a playground located just 200 metres from their two-storey terrace house in PJS 2, Taman Datuk Harun, Petaling Jaya. The two of them played together for 30 minutes before the incident at 11:30 a.m.

But only Sharliena returned home that day after she failed to discover her younger sister. Her younger brother told their mother, Suraya Ahmad, about Sharlinie's disappearance. Her family then filed a police report after spending two hours searching for her at the playground. A doll belonging to Sharlinie was found by locals at the location where she was reported missing.

== Search efforts and investigation ==
The police opened an investigation into Sharlinie's disappearance and began a massive search effort to track her down. The massive searching for her conducted by the police and the public. Thousands of homes in the area were searched by authorities, but Sharlinie was never found. There were allegations that the child was tied up with candy by an unknown woman before being forced into a black car.

In addition, there were also rumours that a man, nicknamed the "cat man", had approached the girl to ask for help locating his missing cat before kidnapping her. Just two days before Sharlinie's disappearance and about two kilometres away, a six-year-old girl who was playing not far from her house was kidnapped by the same "cat man". However, about three hours later, she was found unharmed about 25 km (16 mi) away in Wangsa Maju.

The photo of the "cat man" was then widely distributed to the public. The details about the "cat man" were also revealed by witnesses and victims in other cases and attempted kidnappings. The search for Sharlinie stretched from weeks to months with hundreds of thousands of posters of the child distributed across the country. Dozens of calls, many of them hoaxes, were received by authorities and the victim's family, but failed to find any clues to Sharlinie's whereabouts.

The then-Inspector-General of Police (IGP), Musa Hassan, ordered Bukit Aman and Selangor to find Sharlinie. He said to Utusan Malaysia: "We are hunting for two suspects through sketches of their faces and will distribute them widely to print and electronic media. The police also hope that the public will come forward to help provide information as there are many stalls in the area where the incident occurred".

Sharlinie's disappearance also received a response from the then-Prime Minister, Abdullah Ahmad Badawi. He called on the kidnappers to return the girl to her family. In addition, political parties like UMNO, MIC, MCA, PAS, DAP and PKR also assisted in the case. Apart from the party leaders' visit to Sharlinie's parents' house, posters of Sharlinie's disappearance were also distributed to the public.

The police investigation discovered a rumour that Sharlinie may have been a victim of trafficking.

== See also ==
- Disappearance of Tin Song Sheng
- List of people who disappeared mysteriously (2000–present)
