= International Zakat Organization =

International charity organization

- Abbreviation: IZO
- Formation: 2008
- Founder: Government of Malaysia
- Region served: 56 member states of the Organisation of Islamic Cooperation
- Website: izakat.org/eng/About.aspx

The International Zakat Organization (IZO) is an Islamic charitable initiative which focuses on the use of Zakat. Its aim is to work in the international Islamic community among the 56 member states of the Organisation of Islamic Cooperation and in the wider world to foster cooperation in economic, social, cultural, and other areas.

== History ==
The IZO was founded in late 2008 by the Government of Malaysia. In May 2007, the Hon. Dato’ Seri Syed Hamid Albar, Minister of Foreign Affairs of Malaysia, had tabled a resolution for the formation of the International Zakat Organization at the thirty-fourth session of the Islamic Conference of Foreign Ministers of the Organisation of the Islamic Conference in Islamabad. This resolution followed the International Zakat Conference held in Kuala Lumpur in November 2006.

In early 2009, the IZO granted the mandate to manage the Global Zakat and Charity Fund to The BMB Group, chaired by Rayo Withanage. BMB Islamic, led by Dr Humayon Dar, was appointed as the fund's Sharia advisor. About RM10 billion in tithes are expected to be collected by the International Zakat Organisation (IZO) within five years.

A meeting with officials of the Organisation of the Islamic Conference for the establishment of IZO was held in Kuala Lumpur on 27 and 28 July 2010, with a ceremony for the signing of IZO's Article of Agreement expected to be held by the end of 2010.
