= LGBTQ rights in Malaysia =

- Malaysia
- Legal status: Illegal since 1871
- Penalty: Up to 20 years imprisonment with caning and fines for anal sex. Muslim citizens may also be additionally charged in an Islamic court under Sharia, and foreigners may be deported.
- Gender identity: No
- Military: No
- Discrimination protections: No

Family rights
- Recognition of relationships: No
- Adoption: No

Lesbian, gay, bisexual, transgender, and queer (LGBTQ) people in Malaysia face severe challenges not experienced by non-LGBTQ residents. Although same-sex identities alone are not criminalised under the law, (Note: Except for Muslims who are subjected to Sharia law, depending on the state they are in. See § State Shariah law for more details.) the act of sodomy (anal sex) is a crime in the country, with laws enforced arbitrarily. Extrajudicial murders of LGBTQ people have also occurred in the country. There are no Malaysian laws that protect the LGBTQ community against discrimination and hate crimes. As such, the LGBTQ demographic in the country are hard to ascertain due to widespread fears from being ostracised and prosecuted, including violence.

In 2015, the Human Rights Watch (HRW) stated that "Discrimination against lesbian, gay, bisexual, and transgender (LGBT) people is pervasive in Malaysia." Over the years, there have also been cases of violence against individuals in Malaysia based on their sexual orientation, which has been tolerated by the state. Conversion therapy is practiced regularly in the country and is openly promoted by politicians and religious leaders. In 2023, the Global Trans Rights Index ranked Malaysia as the second worst country in the world in terms of transgender rights, only after Guyana.

With widespread anti-LGBTQ conversion therapy practices, discrimination, and violence in the country supported by the state, Malaysia is one of the most homophobic countries in the world. Social attitudes towards the LGBTQ community in the country are largely shaped by Islam, the official state religion of Malaysia, although a significant proportion of Malaysians of other religions such as Christianity also holds strong homophobic views. Since at least the 19th century, the mores of Malaysia have strongly disapproved of same-sex relationships and transitioning, which has shaped public policy. As a result, LGBTQ rights are not pursued by any political party.

== History ==
=== 19th and 20th centuries ===
Malaysia retains its criminal ban on sodomy (anal sex or oral sex involving the penis) under Section 377A of the Penal Code, which was enacted in 1871 when it was under British colonial rule (British Malaya). It is broadly defined to include both heterosexual and homosexual acts, regardless of the gender of both parties involved, with possible punishments including fines, caning, and prison sentences of up to twenty years. Section 377D of the Penal Code also criminalises "act of gross indecency with another person" with up to two years imprisonment, which applies to both males and females since 1989. In addition to the secular law, Muslim citizens may also be charged in special Islamic courts, however non-Muslim are not subjected to Islamic law and the Islamic courts have no jurisdiction over non-Muslims, as enshrined in the Federal Constitution of Malaysia.

There has been some public discussion about reforming the law so as to exempt private, non-commercial sexual acts between consenting adults. Some members of the major opposition party have expressed support for such a reform, most notably Latheefa Koya, but this is not the official position of the party. No political party or elected member of the Parliament has formally proposed such a reform.

In 1975, a Malay Muslim transgender woman, Sari Kartina binti Abdul Karim (formerly named Mohd Fauzi bin Abdul Karim), who had undergone a sex reassingment surgery conducted by S.S. Ratnam at the Kandang Kerbau Hospital in Singapore back in October 1974, was allowed by the Johor Deputy Mufti Syed Alwee Abdullah to marry her husband Abdul Razak Othman in Johor Bahru and have their marriage recognised under sharia law. She also successfully changed her identity card with the National Registration Department, which recognised her as a female. Sari Kartina is considered to be the first ever transgender Malay and Muslim to be allowed to marry under the sharia law in Malaysia.

In 1982, the National Fatwa Committee issued a fatwa (religious edict) banning Muslims from undergoing sexual reassingment surgery, unless one is an intersex person. The fatwa reiterated that a person's sex is determined at birth and remains so even one has successfully undergone a sexual reassingment surgery. It also ruled that marriages involving transgender are invalid. However, this ruling is not legally binding as it was not gazetted under any law.

In 1993, Kelantan passed Syariah Criminal Code (II) Enactment 1993 that stipulated the implementation of hudud law, including for same-sex sexual acts. However, following backlash by Sisters in Islam and letter to then Prime Minister, Mahathir Mohammad, the code remains unenforceable. In 2015, Kelantan re-enacted this shariah criminal code so that non-Muslims are fully exempt from the law, however its provisions are still unenforceable due to the limits set by Act 355.

In 1994, the government banned anyone who is homosexual, bisexual or transsexual from appearing in state-controlled media.

In 1995, the Religious Affairs Minister of the state of Selangor praised the Islamic Badar vigilante groups, who had organised in 1994, to assist in the arrest of 7,000 individuals for engaging in "unIslamic" activities such as homosexuality.

=== 21st century ===
In 2002, Terengganu passed Syariah Criminal Offenses (Hudud And Qisas) Enactment 2002 which stipulated the imposition of hudud law including for same-sex sexual acts, but this law remained unenforceable due to the limits set out by Act 355.

In 2005, the Royal Malaysian Navy (RMN) chief Mohd Anwar Mohd Nor stated that the Navy would never accept homosexuals.

In 2010, the Film Censorship Board of Malaysia announced it would only allow depiction of homosexual characters as long as the characters "repent" or "go straight" in the end.

In 2016, the High Court affirmed the right of a post-transition transgender man to reassign his gender on his national registration identity card. The judgement was however overturned on appeal the following year.

In 2017, Malaysia tried to censor Beauty and the Beast over some gay moments but eventually relented and let the movie be shown. The censorship board also had no objections to the screening of Power Rangers even with a lesbian scene in the movie.

In May 2017, the LGBTQ pride march organised by Taylor's University planned in June was cancelled due to Islamist pressure. The event was condemned by pro-Islamist blogs because it was disrespectful to do in the Islamic holy month of Ramadan.

In August 2018, a gay bar in the capital Kuala Lumpur was raided by police and religious enforcement officials, while in a separate incident, a transgender woman was beaten up by a group of assailants in Seremban, a town south of Kuala Lumpur. The minister in charge of Islamic affairs also came under fire from activists and other ruling party lawmakers, after he ordered the removal of portraits of two LGBTQ activists from an art exhibition.

In September 2018, two Muslim women were convicted by the Terengganu Shariah High Court for attempting to have lesbian sex in a car parked in public area, and were fined 3,300 Malaysian ringgit and caned six times in shariah-style caning before an audience in a courtroom of the Terengganu Shariah High Court. Prime Minister Mahathir Mohamad denounced the punishment, saying it "did not reflect the justice or compassion of Islam".

In November 2019, a shariah court found five Muslim men guilty for "attempting" gay sex, under section 28 of Selangor's sharia law, and they received fines, imprisonment and six strokes of the cane each. The five men were arrested during a 2018 raid on a private residence in Selangor, in which a total of 11 men were arrested.

In 2020, local rock band Bunkface stirred controversy over homophobic lyrics in their song Akhir Zaman ("The End of Times"). The lyrics urge the LGBT community to "go and die". The band issued a statement on Instagram on March 6, 2020, where they referred to the Quran to defend their anti-LGBT lyrics.

In 2021, one of the Muslim man who was arrested on sodomy charges under Selangor's shariah law in the November 2019 case filed a lawsuit against the state government of Selangor. Subsequently, the Federal Court of Malaysia declared that the Islamic provision banning gay sex in Selangor is unconstitutional, and any state laws within Malaysia can not be in conflict or override with clear federal laws banning gay sex.

In 2022, Malaysian authorities raided a Halloween party, arresting dozens of participants that were a part of the LGBTQ+ community. Numan Afifi, an LGBTQ rights activist who was among those arrested, referred to it as "outrageous state oppression".

In 2023, Malaysian authorities seized rainbow-coloured watches made by Swatch from its Pride collection. Eleven shopping malls with Swatch outlets around Malaysia, including in the capital Kuala Lumpur, were raided in May. However, on 24 June 2023, Swatch filed a lawsuit against the Malaysian government. On 25 November 2024, the Kuala Lumpur High Court ruled that the seizure conducted by the Home Ministry was illegal, as it was done without warrant and was carried out before the prohibition order was issued. The court subsequently ordered all 172 seized watches to be returned to Swatch, and all watches were eventually returned to Swatch by the Home Ministry on 9 December 2024.

In July 2023, English pop rock band The 1975 was forced by the organisers of Good Vibes Festival to prematurely end their performance after their lead vocalist Matty Healy criticised the country's widespread anti-LGBTQ laws and kissed bandmate Ross MacDonald. Healy added that they initially did not want to visit Malaysia, stating that "I made a mistake. When we were booking shows, I wasn't looking into it," he said. "I don't see the fucking point... of inviting The 1975 to a country and then telling us who we can have sex with." Human rights and LGBTQ activist Peter Tatchell, writing for The Guardian wrote that criticism of Healy and the band "deflect attention from where the criticisms should be most urgently directed: against the homophobia of the Kuala Lumpur regime." He also expressed that Healy is no white saviour for showing solidarity to the community as "queer rights are a universal human right, not a western one". That same month, 8 individuals were arrested by the police in Kuala Lumpur for staging a demonstration supporting LGBTQ rights.

In February 2024, the Federal Court of Malaysia in Nik Elin Zurina bt Nik Abdul Rashid & Anor v. Kerajaan Negeri Kelantan, struck down 16 Sharia-based Kelantan state laws; parts of which covered incest, sodomy, and cross-dressing. However, this ruling does not affect anti-LGBTQ laws at the federal level.

In November 2024, the Kelantan state approved its amendments to its entertainment law, banning entertainment activities that promote or contain unethical elements, such as supporting LGBTQ behaviour.

In February 2026, the Malaysian Communications and Multimedia Commission (MCMC) blocked access to the websites of same-sex dating platforms Grindr and Blued. In a written response to the Parliament of Malaysia, Communications Minister Fahmi Fadzil clarified that while the web-based versions were restricted immediately, the government was still evaluating legal measures to remove the mobile applications from the Apple App Store and Google Play Store in Malaysia.

In June 2026, Deputy Minister for Religious Affairs Marhamah Rosli said it was now the government's official position to urge the public to say “budaya songsang” (“perverted/deviant culture”) instead of "LGBT."

== Legislation prohibiting or restricting LGBTQ ==
=== Federal criminal law ===
Malaysia's federal law applies to all person within Malaysia, regardless of their religion or nationality. One such federal law is the Penal Code, which although did not specifically criminalise same-sex identities or same-sex relationships, did prohibit and penalise homosexual intercourse. Another piece of federal legislation, the Printing Presses and Publications Act 1984, has also been used to ban publications or items relating to LGBTQ on the grounds of immorality.

==== Penal Code ====
Section 377A of the Penal Code, under the heading "Carnal intercourse against the order of nature", criminalise the act of anal sex or oral sex between two consensual persons, for which the punishment are up to 20 years imprisonment and whipping. This section is also generally referred to as the "anti-gay law" or "sodomy law" of Malaysia, although it is gender-neutral and does not discern between genders or sexual orientations of the person involved.

Section 377C of the Penal Code also punishes non-consensual or forced anal sex or oral sex between two persons, for which the punishment is minimum 5 years imprisonment to maximum 20 years imprisonment, and also whipping.

Lesbian sex is not specifically criminalised under the Penal Code or any other federal law, but some groups have fear it may fall under Section 377D, which criminalise "act of gross indecency with another person", for which the punishment is up to 2 years imprisonment. However, what constitute "act of gross indecency" is unclear and undefined by the Penal Code itself, and past court cases have indicated that it is left for the court to decide or based on "morals of the general public".

[...] s. 377D of the Penal Code deals with any act of gross indecency involving any person, and it can be between male persons, between female persons, or between male and female persons. As to what act constitutes indecency or gross indecency, the legislature itself has seen it fit not to give it a definition, but has left it entirely to the court to determine. It is not possible to define what is indecent or grossly indecent act. As the High Court judge in this case had stated in his judgment - "Every person may have a different view of what is indecent. Our individual perception of what is indecent depends upon our upbringing, which includes religious, cultural and family values." [...]

— Chief Justice Eusoff Chin, Sukma Darmawan Sasmitaat Madja v. Ketua Pengarah Penjara Malaysia & Anor, [1999] 2 CLJ 707

Majority of cases prosecuted under Section 377D are non-violent sexual assault, flashing, public masturbation or public sex. As of August 2025, there's no known case of lesbian being charged under Section 377D for having lesbian sex.

==== Printing Presses and Publications Act 1984 ====
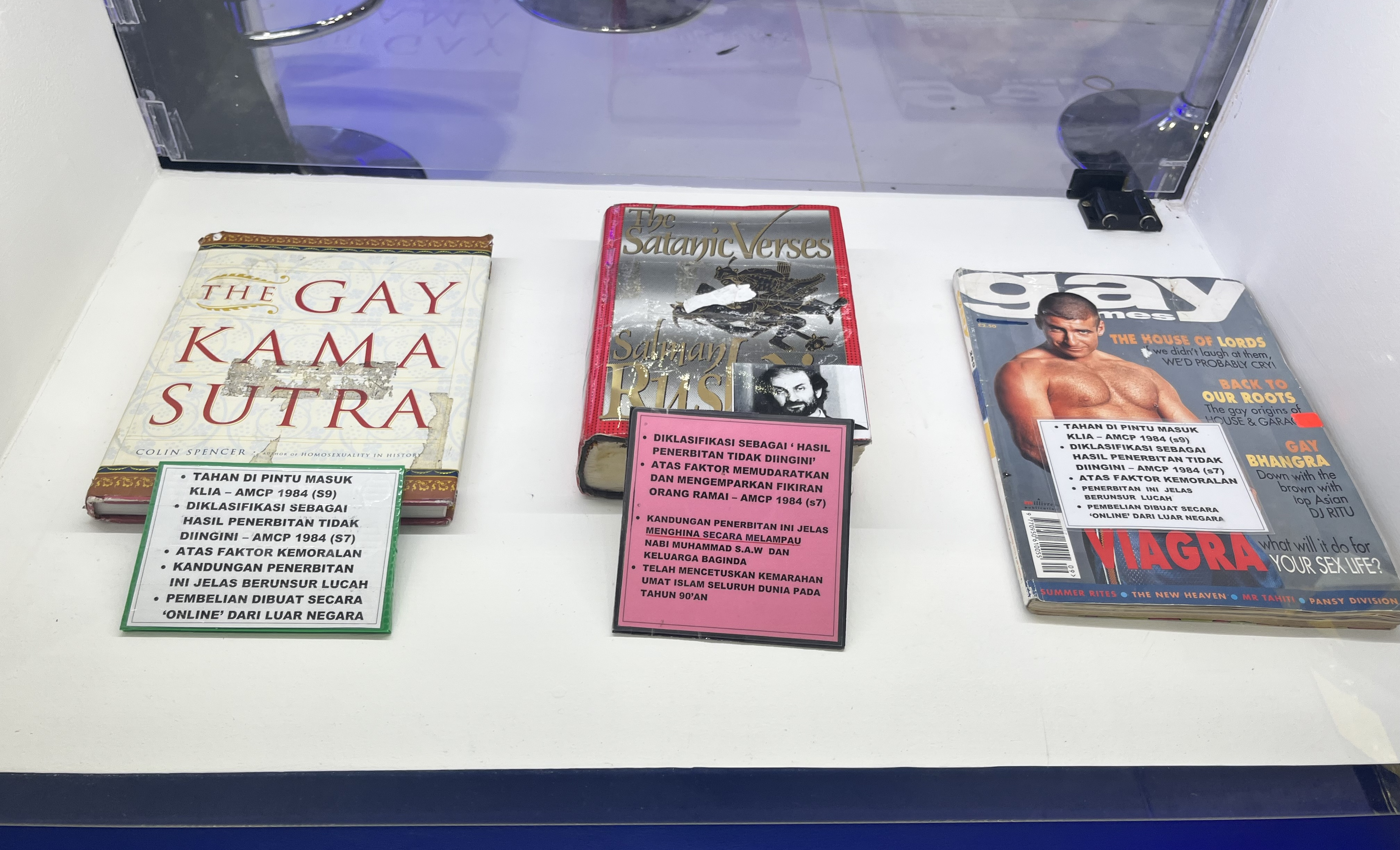
Gay books (left and right) detained at KLIA and banned under the Printing Presses and Publications Act 1984 by the Home Ministry on display during an exhibit held at KL Convention Centre.

Printing Presses and Publications Act 1984, or PPPA, is a piece of federal legislation that is often used by the Malaysian government to ban and censor books or items relating to LGBTQ in Malaysia.

Section 7 of the PPPA allows the Home Minister by an order in the Gazette to prohibit the printing, importation, production, reproduction, publishing, sale, issue, circulation, distribution or possession of any "undesirable publications" in Malaysia on the grounds of "prejudicial to public order, morality, security, or which is likely to alarm public opinion, or which is or is likely to be contrary to any law or is otherwise prejudicial to public interest or national interest". Anyone who without lawful excuse owns a prohibited publication may be punished with up to RM5,000 fine; while anyone who prints, publishes, sells, or distribute a prohibited publication can be punished with maximum 3 years imprisonment or up to RM20,000 fine.

Majority of LGBTQ-related books are often banned on the grounds of "prejudicial to morality", such as Gay is Okay! A Christian Perspective by Ngeo Boon Lin (banned in 2020); Heartstopper Volume 2 by Alice Oseman and Cekik by Ridhwan Saidi (banned in 2022); The Tale of Steven by Rebecca Sugar, Jacob's Room to Choose by Sarah and Ian Hoffman, and Aku by Shaz Johar (banned in 2023).

In May 2023, some 172 Pride Collection watches sold by Swatch were seized under the PPPA by the Home Ministry for containing "LGBTQ elements" in a nationwide raid. Subsequently, an order under Section 7 of the PPPA was issued by the Home Minister in August 2023, formally banning the LGBTQ watches throughout the country. However, Swatch filed a lawsuit to challenge the validity of the raid, and the seizure of the watches was later declared illegal by the Kuala Lumpur High Court as the warrantless seizure was done before the watches were gazetted and banned under Section 7 of the PPPA. The court subsequently ordered all 172 seized watches to be returned to Swatch within 14 days. On 9 December 2024, the last day of the 14-days dateline, the Home Ministry returned all 172 watches back to Swatch.

Section 9 of the PPPA also allows the Home Minister to restrict and detain any foreign publications from being imported into Malaysia on the same grounds as described in Section 7.

=== State Shariah law ===
State Shariah law, in contrast to federal criminal law, only applies to Muslims and have no jurisdiction over non-Muslims, as guarateed by Item 1, Ninth Schedule of the Federal Constitution of Malaysia. Shariah law is not legislated by the federal Parliament, but instead by the State Legislative Assembly of each individual state in Malaysia (except the federal territories), as Islamic affairs falls under the autonomy of a state. Therefore, shariah laws are state laws and the offences contained within them may differs from state to state.

In all 13 states and 3 federal territories of Malaysia, there are shariah law provisions in place that prohibit or restrict homosexual intercourse or gender expression of Muslim LGBTQ community in varying degrees, majority of which are often loosely defined and gender specific, unlike the Penal Code at the federal level. In addition to that, some of the shariah law provisions in certain states have also been declared null and void by the Federal Court of Malaysia as they have intrude into the legislative powers of the federal Parliament and have violated the Federal Constitution.

The following table is a summary of LGBTQ-related offences under the shariah law of every state in Malaysia:

State	Is the following an offence under the state shariah law?						
State	Musahaqah	Liwat	Sexual intercourse against the order of nature	Sexual relations between persons of the same gender	Attempt to commit liwat	Male person posing as female	Female person posing as male
Federal Territories	Yes	Yes	—	—	—	Yes	—
Johor	Yes	Yes	—	—	—	Yes	—
Kedah	Yes	Yes	—	—	—	Yes	—
Kelantan	Yes	Yes (Note: Declared unconstitutional and invalid by Federal Court in Nik Elin v. Kelantan in 2024.)	—	—	Yes	Yes	Yes
Malacca	Yes	Yes	Yes	—	Yes	Yes	—
Negeri Sembilan	Yes	Yes	Yes	—	—	Yes	Yes
Pahang	—	—	—	—	—	Yes	Yes
Penang	Yes	Yes	—	—	—	Yes	—
Perak	Yes	—	—	—	—	Yes	—
Perlis	Yes	Yes	—	—	—	Yes	Yes
Selangor	—	—	Yes (Note: Declared unconstitutional and invalid by Federal Court in Iki Putra Mubarrak v. Kerajaan Negeri Selangor & Anor in 2021.)	Yes	—	Yes	—
Sabah	Yes	Yes	Yes	—	—	Yes	Yes
Sarawak	Yes	Yes	—	—	—	Yes	—
Terengganu	Yes	—	—	—	Yes	Yes	Yes

==== Federal Territories (Kuala Lumpur, Labuan, and Putrajaya) ====
In the Federal Territories of Kuala Lumpur, Labuan, and Putrajaya, shariah law is legislated by the federal Parliament instead of a State Legislative Assembly. Under the Syariah Criminal Offences (Federal Territories) Act 1997 [Act 559], liwat (sodomy) and musahaqah (lesbian sex) are criminalised under Section 25 and 26 of the Act, and both offences are punishable with up to RM5,000 fine, up to 3 years imprisonment, or up to 6 strokes of whipping, or any combination thereof.

Under the Act, liwat is simply defined as "sexual relations between male persons" while musahaqah is simply defined as "sexual relations between female persons".

A woman convicted of musahaqah may also, in replacement of or in addition to her sentence, be ordered by the Islamic court to be committed to an approved home for up to 6 months under Section 56 of the Act.

The act of a male person posing as a woman in public "for immoral purposes" is also punishable under Section 28 of the same Act with maximum RM1,000 fine, or maximum 1 year imprisonment, or both. However, female cross-dressing as male is not criminalised under the Act.

==== Johor ====
Under the Syariah Criminal Offences Enactment 1997 [En.4/1997] in Johor, liwat (sodomy) and musahaqah (lesbian sex) are criminalised under Section 25 and 26 of the Enactment respectively, for which the punishment is up to RM5,000 fine, up to 3 years imprisonment, or up to 6 strokes of whipping, or any combination thereof.

Under the Enactment, liwat is simply defined as "sexual relations between male persons" while musahaqah is simply defined as "sexual relations between female persons".

Section 28 of the same Enactment also criminalises the act of a male cross-dressing as a female in public "for immoral purpose", for which the punishment is up to RM1,000 fine or up to 1 year imprisonment, or both. However, female cross-dressing as male is not criminalised under Johor's shariah law.

==== Kedah ====
Under the Syariah Criminal Offences (Kedah Darul Aman) Enactment 2014 [En.18/2014], liwat (sodomy) and musahaqah (lesbian sex) are criminalised under Section 23 and 24 of the Enactment respectively, for which the punishment is up to RM5,000 fine, up to 3 years imprisonment, or up to 6 strokes of whipping, or any combination thereof.

Under the Enactment, liwat is defined as "unusual sexual intercourse between a man and a man or between a man and a woman" while musahaqah is simply defined as "sexual relations between female persons".

A woman convicted of musahaqah may also, in replacement of or in addition to her sentence, be ordered by the Islamic court to be committed to an approved home for up to 6 months under Section 52 of the Enactment.

A male person posing as a woman in public is also criminalised under Section 26 of the Enactment, for which the punishment is up to RM1,000 fine or up to 1 year imprisonment, or both. However, female person posing as a male is not criminalised under the Enactment.

==== Kelantan ====
In Kelantan, one of the most conservative states in Malaysia, the main piece of shariah criminal legislation is the controversial Syariah Criminal Code (I) Enactment 2019 [Enactment 14].

Section 14 of the law criminalised sodomy or attempted sodomy, for which the punishment is up to RM5,000 fine, up to 3 years imprisonment, or up to 6 strokes of whipping, or any combination thereof. In the Enactment, sodomy is defined as "sexual intercourse performed unnaturally which is through the anus between a man with someone else".

Section 15 also punishes musahaqah with up to RM5,000 fine, up to 3 years imprisonment, or up to 6 strokes of whipping, while attempted musahaqah may be subjected to maximum RM5,000 fine or maximum 3 years imprisonment, or both. Under the Kelantan Enactment, musahaqah is specifically defined as "an act of satisfying sexual desire between woman and woman by rubbing vagina with vagina between each other or any physical activity between woman and woman that would amount to sexual act as if it is made between a man and a woman".

Changing one's gender is also criminalised under Section 18 of the Enactment, which is punishable with maximum RM3,000 fine or maximum 2 years imprisonment, or both.

Male posing as female, or female posing as male, either in public or in a private place publicly visible or accessible, are also criminalised under Section 19 and 20 of the Enactment respectively, for which the punishment for both offences are up to RM3,000 fine or up to 2 years imprisonment, or both. Additionally, persons convicted for cross-dressing offences may also be subjected to community service, or "counselling" and "rehabilitation" session in a religious institution for not more than 6 months.

In February 2024, the Federal Court in a landmark decision in Nik Elin v. Kelantan ruled that Section 14 (which criminalised sodomy) and 16 other provisions of the Kelantan Enactment are invalid, null, and void, as they have violated the Constitution and the Kelantan State Legislative Assembly have impinged into the areas where only the federal Parliament have powers to make laws on.

==== Malacca ====
Under Enakmen Kesalahan Syariah (Negeri Melaka) 1991 [En.6/1991], liwat or attempted liwat are criminalised under Section 56 and 57 of the Enactment, for which the punishment for both offences is up to RM5,000 fine, or up to 3 years imprisonment, or both. Musahaqah is also criminalised under Section 59, which is punishable with up to RM1,000 fine, or up to 6 months imprisonment, or both.

Under the Malacca Enactment, liwat is simply defined as "homosexual relations in between males", while musahaqah is simply defined as "lesbian relations in between females".

Additionally, Section 58 also criminalised "sexual intercourse against the order of nature" of any person with another man, woman, or animal, for which the punishment is up to RM5,000 fine, up to 3 years imprisonment, or up to 6 strokes of whipping, or any combination thereof. As to what constitutes "sexual intercourse against the order of nature", it is not defined by the Enactment itself.

A male person posing as a female in a public place "without reasonable ground" is also criminalised under Section 72 of the Enactment and can be punished with maximum RM1,000 fine, or maximum 6 months imprisonment, or both. However, female cross-dressing as a male is not criminalised under the shariah law of Malacca.

==== Negeri Sembilan ====
Under the Syariah Criminal (Negeri Sembilan) Enactment 1992 [En.4/1992], liwat and musahakah are criminalised under Section 63 and 64 of the Enactment and are punishable with up to RM3,000 fine, or up to 2 years imprisonment, or both.

In the Enactment, liwat is simply defined as "sexual relations between a man and a man", while musahakah is simply defined as "sexual relations between a woman and a woman".

Additionally, "sexual intercourse against the order of nature" by anyone with another man, woman, or animal is criminalised under Section 65 and can be punished with up to RM3,000 fine, or up to 2 years imprisonment, or both. The Negeri Sembilan Enactment did not define what constitutes as "sexual intercourse against the order of nature".

Man posing as a woman in public place, and since 2019, "for the purpose of any immoral act", is also punishable under Section 66 with up to RM3,000 fine, or up to 2 years imprisonment, or both.

In November 2014, the Court of Appeal in a judicial review filed by three Muslim men diagnosed with gender identity disorder ruled that Section 66 of the Negeri Sembilan Enactment is unconstitutional and invalid as it violates the fundamental liberties protected by the Federal Constitution. However, this ruling was overturned by the Federal Court in 2015 on grounds of procedural errors.

In 2019, Section 66 was amended in concurrence with the spirit of 2014 Court of Appeal decision by adding the words "for the purpose of any immoral act" into Section 66, thereby restricting its application only to action that can be considered as "immoral act". The 2019 amendment also added a new Section 66A which criminalised the act of a female posing as man in public "for immoral purpose", with the same punishment as Section 66.

==== Pahang ====
Under the Syariah Criminal Offences Enactment 2013 [Enactment 11] in Pahang, the act of a man posing as a woman, or a woman posing as a man in public "for immoral purposes" are criminalised under Section 33 and 34 of the Enactment, where both offences are punishable with up to RM1,000 fine, or up to 1 year imprisonment, or both. Muslims convicted of cross-dressing may also, in replacement of or in addition to their sentence, be ordered by the Islamic court to undergo "counselling" or "rehabilitation" under Section 66 for not more than 6 months.

Pahang is the only state in Malaysia that do not criminalise or punish homosexual intercourse under its shariah law.

==== Penang ====
Under the Syariah Criminal Offences (State of Penang) Enactment 1996 [En.3/1996], liwat and musahaqah are criminalised under Section 25 and 26 respectively, for which the punishment for both offences is maximum RM5,000 fine, maximum 3 years imprisonment, or maximum 6 strokes of whipping, or any combination thereof.

Liwat is simply defined as "sexual relations between male persons", while musahaqah is simply defined as "sexual relations between female persons".

Male posing as a female in public "for immoral purposes" is also criminalised under Section 28 of the Enactment, with punishment of up to RM1,000 fine, or up to 1 year imprisonment, or both. However, female posing as male is not criminalised under the Enactment.

==== Perak ====
Under the Crimes (Syariah) Enactment 1992 [Pk. En.3/1992] in Perak, any female person who wilfully commits musahaqah can be punished under Section 53 of the Enactment with up to RM2,000 fine, or up to 1 year imprisonment, or both. Musahaqah is simply defined as "sexual relations between a woman and a woman".

A man posing as a woman in public for "immoral purposes" may also be punished under Section 55 of the Enactment with up to RM1,000 fine, or up to 6 months imprisonment, or both.

Liwat (sodomy) and the act of a female cross-dressing as male are not criminalised under the shariah law of Perak.

==== Perlis ====
Under the Criminal Offences in the Syarak Enactment 1991 [En.4/1993] in Perlis, whoever wilfully commits liwat or musahaqah can be punished under Section 13 or 14 of the Enactment, with punishment of up to RM5,000 fine, or up to 3 years imprisonment, or both.

Liwat is specifically defined as "sexual intercourse between males or between a male and a female through the anus", while musahaqah is defined as "sexual intercourse between a woman and a woman".

A male posing as a female, or a female posing as a male, in a public place are both considered as "Pondan" (general term for queer or transgender in Malay) under Section 7 of the Enactment and can be punished with up to RM5,000 fine, or up to 3 years imprisonment, or both.

==== Selangor ====
Under the Syariah Criminal Offences (Selangor) Enactment 1995 [En.9/1995], Section 27 of the Enactment criminalised "sexual relations between persons of the same gender", which is simply defined as "a sexual act with another person of the same gender", with punishment of up to RM2,000 fine, or up to 1 year imprisonment, or both.

Alternatively, the now-invalid Section 28 also criminalised "sexual intercourse against the order of nature" by anyone with another man, woman, or animal, with punishment of up to RM5,000 fine, or up to 3 years imprisonment, or up to 6 strokes of whipping, or any combination thereof. The Selangor Enactment did not provide a definition as to what constitutes "sexual intercourse against the order of nature".

In February 2021, the Federal Court in Iki Putra Mubarrak v. Kerajaan Negeri Selangor & Anor ruled that Section 28 of the Selangor Enactment is unconstitutional, invalid, null and void, as it is similar in nature to Section 377A of the Penal Code and the Selangor State Legislative Assembly had encroached on and contravened the Parliament's legislative power over criminal law when it was enacting Section 28 of the Selangor Enactment.

Section 30 of the Enactment also criminalised the act of a male person posing as a female in public "for immoral purposes", with penalty of up to RM1,000 fine, or up to 6 months imprisonment, or both. However, male posing as a female is not criminalised under the Enactment.

A female convicted under Section 27 or 28 may also, in replacement of or in addition to her sentence, be ordered by the Islamic court to be committed to an approved home for up to 6 months under Section 54.

==== Sabah ====
Under the Syariah Criminal Offences Enactment 1995 [En.3/1995] in Sabah, whoever wilfully commits musahaqah under Section 77 of the Enactment, may be punished with up to RM1,000 fine, or up to 6 months imprisonment, or both. Whoever wilfully commits liwat may also be punished under Section 82 with up to RM5,000 fine, or 3 years imprisonment, or both.

Under the Enactment, liwat is simply defined as "sexual intercourse between a man and a man" while musahaqah is simply defined as "sexual intercourse between a woman and a woman".

Section 76 of the Enactment also criminalised "sexual intercourse against the order of nature" by any person with another man, woman, or animal, with punishment of up to RM5,000 fine, or up to 3 years imprisonment, or up to 6 strokes of whipping, or any combination thereof. The Enactment did not define what is "sexual intercourse against the order of nature".

Male posing as a female, or female posing as a male, in any public place is criminalised under Section 92 with up to RM1,000 fine, or up to 6 months, or both. Section 92 of the Enactment do not contain the "for immoral purposes" criterion found in majority of other states' shariah law, which mean cross-dressing for whatever reason in Sabah is illegal as long as it is done in a public place.

==== Sarawak ====
Under the Syariah Criminal Offences Ordinance 2001 [Swk. Cap. 46/2001] in Sarawak, liwat and musahaqah are criminalised under Section 22 and 23 of the Ordinance respectively, and both are punishable with up to RM5,000 fine, or up to 3 years imprisonment, or up to 6 strokes or whipping, or any combination thereof.

Under the Ordinance, liwat is simply defined as "sexual relations between men" while musahaqah is simply defined as "sexual relations between women".

Man posing as a woman in any public place "for immoral purposes" may also be punished under Section 25 of the Ordinance with up to RM1,000 fine, or up to 1 year imprisonment, or both. However, woman posing as man is not criminalised under the Ordinance.

A woman convicted of musahaqah may also, in replacement of or in addition to her sentence, be ordered by the Islamic court to be committed to an approved home for up to 6 months under Section 53.

==== Terengganu ====
Under the Syariah Criminal Offences (Takzir) (Terengganu) Enactment 2001 [Tr. En.7/2001], musahaqah is criminalised under Section 30 of the Enactment and can be punished with up to RM5,000 fine, up to 3 years imprisonment, or up to 6 strokes of whipping, or any combination thereof. Musahaqah is simply defined as "sexual relations between female persons".

In 2022, the Enactment was amended by the Terengganu State Legislative Assembly to create a new offence for "an act preparatory to Liwat", which is defined as "an act between a male and another male which leads to homosexual". The punishment for the new offence under Section 29A is up to RM5,000 fine, or up to 3 years imprisonment, or up to 6 strokes of whipping, or any combination thereof.

The 2022 amendment also raised the punishment for watie, from maximum RM3,000 fine to RM5,000 fine; from maximum 2 years imprisonment to 3 years; and a maximum of 6 strokes of whipping was also added as a new possible punishment. The 2022 amendment also for the first time defines watie as "any sexual act that does not involved penetration into the qubul or dubur which does not include adultery or liwat or musahaqah", thereby broadly criminalises any form of consensual sex (such as non-penetrative sex) between any unwed person of any gender that does not fall within the definition for adultery, liwat, or musahaqah.

Male posing as female is also criminalised under Section 33 of the Enactment. Previously, a person will only be considered to have offended this section if he do so in a public place and "for immoral purposes". However, the 2022 amendment removed these two criteria and therefore making cross-dressing in any places, no matter in public or private, or for any purposes, illegal under Section 33. This is in contrary to the shariah law provisions that banned cross-dressing found in other states, which often limit its application to only when the act of cross-dressing is done in public and "for immoral purposes".

The 2022 amendment also increased the penalty for Section 33 from RM1,000 fine to between RM1,000 and RM3,000 fine, and from up to 1 years imprisonment to up to 2 years imprisonment. Reoffender will also now be punished with up to RM5,000 fine, and either up to 3 years imprisonment, or up to 6 strokes of whipping, or both.

Female posing as male is also criminalised under Section 33A with the introduction of the 2022 amendment, with punishment of up to RM1,000 fine, or up to 1 year imprisonment, or both. Reoffender will also be punished with up to RM5,000 fine, and either up to 3 years imprisonment, or up to 6 strokes of whipping, or both.

Anyone who was convicted of any offences mentioned above may also be ordered by the Islamic court, either in replacement or in addition to their sentence, to undergo "rehabilitation" for a period of up to 1 year. Before the 2022 amendment, this provision only applied to female and the "rehabilitation" period is only up to 6 months.

== Adoption and family planning ==
Based on the Adoption Act 1952 (Adoption Act) and the Registration of Adoption Act 1952 (ROAA), there is no restrictions for a single person to adopt regardless of sexual orientation or gender identity.

== Gender identity and expression ==
Human Rights Watch reports that state-level Sharia (Islamic) laws prohibit cross-dressing, and transgender people "face arbitrary arrest, physical and sexual assault, imprisonment, discriminatory denial of health care and employment, and other abuses."

Transgender individuals have often been arrested by police officers under the civil laws governing "public indecency", and if they are Muslim, can be further charged by religious officers under Sharia Laws for "impersonating" women. A 2014 Human Rights Watch report alleged that transgender people are subjected to "assault, extortion, and violations of their privacy rights" by police, and humiliation, physical and sexual assault by Religious Department officials.

In 1998, 45 Muslim transvestites were charged and convicted in court for dressing as women, and 23 more transgender persons faced similar fines and imprisonment in 1999.

It has been estimated that a large number of transgender persons are forced to work on the streets as commercial sex workers to earn a living.

In November 2014, three transgender women from the state of Negeri Sembilan arrested for cross-dressing via Sharia law successfully appealed for review of the judicial law at the Court of Appeal for appropriate clothing of people with gender dysphoria. Due to the lack of a mention of gender dysphoria and the lack of medical evidence for a state legal adviser's claim that transgender people were insane, the court unanimously declared the anti-cross-dressing Sharia law as void and violating the constitutional right of "freedom of expression, movement and the right to live in dignity and equality". On 8 October 2015, the Federal Court of Malaysia overturned the ruling on procedural grounds. The Court found that the three women should have obtained judicial permission of a Federal Court judge when they commenced their constitutional challenge. Although a High Court judge had granted permission in November 2011, the Federal Court ruled that it had done so erroneously.

In August 2016, the Kuala Lumpur High Court ordered the National Registration Department (NRD) to update a trans man's information on his identity card to better reflect his gender identity and chosen name. The judge argued that "the plaintiff has a precious constitutional right to life under Article 5(1) of the Federal Constitution, and the concept of life under Article 5 must necessarily encompass the plaintiff’s right to live with dignity as a male and be legally accorded judicial recognition as a male." In 2017, this judgement was overturned on appeal.

== Hate speech ==
The Malaysian Communications and Multimedia Content Code 2022 section 6.1 (ii) defines "Hate speech," which is forbidden by Section 211 of the Communications and Multimedia Act.

Hate speech refers to any portrayal (words, speech, or pictures, etc.), which denigrates, defames, or otherwise devalues a person or group on the basis of race, ethnicity, religion, nationality, gender, sexual orientation, or disability and is prohibited. In particular: descriptions of any of these groups or their members involving the use of strong language, crude language, explicit sexual references, or obscene gestures, are considered hate speech.

== Blood donation ==
Homosexuals and bisexuals are prohibited from donating blood by the National Blood Centre of Malaysia. This policy seems to be gender neutral, since it doesn't explicitly mention the gender that is prohibited from donating blood.

== Public opinion ==
A 2013 Pew Research Center opinion survey showed that only 9% of the Malaysian population believe homosexuality should be accepted by society, while 86% believe it should not. Malaysia was one of the countries in Asia polled with the least acceptance of homosexuality.

A poll by Pew Research Center released in September 2023 found that support for same-sex marriage in Malaysia has risen to 17%. 59% of Buddhists, 35% of Christians and 49% of Hindus support same-sex marriage.

== LGBTQ rights in Malaysian politics ==
There is no legal protection for LGBTQ individuals. Marina Mahathir, the daughter of former prime minister Mahathir Mohamad, called for an end to discrimination based on sexual orientations in 1998 and 1999. "People's Anti-Homosexual Voluntary Movement", created in 1998 to lobby for stricter criminal laws against homosexuality. It is a member of the former ruling party United Malays National Organisation (UMNO).

In 2011, Seksualiti Merdeka (Independent Sexuality), an annual sexuality rights event, was centered around the theme of “Queer without Fear”. Publicity for the event featured videos of several Malaysian citizens proclaiming their queer identity, calling for the equality of LGBTQ rights. After publicizing the event, the Royal Malaysia Police released a statement banning the event, based on the premises of risking disturbance of public order and impeding on religious freedom. In 2014, Section 27 A(1)(C) of the Police Act, which was used to ban the event, was superseded by the Peaceful Assembly Act 2012 (PAA). This resulted in the ban on the event being lifted.

In April 2015, Nisha Ayub, a transgender woman and activist, aided three Muslim trans women in challenging the Sharia legislation outlawing males cross-dressing as females in the state of Negeri Sembilan through the JFS organisation. While the case was won in the Court of Appeal, the Federal Court later reversed the decision in October 2015.

In March 2019, Minister of Tourism, Arts and Culture Mohammadin Ketapi denied the existence of LGBTQ people in Malaysia, telling German reporters in the 2019 ITB Berlin tourism trade fair: "I don't think we have anything like that in our country." However, he later posted a statement on Twitter saying that his statement referred to the non-existence of specific LGBTQ-focused tourist campaigns in the country. When a Women's Day march was held in Kuala Lumpur on the same month, it was condemned by government officials and the political parties of United Malays National Organisation (UMNO) and Malaysian Islamic Party (PAS) as the march involved LGBTQ rights among its demands.

In April 2019, Malaysian authorities were accused for intimidating gay rights activist Numan Afifi by questioning him in the police station about a speech he made in the United Nations Human Rights Council (UNHRC) in Geneva in March 2019. The speech pointed out that Malaysia rejected the recommendations of a coalition of twelve Malaysian LGBTQ organizations on gender identity and sexual orientation.

In May 2019, George Clooney warned Malaysia and Indonesia against legislating a law allowing them to impose death penalty for homosexuality, as Brunei has legislated. The response of the Deputy Foreign Minister, Marzuki Yahya pointed out that Malaysia does not kill gay people, and will not resort to killing sexual minorities. He also said that though such lifestyles deviate from Islam, the government would not impose such a punishment on the group.

In May 2020, a man filed a challenge in the Federal Court against Islamic laws banning "intercourse against the order of nature" in the state of Selangor. On 25 February 2021, the Federal Court unanimously declared that the Selangor state law provision which made unnatural sex a Sharia offence was invalid as it contradicted the Federal Constitution and that such offences fall under Parliament's jurisdiction. The summary of the judgement was read out by Chief Justice, Tengku Maimun Tuan Mat.

=== The position of Mahathir Mohamad ===
In 2001, in his previous term as Prime Minister Mahathir Mohamad stated that the country will deport any visiting foreign cabinet ministers or diplomats who are gay. Mahathir also warned gay ministers in foreign countries not to bring along their partners while visiting the nation. Mahathir's daughter, Marina Mahathir, however has called for an end to discrimination based on sexual orientation.

During a lecture to students in a university in Bangkok, Thailand, in October 2018, Prime Minister Mahathir Mohamad stated that Malaysia would not "copy" Western nations' approach towards LGBTQ rights, indicating that these countries were exhibiting a disregard for the institutions of the traditional family and marriage, as the value system in Malaysia is good. In June 2019, he reiterated his stance, speaking at the Cambridge Union, he said that Malaysia cannot accept same-sex marriage or LGBTQ rights, saying “I don’t understand gay marriage. In Malaysia there are some things we cannot accept, even though it is seen as human rights in Western countries,” adding that same-sex marriage is a “regressive way of thinking” and that marriage was about having children and he claimed that the institution of marriage has almost been discarded.

=== Prosecution of Anwar Ibrahim ===
In 1998, Anwar Ibrahim was charged with corruption and sodomy. In 2000, he was sentenced to nine years for engaging in sodomy with his 19-year-old male chauffeur and his former male speech writer. Despite national and international protests, he was not released until he had served out four years of his sentence, until 2004, when the Federal Court of Malaysia acquitted him of all charges.

After his release, Anwar stated that he was innocent and the allegations were part of a government conspiracy to end his political career. He also felt that the national criminal laws against homosexuality ought to be reformed to protect consenting adults' rights to have a private life, although he also stated that same-sex marriage "is going a bit too far".

In 2007, former Prime Minister Mahathir Mohamad responded to a civil lawsuit filed by Anwar by stating that a homosexual should not hold public office in Malaysia and that he knew Anwar was a homosexual because Anwar's male chauffeur and a male speech writer both stated in court that they had had sexual relations with Anwar.

In July 2008, Anwar was arrested again, accused of sodomy with a male former aide. The arrest came shortly after Anwar claimed to be in a position to challenge the governing coalition after the opposition's successes in the March elections. However, he was released on bail and won the campaign for his former seat in Parliament.

In the beginning of 2015, Anwar was again arrested and sentenced to five years in prison.

On 16 May 2018, Malaysia's former king, Sultan Muhammad V, officially pardoned Anwar after meeting with members of the pardons board and Prime Minister Mahathir Mohamad. The full royal pardon was made on the basis of a "miscarriage of justice".

=== The position of Najib Razak ===
Ex-Malaysian Prime Minister Najib Razak made clear in a speech in August 2015 at an international Islamic moderation seminar in Selangor, that he believed Malaysia should not support LGBTQ rights. Najib stated that his administration will do its best to uphold human rights but only within the confines of Islam and that Malaysia cannot defend the more "extreme aspect of human rights", such as gay, lesbian and transsexual rights. This prompted Human Rights Watch to suggest that Malaysia withdraw from the United Nations if the government was not serious about upholding human rights for all.

=== LGBTQ-supporting organisations in Malaysia ===
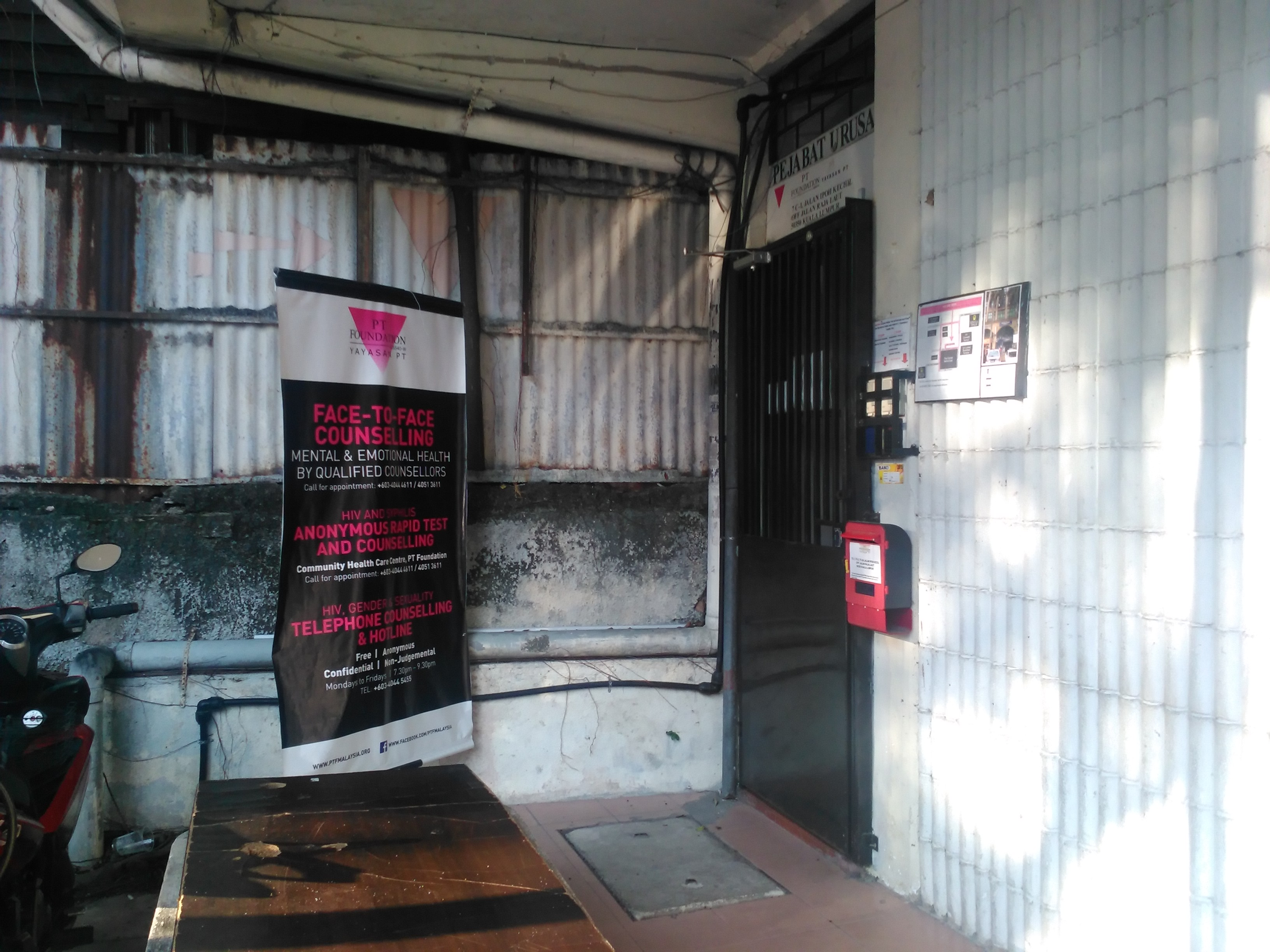
The PT Foundation, an LGBTQ centre in Malaysia

Malaysia does not have a national organisation committed to LGBTQ rights. Instead, a loose coalition of non-governmental organisations, artists, and individuals organise the annual sexuality rights festival Seksualiti Merdeka. Seksualiti Merdeka, meaning "Independent Sexuality", is an annual festival consisting of talks, performances, screenings, workshops, and forums to promote sexuality rights as a human right, to empower marginalised individuals and communities, and to create platforms for advocacy. Besides organising the programmes of this annual festival, members of this coalition are also involved in letter-writing campaigns, organising regular film screenings and discussions, academic advocacy and training of trainers. However, the Government has attempted to prevent these events from happening since 2011.

The groups involved in Seksualiti Merdeka have also on their own advocated for the rights of LGBTQ within the framework of human rights advocacy. These include established human rights organisations such as the Human Rights Committee of the Malaysian Bar, SUARAM, PT Foundation, KRYSS, Women's Candidacy Initiative, Persatuan Kesedaran Komuniti Selangor (EMPOWER), Purple Lab, Matahari Books, and The Annexe Gallery.

Several other groups such as Sisters in Islam, Women's Aid Organisation, and Amnesty International also have dealt with sexual orientation issues within their public health advocacy. The focus on AIDS-HIV education has allowed for more public discussion of sexual orientation, gender identity and human rights. PT Foundation, originally called Pink Triangle, focuses on "providing HIV/AIDS education, prevention, care and support programs, sexuality awareness and empowerment programs for vulnerable communities in Malaysia". The communities include MSM (men who have sex with men), transgender, sex workers, drug users, and people living with HIV. They are joined by other organisations, such as LPG (for gay men) and OutDo (for lesbians), which organise regular activities for their target communities.

=== HIV/AIDS issues ===
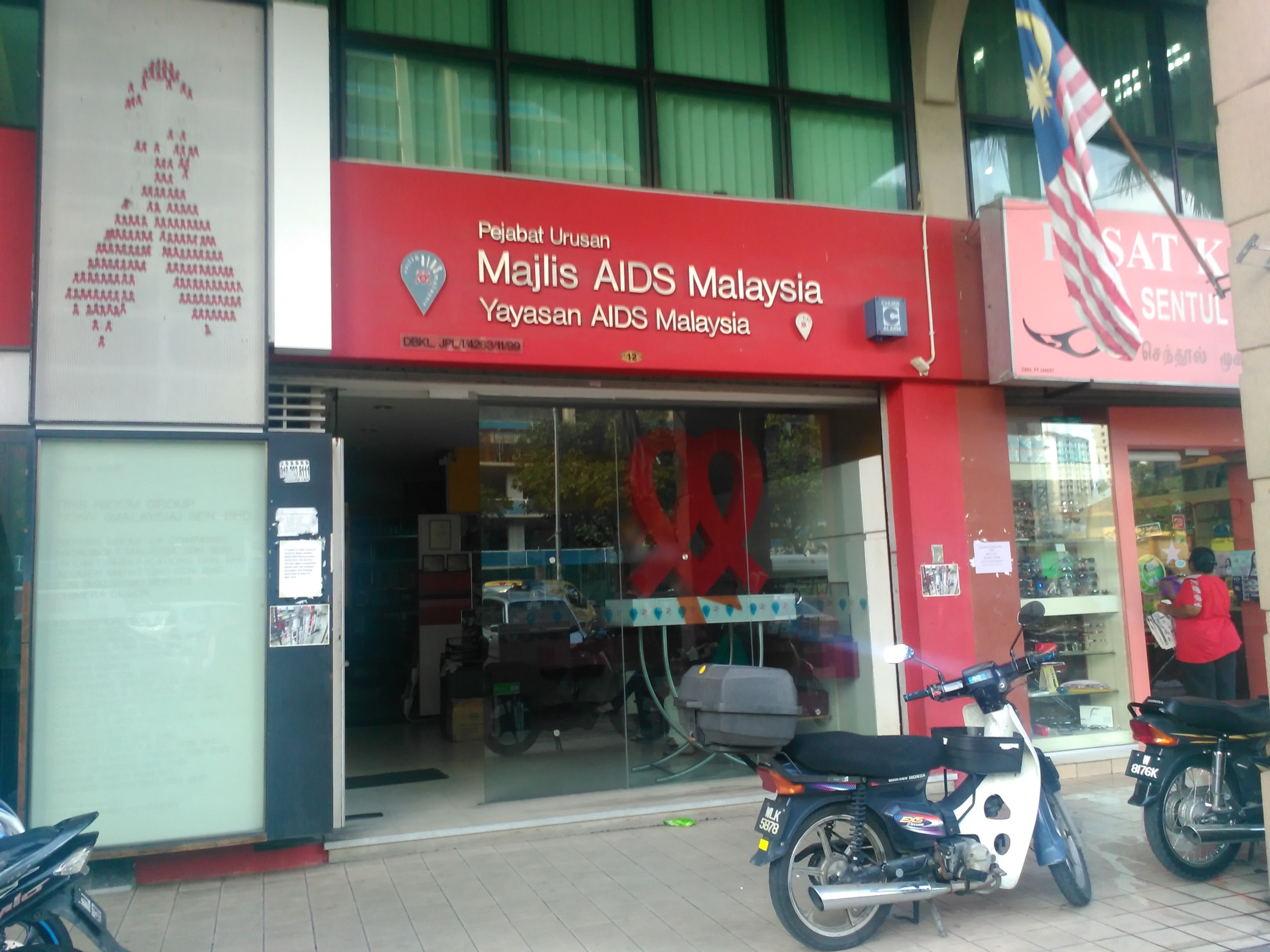
The Malaysian AIDS Council

While not solely a problem for LGBTQ people, the public health response to AIDS-HIV has required greater public discussion of topics such as human sexuality, gender roles, and sexual orientation.

Since the first official case of AIDS appeared in the nation in 1985, the government has been under more pressure to promote education and prevention campaigns as some experts have suggested that the number of Malaysians infected with HIV could go as high as 300,000 by the year 2015.

In 2006, the Government launched a new comprehensive public campaign that includes therapy and needle exchange programs for drug addicts and free medications provided at government clinics. However, in 2007, Malaysia's Ministry of Health was banned from advocating the use of condoms to prevent the spread of the disease due to a concern that such a campaign would be equated with a governmental endorsement of sexual conduct outside of a legal marriage.

== Summary table ==
Same-sex sexual activity legal	Federal criminal law	No Anal sex (male-male or male-female): Up to 20 years imprisonment with caning, fines and deportation.
Same-sex sexual activity legal	Federal criminal law	Lesbian sex: Uncertain (Note: See sub-heading 'Federal criminal law' above for more details and explanation.)
Same-sex sexual activity legal	State shariah law	No Gay sex or lesbian sex, or both, are illegal for Muslims in all states and federal territories, except Pahang. (Note: See sub-heading 'State Shariah law' above for more details and explanation.)
Equal age of consent	No	
Freedom of expression	No	
Anti-discrimination laws in employment	No	
Anti-discrimination laws in the provision of goods and services	No	
Anti-discrimination laws in all other areas (incl. indirect discrimination, hate speech)	No	
Same-sex marriage(s)	No	
Recognition of same-sex couples	No	
Stepchild adoption by same-sex couples	No	
Adoption by single people regardless of sexual orientation	Yes	
Joint adoption by same-sex couples	No	
LGBTQ people allowed to serve in the military	No	
Right to change legal gender	No	
Access to IVF for lesbians	No	
Commercial surrogacy for gay male couples	No Illegal for all couples regardless of sexual orientation.	
MSMs allowed to donate blood	No	
Conversion therapy banned	No The government promotes it.	

== See also ==
- Human rights in Malaysia
- LGBTQ rights in Asia
- Seksualiti Merdeka
- Asmara Songsang
- Bukak Api
- Miss Andy
- PT Foundation
