= Asmara Songsang =

Asmara Songsang (Abnormal Desire or Deviant Love) is a 2013 Malaysian play written by Adam Rahman. The play, which is anti-LGBT, received support from the Malaysian government and had Malaysian actors and actresses in its cast.

Rahman argued that homosexuality would spread across Malaysia if it was not countered. He was 73 at the time he wrote the play.

The play was released prior to national elections, and opposition leader Anwar Ibrahim had been accused of sodomy.

== Plot ==
The play's main characters are three friends who are LGBT. They have casual sex, take recreational drugs and hold parties. Their neighbours dislike their behaviour and attempt to get them to follow Islamic practices; the friends who refuse to change their behavior get struck by lightning and die. At the end the cast members sing an anthem for the unity of Malaysia.

== Cast ==
The cast of the 2013 production included Abby Rossidi, Jalaluddin Hassan, Kamal Adli, Razak Ahmad, Radhi Khalid, Najwa P. Ramlee, and Julia Ziegler.

== Release ==
Asmara Songsang opened in March 2013 at the Istana Budaya, the national theatre in Kuala Lumpur. The play was released on a tour of Malaysian universities, teachers' colleges, and schools.

== Reception ==
Human rights groups and some persons who watched the play criticized it, saying that it was divisive. S. Thilaga of Seksualiti Merdeka wrote that "We are extremely concerned that such damaging messages and misrepresentation will increase violence toward the community, [as] the LGBT community is already subject to multiple forms of violence and persecution by the state."

Rahman claimed that the play had an overall positive reception, and said: "If anyone said I tried to create hateful feelings, then I say no, I didn’t do that at all. I always do good things."

== See also ==
- LGBT rights in Malaysia
- Seksualiti Merdeka
