= Raid on the White Loft Hotel =

On 13 January 2026, authorities from the Melaka Islamic religious affairs department and the municipal council raided the White Loft Hotel in Malacca, Malaysia. The hotel had allegedly advertised that it was "gay-friendly", and was subsequently closed. On 15 January, the owner had apologized to the Hang Tuah Jaya Municipal Council (MPHTJ) and removed the promotional material. The hotel's license was subsequently suspended pending compliance with the Hotels (MPHTJ) By-Laws 2011.

== Background ==
The White Loft Hotel is a 37-room hotel in Melaka, Malaysia. The hotel's website had listed being "gay-friendly" under a list of services provided, leading to social media criticism.

== Raid ==
The raid was conducted under the Syariah Criminal Offences Enactment (State of Melaka) 1991, including offenses under Section 56 (sodomy), Section 57 (attempted sodomy) and Section 58 (unnatural sexual relations). The premises were empty when officers arrived, and Religious affairs executive councillor Rahmad Mariman noted no violations of the law were found upon inspection.

== Reaction ==
The Small and Medium Enterprises Association of Malaysia (Samenta) condemned the raid and closure ahead of Visit Malaysia Year (VMY) 2026.

== See also ==
- LGBTQ rights in Malaysia
- Law of Malaysia
