= Kamal Adli =

Malaysian actor, model and host (born 1986)

- Born: Ahmad Kamal bin Ahmad Adli; 16 April 1986 (age 40); Pekan, Pahang, Malaysia
- Occupations: Actor; Model; Television Host
- Years active: 2008–present
- Spouse: Uqasha Senrose (m. 2021)
- Children: 1

Ahmad Kamal Ahmad Adli, better known as Kamal Adli (born 16 April 1986), is a Malaysian actor, model, and television host. He was named Hero Remaja for 2007/2008 and is best known for comedic roles, though he has also taken on dramatic parts.

Kamal has appeared in television dramas including Bio-Nik, Zati & Si Mawas, Ana lu'lu, Putera Rayyan, Black Belt Kaler Pink and Black, as well as telefilms such as Kekasihku Is Setan, Nyamuk Tak Berdosa, Rongples Rongtaim and Perempuan Tanpa Dosa.

His film roles include Niyang Rapik (2010), Kembar Siang (2011), Gerimis Mengundang (2012), Gangster Celop (2013), Abang Long Fadil (2014), and Takluk: Lahad Datu (2024).

== Early life ==
Kamal was born on 16 April 1986 in Pekan, Pahang, the third of seven siblings. He was named Hero Remaja 2007/2008, an award given by the teen magazine Remaja to the year's most promising entertainer or influencer aged 17 to 23. Kamal holds a Diploma in Broadcasting from the Malaysian Institute of Integrative Media (MIIM; TV3 Academy).

== Personal life ==
Kamal was in a relationship with actress Intan Ladyana that ended after six years.

Kamal proposed to fellow actor Uqasha Senrose live on air during the MeleTOP Era Awards on 20 December 2020, shortly after presenting several awards at the ceremony; the pair had previously starred together in the drama Setelah Terlafaznya Akad. They married in a private ceremony on 5 November 2021.

== Career ==
Kamal's first acting role came in 2008, a minor part in the second season of the drama series Renjis on Astro Ria. He began his career as a host with the show Pandanganku, Ceritaku, also broadcast on Astro Ria. In 2009, Kamal took the lead role of Nik in the superhero science fiction TV3 drama Bio-Nik, produced by KRU Studios. The drama follows a teenager named Nik who is critically injured in a road accident and subsequently revived with sophisticated, versatile robotic enhancements to his body.

After Bio-Nik, Kamal starred opposite Liyana Jasmay in the drama Zati & Si Mawas. His first film role came in 2010, in Niyang Rapik, directed by Ahmad Idham and co-starring Shaheizy Sam and Awal Ashaari.

In 2011, Kamal appeared alongside Liyana and Zahiril Adzim as a villager's assistant in the horror film Senjakala, directed by Ahmad Idham. He was first paired with Intan Ladyana in the film Kembar Siang, directed by Hatta Azad Khan, in which Kamal played twin brothers, Awal and Awi. He also starred alongside Nora Danish in the drama Ana lu'lu, broadcast on TV3's Slot Lestary.

Working again under Idham's direction, Kamal co-starred with Indonesian actress Olivia Lubis Jensen in the Malaysia–Indonesia romantic film Gerimis Mengundang, broadcast on 31 May 2012. He then returned to television as the lead in the series Putera Rayyan, on TV3's Slot Samarinda, alongside Miera Leyana and Nad Zainal.

In 2013, Kamal starred with Syamsul Yusof and Hanis Zalikha in the action-comedy film Gangster Celop, directed by Ahmad Idham and produced by Datuk Yusof Haslam. He also appeared in the film 3 Temujanji, directed by Hashim Rejab and starring Pierre Andre and Yana Samsudin. He later competed in the reality show Liga Lawak Superstar, and appeared alongside Jalaluddin Hassan, Razak Ahmad, Julia Ziegler, Radhi Khalid and Najwa P. Ramlee in the stage production Asmara Songsang, directed by Rahman Adam and staged at Lambang Sari, Istana Budaya, on 1–2 March 2013.

In 2014, Kamal and Zizan Razak took the lead roles in the action-comedy film Abang Long Fadil, directed by Syafiq Yusof. A spin-off of KL Gangster, the film cast Kamal as Adam, son of a warrior. He also appeared in the horror film Cerita Hantu Malaysia, directed by Pierre Andre.

Kamal played Chi in the telefilm Rongples Rongtaim, directed by Yusry KRU and starring Tauke Jambu, Chelsia Ng, Bell Ngasri, Chew Kin Wah and Ayahanda Abdul Rani Kulup, broadcast on Astro Citra's Karya 12 slot. This marked the second time Kamal and Tauke Jambu had acted together, after Abang Long Fadil.

He starred with Aaron Aziz in the comedy drama Black Belt Kaler Pink, which aired on Astro Warna, and later appeared in the military drama film Malay Regiment, directed by Jurey Latiff Rosli, which aired on 31 August 2017.

Kamal also appeared as a guest in Mamu Mami Gosip, a sitcom broadcast on the FINAS Malaysia YouTube channel and led by Kazar Saisi, Tauke Jambu, Delimawati, Fasha Sandha, Elisya Sandha, Afifah Nasir, Aidil Aziz, Fikhree Bakar and Amyza Adnan. Other guests on the show included Zahirah Macwilson, Saharul Ridzwan, the late Abam Bocey, Joey, Fauziah Nawi, Hazama, Farahdhiya, Achey, Liza Abdullah and Azrel Ismail. The sitcom was recorded in 2017, before the emergence of the COVID-19 pandemic.

== Filmography ==
=== Films ===
Year	Title	Character	Notes
2010	Niyang Rapik	Helmi	First film
2010	Semerah Cinta Stilleto	Randy	Cameo appearance
2011	Senjakala	Abang Intan	
2011	Kembar Siang	Awal / Awi	
2011	Senario The Movie Ops Pocot	Hairi	
2012	Gerimis Mengundang	Zamani	
2012	Salam Cinta	Amirul	
2012	Ada Aku, Kau Ada ???	Aziz Sattar	
2012	3 Temujanji	Kamal	
2012	PE3	Fumi / Sergeant Akbar	
2012	Apa Celop Toqq	Doctor	Cameo appearance
2013	Gangster Celop	Aman	
2013	Cinderella	Ray	
2013	Paku	Pian	
2014	Abang Long Fadil	Adam	
2014	MTB: Misi Tawan Baby	Helmi	
2014	Cerita Hantu Malaysia	Saad	
2015	Isteri Untuk Dijual	Redza	
2015	Apartment	Nasa	
2016	Kecoh! Primadona Kena Hantu	Nek Nak	
2017	Malay Regiment	Kamal	
2017	Kolestrol VS Cinta	Irfan	
2018	Block 404	Husband	Special appearance
2020	Superbike The Movie	Bugis	
2022	Gracias Barcelona	Himself	
2022	Zaara	Remy	
2023	Escape	Adam / Captain Khalif	
2024	Takluk: Lahad Datu	DSP Jailani	
TBA	Munajat Kekasih	Lothfi	Post-production
TBA	Wantugo		Post-production
TBA	Satu		Pre-production

=== Drama ===
Year	Title	Character	TV Channel	Notes
2008	Impian Sunsilk	Johan Dhani	TV3	First drama
2008–2009	Renjis 2	Budi	Astro Ria	
2009	Zati & Si Mawas	Iskandar	TV3	
2009	Bio-Nik	Nik	TV3	
2010	Mayang Mengurai	Shahrul	TV3	
2010	Shah Jihan	Jihan	TV3	
2010	Seribu Kali Cinta	Nizam	TV3	
2010	Pusaka	Sham	TV2	
2010	Blogger Boy	Adriani's Boyfriend	8TV	Episode 35
2010	Tipah Vavavoom	Imran	TV3	
2010–2011	Mistik Alam Hitam	TJ	Astro Ria & Astro Prima	Episode: "Dendam Roh
2010–2011	Mistik Alam Hitam	Rahim	Astro Ria & Astro Prima	Episode: "Beranak Dalam Kubur"
2011	Terowong	Amin	TV3	Episode: "Penunggu"
2011	Gemilang	Umar	TV3	
2011	Ana lu'lu	Harris Azhan	TV3	
2012	Apa Celop!	Aman	TV3	
2012	Runtun Qalbu	Qalbu	TV3	
2012–2013	Putera Rayyan	Putera Rayyan	TV3	
2013	Tanggang Ayu	Haziq	Astro Prima	
2013	Bila Hati Perempuan Menjerit	Amar	Astro Prima	
2013	Terukir Di Bintang	Zain	TV3	
2014	Syurga Tanpa Cinta	Luqman	TV1	
2014	Jiwa	Jiwa	TV3	
2014	Masihkah Ada Cinta	Sam	TV3	
2014	Alam Maya	Amman	TV9	
2014–2015	Antidot	Alam	TV3	
2015	Jodoh Sebelah Pintu	Dr Badrul Syah	Unifi TV	
2016	Sha & Shah	Fariz Ameerul Shah	Astro Ria	
2016	#AssalamualaikumCinta	Azrif Iqbal	Astro Ria	
2016	Pergilah Air Mata	Badrul	TV1	
2016	Oh My English! After School	Kamal	Astro TVIQ	Episode 1
2016	PU Wid	Ahmad Widad	Astro Oasis	
2017	Black Belt Kaler Pink	Burn	Astro Warna	
2017	Pergilah Air Mata	Badrul	TV1	4 Special Episodes
2017	Duda Pujaan Dara	Tengku Razeen	Astro Ria	
2018	Banteras	Badrul	Astro Ria	
2018–2019	Jika Masih Ada Rindu	Hisyam	TV3	
2019	Setelah Terlafaznya Akad	Hanan	Astro Ria	
2019	Utusan Cinta Buat Adam	Adam Firdaus	TV3	
2020		Izz Rizqin	TV3	
2020	Perempuan Tanpa Sinasa	Rizal	Astro Ria	
2021	Mamu Mami Gosip		FINAS Malaysia	
2021	Lockdown	ACP Hamdan	Astro Ria	
2021	Scammer	Joe	Astro Ria	
2021	Sihir	Nuh	Astro Ria	
2022	Setelah Terlafaznya Akad 2	Hanan	Astro Ria	
2023	Akira Khan	Raden	Astro Ria	
2023	B.A.R.I.S.T.A: Misi Terpaling Sulit	Agent G	Astro Ria	
2023–2024	Mystic Village	Mail	Astro Premier	
2024	Hikayat Bawang Putih Bawang Merah	Putera Badlishah	Astro Ceria	
2025	Dia Imamku	Amiruddin 'Budin'	Astro Ria	
2025	Hilang Kasyorga	Rodi	DEGUP	

=== Web drama ===
Year	Title	Character	Application	Notes
2019–2021	Black	Detective Khairul Malik / Black	Viu	First drama
2023	Operandi Gerhana	Yusof	Netflix & Mewatch	Drama produced by Mediacorp Suria
2024	Nafsu	Sam	Viu	

=== Telefilm ===
Year	Title	Character	TV Channel	Notes
2009	Otai Rempit	Anuar	TV3	First telefilm
2009	Kekasihku Is Setan	Iskandar	Astro Ria	
2010	Senandung Semalam	Hazry	TV1	
2010	Lagu Kita	Ameer	Astro Citra	
2011	Diari Suami 9 Bulan	Hairul	TV9	
2011	Hati Seorang Ibu	Mail	Astro Prima	
2011	Azam Ala Kazam	Azam	TV3	
2012	Alamak 7 Hari Lagi	Haris	TV3	
2012	Apa Celop Raya	Aman	TV3	
2012	Cuba Jadi Lelaki	Amir	TV9	
2012	Doktor Cinta	Opie	TV9	
2013	Nyamuk Tak Berdosa	Bahrin	TV3	
2013	Baran	Malik	TV3	
2013	Sayangku Damia	Halim	TV3	
2013	Cinta	Zaidi	TV2	
2013	Kompang Abang Zabidi	Zabidi	Astro Warna	
2013	PA Cinta	Adam Razuwan	TV9	
2014	Munajat Terhentis	Yusman	TV2	
2014	Dendam Roh Alia	Malik	Astro Prima	
2014	Nasi Dagang Nasi Ayam	Yang Ariff	TVi	
2014	Portret Duka	Dr Azreen	TV3	
2015	Bulan Tiada Madu	Emran	TV9	
2015	Tipah Semperit		TV1	
2015	Kasih Antarta Kita	Hisham	TV1	
2015	Suamiku Encik Beruang		Astro Ria	
2015	Madam Nona Pokok Sena	Ipin	Astro Prima	
2015	Andai Bein Khilaf Thatu	Muiz	TV2	
2015	Hai Lah Menantu	Imran	TV3	
2015	Cik Puan Bibik	Shafiq	TV1	
2016	Pondok Senja	Zulfa	TV3	
2016	Budak Dari Tak Bai	Johari	Astro Ria	
2016	Pontianak Sesat Dalam Kampung	Yamin	Astro Ria	
2016	Rongples Rongtaim	Chi	Astro Citra	
2016	Sha, Shah and Syawal	Shah	Astro Ria	
2016	#Assalamualaikum Cinta Raya	Azrif Iqbal	Astro Ria	
2016	Ms Oxford Mr Mesir	Farhan	Astro Ria	
2017	Huru Hara Raya	Fareez	TV3	
2017	Jongkong	Wan Ishak	Astro Citra	
2018	Suatukala	Pendek	Astro First Exclusive	
2018	Waktu Khalil	Wan	TV3	
2018	Sha vs Shah	Shah	Astro Ria	
2018	I Heart You Cik Yah	Zulkifli	Astro Citra	
2018	My Sweet Madu	Farel	ntv7	
2018	Hingga Juppa Lagi	Nuh	Astro Citra	
2018	Haloba	Mikael	ntv7	
2019	Boyfriend Aku Dari...	Andy	Astro Citra	
2019	Hantu Don	Abu	TV3	
2019	Dato' S	Sazali	Astro First Exclusive	
2019	Ada Mata Memerhati	Shah	Astro Citra	
2020	Telunjuk Iblis	Abadi	Astro Citra	
2021	Pengantin Dari Neraka	Aidit Noh	Astro Ria	
2025	Rahsia Kelabu	Rahimi	TV3	

=== Theater ===
Year	Title	Character
2009	Teater Musikal Impak Maksima	
2011	Teater Musikal Gerimis Mengundang	
2013	Asmara Songsang	

=== Television ===
Year	Title	Role	TV Channel	Notes
2008	Rentak Juara, Rhythm Of Champions	Host	TV1	
2008	Pandanganku Ceritaku	Host	Astro Ria	
2013	Liga Lawak Superstar	Participants	Astro Warna	
2014	Super Spontan 2014	Guest Artist	Astro Warna	
2015	Dewi Remaja	Lawyer	Astro Ria	
2016	Trek Selebriti	Guest Artist	Astro Ria	
2016	Super Spontan Superstar (Season 1)	Participants	Astro Warna	Eliminated during the semi-final week alongside Altimet
2017	Curi Curi Cuti	Host	Astro Ria	
2017	Super Spontan Superstar (Season 2)	Contestants	Astro Warna	Won the competition, defeating runner-up Fad Bocey
2017	From Spain to Morocco	Host	TV2	
2018	Gegar Lawak	Host	Astro Warna	With Fad Bocey
2018	CCTV	Guest artist	Astro Ria	Promoting Gegar Lawak with mentor Nizam Jentik-Jentik
2018	Pecah Perut	Regular comedian	Astro Warna	Actors and comedians of each sketch
2018	Lawak Ke Dik?	Host	Astro Warna	
2018	CCTV	Guest artist	Astro Ria	Promoting the show Lawak Ke Dik?
2018	MeleTOP	Guest host	Astro Ria	Replacing Nabil Ahmad (13 March 2018)
2018	Bocey and Friends	Guest artist	Astro Warna	Episode 2; played a nurse alongside Mark Adam and Rozita Che Wan
2018	MeleTOP	Guest artist	Astro Ria	Promoting the telefilm Suatukala
2018	#ExpeRIance Projek Theme Park (Season 2)	Guest host	Astro Ria	With winner and fan Fadila Sajai in Istanbul, Turkey – Episode 11 (16 May 2018)
2018	Oh My Family Raya	Guest artist	Astro Ria	With Fikry Ibrahim; Kamal was assigned to look after Syatilla Melvin and Shaheizy Sam's children, while Fikri looked after Asyraf Khalid and Tya Arifin's children
2018	Pangngung Karot Pok Ya	Regular comedian	Astro Warna	With Ebby Yus, Mamak Puteh and Shahrol Shiro; hosted by Sabri Yunus
2018	Bocey and Friends Rayalah Pulak	Guest artist	Astro Warna	With Sharifah Shahirah, Salih Yaacob, Ajak Shiro, Elizad Sharifuddin and Datin Nina Juren
2018	SuperSpontan Extravaganza	Guest Jury	Astro Warna	Episode 1
2018	Super Spontan Extravaganza	Guest host	Astro Warna	Replacing Dato' AC Mizal, who was hosting the Baik Punya Cilok 4D concert (Week 2)
2018	Bawang Live	Guest	Astro Ria	Promoting the telemovie I Heart You Cik Yah (20 September 2018)
2018	Jozan Live	Guest	Astro Warna	With Nora Danish, promoting the telemovie Hingga Jumpa Lagi (Episode 17, 13 November 2018)
2018	Pecah Perut	Regular comedian	Astro Warna	Comedy sketch show directed by Sharmaine Othman
2019	Bawang Live	Guest	Astro Ria	With Uqasha Senrose, Zeera Azizi, Natasha Elyzza and Alif Muhaimin, promoting the telefilm Boyfriend Aku dari dot dot (14 March 2019)
2019	Michael Ang's Halal Kitchen	Guest Artist	Astro Ria	Episode 6 (10 June 2019)
2019	Bawang Live	Guest	Astro Ria	With Uqasha Senrose, Zeera Azizi, Alif Muhaimin, Sharifah Shahora, Zul Helmy, Nadya Syahera and Edwin Dawson, promoting the drama Setelah Terlafaznya Akad (17 June 2019)
2019	Gempak TV	Guest Artist	Astro Ria	With Uqasha Senrose and Nadya Syahera, promoting the drama Setelah Terlafaznya Akad (19 June 2019)
2019	MeleTOP	Guest Artist	Astro Ria	With Erwin Dawson, Nadya Syahera and Zeera Azizi, promoting the drama Setelah Terlafaznya Akad (25 June 2019)
2019	CCTV	Guest Artist	Astro Ria	With Nadya Syahera, Zulhelmy and Zeera Azizi, promoting Setelah Terlafaznya Akad (4 July 2019)
2019	Bawang Live	Guest Artist	Astro Ria	With Zul Helmy, Sharifah Shahora, Zeera Azizi, Nadya Syahera and Alif Muhaimin, promoting the final week of Setelah Terlafaznya Akad (29 July 2019)
2019	Experience : Rialisasi Job Selebriti	Guest Artist	Astro Ria	Realizing his dream job as a 'Dream Cruise Crew' member (1 October 2019)
2019	MeleTOP	Guest Artist	Astro Ria	With Zulin Aziz, Fikry Ibrahim and Puteri Aishah, promoting the Astro First Exclusive telefilm Dato' S (5 November 2019)
2020	Suara Viral	Host	Astro Ria	Hosted with Vicha for the introductory episode
2020	I Can See Your Voice Malaysia (season 3)	Guest investigator	TV3	With Reen Rahim, investigating guest artist Stacy in episode 2 (23 February 2020)
2020	I Can See Your Voice Malaysia (season 3)	Guest investigator	TV3	With Eira Syazira and Yusuf Bahrin, investigating guest artist Erra Fazira in episode 6 (22 March 2020)
2020	Gegar Vaganza (season 7)	Guest	Astro Ria	Appeared after Linda Nanuwil's performance in the week 8 finals concert, promoting the final episode of the drama Perempuan Tanpa Dosa (29 November 2020)
2020	Meletop Era Awards	Guest artist	Astro Ria	Presented the Meletop Era Group/Duo, Meletop Era Singer and Meletop Era Song awards alongside Uqasha Senrose
2021	MeleTOP	Guest	Astro Ria	With PU Azman, promoting the Gema Lawak Superstar program. Other guests included Uqasha Senrose, Elly Mazlein, Cik B, Eira Syazira, Azad Jazmin, Isyariana, Amar Baharin, Marsha Milan, novelist Siti Rosmizah, Along Kamaruddin, Redza Rosli, Hefny Sahad, Hael Husaini, Shaza Bae, Akhmal Nazri, the band Madam, Dato' Rizalman, Danial Zaini, Ustaz Fakhrul, Chubb-e, Lah Ahmad, Mawi, Remy Ishak and Amira Othman (30 March 2021)
2021	Gema Lawak Superstar	Host	Astro Warna	Comedy musical show hosted with PU Azman for four special weeks during Ramadan
2021	Maharaja Lawak Mega 2021	Guest	Astro Warna	With Hun Hakeem, promoting the drama Sihir, produced by Astro Ria
2021	Lagu Cinta Kita (Season 3)	Host	TV3	With Ain Edruce
2022	Melodi	Guest presenter	TV3	
2022	Romantika Raya	Himself	Astro Ria	With his wife, Uqasha Senrose
2022	The House Kamal & Uqasha	Himself	Astro Ria	With his wife, Uqasha Senrose
2023	Mega Spontan	Mentor	Astro Warna	
2024	Oh Baby Kamal & Uqasha	Himself	Astro Ria	With his wife, Uqasha Senrose, and their child, Hawra Uqaira
2026–present	Melodi	Host	TV3	With Ain Edruce

== Awards and nominations ==
Year	Award	Category	Nomination	Results
2007/2008	Hero Remaja	Teen Hero Search Champion	—N/a	Won
2010	Malaysian Film Festival 23rd	Best Male Promising Actor	Niyang Rapik	Nominated
2013	Liga Lawak Superstar	Kumpulan Apa Kasih Toq (Ranker)	—N/a	Won
2016	Berita Harian Popular Star Award 29th	Popular Male TV Actor	—N/a	Nominated
2017	MeleTOP Era Award 4th	Popular Comedy Artist	—N/a	Nominated
2017	Super Spontan Superstar 2017	First Place (Winner)	—N/a	Won
2017	2nd Telenovela Award	Best Actor	Pergilah Air Mata	Nominated
2017	2nd Telenovela Award	Best Actor	Sha & Shah	Nominated
2017	2nd Telenovela Award	Popular Male Actor	Pergilah Air Mata	Nominated
2017	2nd Telenovela Award	Prolific Male Actor	—N/a	Won
2018	MeleTOP Era Awards 5th	Popular Comedy Artist	Super Spontan Superstar 2017	Nominated
2018	3rd Telenovela Award	Popular Telenovela Male Actor	Duda Pujaan Dara	Nominated
2018	Berita Harian Popular Star Award 31st	Best Couple in Drama	Kamal Adli & Zahirah MacWilson(Duda Pujaan Dara)	Nominated
2018	Berita Harian Popular Star Award 31st	Popular Sensational Artist	—N/a	Nominated
2020	Asian Television Award	Best Leading Actor (Digital)	Black (Viu Original )	Nominated
2020	Berita Harian Popular Star Award 33rd	Best Couple in Drama (Online)	Kamal Adli & Uqasha Senrose (After the Marriage)	Won
2020	Berita Harian Popular Star Award 33rd	Popular Male TV Actor	—N/a	Nominated
2020	Berita Harian Popular Star Award 33rd	Popular Controversial Artist (Online)	—N/a	Nominated
2020	Drama Melody Award Sangat	Drama Couple Sangat	Kamal Adli & Hannah Delisha (Not Forced Marriage)	Nominated
2020	Most Wanted 2020	Single Artist Tergempak	—N/a	Nominated
2024	36th Daily Popular Star Award	Popular Male Film Artist	—N/a	Nominated
