= Bukak Api =

Bukak Api is a 2000 documentary about Malaysian mak nyahs, or trans women, directed by Osman Ali. It was intended to educate people about the mak nyahs.

== Background ==
Ali was not a known film director in Malaysia at the time of the film's creation .

Malaysian sex workers use the words "bukak api" to refer to a sexual act; the words literally mean "to open fire".

== Content ==
The film includes several elements that are not allowed according to Malaysian censorship laws, including "fuck", other forms of profanity, scenes that have people almost naked, and sex scenes. Andrew Hock Soon Ng, the author of "The Politics of Reclaiming Identity: Representing the Mak Nyahs in Bukak Api", wrote that including these elements reflects the realities of male-to-female transgender people in Malaysia.

Hock wrote that the film countered the common depiction of transsexualism in Malaysian television and other media as being "comical".

== Cast ==
- Mislina Mustaffa as Murni

== Release and reception ==
Kuala Lumpur authorities banned the film from screening in regular cinemas. Hock wrote that "allegedly" the rationale was due to the film's depiction of Kuala Lumpur's nightlife, but he believed that the authorities also disliked how the film "dignifies" and "sympathetically portrays" workers in the sex industry and mak nyahs. However, the film was screened in film festivals, including the KL Freedom Film Festival and ones in Egypt, France, New Zealand, and Singapore. G.C. Khoo, author of "Urban Geography as Pretext: Sociological Landscapes of Kuala Lumpur in Independent Malaysian Films", wrote that the film screenings caused Bukak Api to get broader audiences beyond its original intentions.

Many film reviews from Malaysia and other countries characterised Bukak Api as a "brave" film.

== See also ==
- LGBT rights in Malaysia
