= Mak nyah =

Malaysian trans women

Mak Nyah ([ˈmaʔ ˈɲa]), alternatively spelled maknyah, is a Malay vernacular term for trans women in Malaysia. It arose in the late 1980s in order to distinguish trans women from other minorities.

The name is preferred by Malaysian trans women as opposed to various derogatory terms (namely, pondan and bapok), which were previously used by Sarawakians when referring to transsexuals and cross-dressers. These are also considered slurs, which are variously directed to gay men as well as transgender individuals. Though less used, the term pak nyah is sometimes used for trans men, and the hybrid term mak-pak nyah for all transgender individuals.

== Origins and definition of the term ==
Mak nyah is formed from the word mak, meaning 'mother', and nyah, meaning 'transition' (literally, 'to run from'). Khartini Slamah describes how the term arose in the transgender community: "[F]irst, [as] a desire to differentiate ourselves from gay men, transvestites, cross-dressers, drag queens, and other 'sexual minorities' with whom all those who are not heterosexual are automatically lumped, and second, because we also wanted to define ourselves from a vantage point of dignity rather than from the position of derogation in which Malaysian society had located us Slamah then goes on to explain that the term mak nyah does not necessarily refer to a trans woman who has undergone sex reassignment surgery (SRS): "[M]ak Nyahs define themselves in various ways along the continuums of gender and sexuality: as men who look like women and are soft and feminine, as the third gender, as men who dress up as women, as men who like to do women's work, as men who like me, etc."

The term of mak nyah for Malay transgender women can be contrasted with other terms for the trans community around the world, such as hijras in India, kathoeys in Thailand and occult in Myanmar.

== Language ==
Bahasa Seteng (literally "half-language") is a secret language used within the Malaysian transgender community, in order to reflect their identity. It is commonly used amongst teenage mak nyah.

== Legal status ==
The mak nyah community in Malaysia experiences heavy discrimination, including discrimination in employment, housing and health care. In 2010, the governments of the United Kingdom and Australia recognised Malaysian transgender asylum seekers, in response to the persecution and discrimination that they face in Malaysia.

Malaysian courts have issued ambiguous messages as to whether a transgender individual's preferred gender identity or their birth sex should appear on their ID cards (My Kad). For example, in Wong's case, the judge of the High Court of Ipoh upheld the refusal of the national Registration Department to amend or correct the Birth Certificate and National Registration Identity Card of the claimant who was a transsexual man. However, in J.G.'s case, A judge of the High Court of Kuala Lumpur, in dealing with a case which shared many similarities with Wong's case, decides that the claimant's ID card be amended to acknowledge her gender identity.

Under Section 21 of the Minor Offences Act 1955, mak nyah can be charged for indecent behaviour for dressing as women, and Section 28 of the Syariah Criminal Offences (Federal Territories) Act 1997 prohibits any male person from wearing a woman's attire in a public place and posing as a woman for "immoral purposes". Such a charge usually results in a small fine of RM25–50.

=== Under Islam ===
In 1983, the Malaysian Conference of Rulers issued a fatwa which ruled that sex reassignment surgery should be forbidden to all except intersex people, on the basis that any other surgery was against Islam, as Islam only permits khunsa (intersex people) to undergo a sex change operation. Sunni Islam forbids males from cross-dressing, wearing make-up, injecting hormones to enlarge their breasts, and undergoing sex change operations. Research shows that 78% of mak nyahs would prefer to have a sex change operation if their religion permits them to do so.

As the majority of mak nyah are Malay Muslims, they can be further charged by a sharia court, for which there is a fine of RM800–3000. Laws such as these have been used by the Malaysian religious authorities (the Jabatan Hal Ehwal Agama Islam Negeri Sembilan) to oppress the mak nyah community, through raids, interrogation, violence and detention.

In addition, having SRS also causes a problem in terms of Islamic burial rites, which state that only a woman may be permitted to bath the body of a woman. This does not include mak nyah individuals, even if they have undergone SRS. However, maknyah individuals who underwent SRS could not be bathed by a man either.

== Statistics ==
It has been estimated that there are about 10,000 mak nyah in Malaysia. In the city of Kuching there are 700 mak nyah (75% Malays, the rest are Dayaks and Chinese).

== Research ==
Teh Yik Koon wrote research documents on the mak nyah, including a 1998 study and a 2002 book called The Mak Nyahs. Andrew Hock Soon Ng, the author of "The Politics of Reclaiming Identity: Representing the Mak Nyahs in Bukak Api", wrote that the book was "the most extensive scholarly work" on the mak nyahs.

== In media ==
The 2000 documentary Bukak Api is about Mak nyah.

== See also ==
- Hijra
- Kathoey
- List of transgender-related topics
