= Penal Code (Malaysia) =

Penal code of Malaysia

Federal Council of the Federated Malay States
- Long title: An Act relating to criminal offences.
- Citation: Act 574
- Territorial extent: Malaysia
- Enacted: 1936 (F. M. S. Cap. 45); Revised: 1997 (Act 574 w.e.f. 7 August 1997)
- Effective: Throughout Malaysia—31 March 1976, Act A327, P.U. (B) 139/1976

Amended by
- Revised Edition of the Laws (Operation) Enactment 1936 [F.M.S. En. 1/1936] Penal Code (Amendment) Enactment 1936 [F.M.S. En. 41/1936] Penal Code (Amendment) Enactment 1937 [F.M.S. En. 11/1937] Statute Law Revision (Chief Secretary's Powers) Enactment 1937 [F.M.S. En. 18/1937] Statute Law Revision (General Amendments) Enactment 1938 [F.M.S. En. 3/1938] Penal Code (Amendment) Enactment 1938 [F.M.S. En. 30/1938] Notification under the Statute Law Revision (General Amendments) Enactment 1938 [F.M.S. G.N. 940/1939] Notification under the Statute Law Revision (General Amendments) Enactment 1938 [F.M.S. G.N. 1702/1939] Sedition Enactment 1939 [F.M.S. En. 13/1939] Transfer of Powers Ordinance 1948 [F.M. Ord. 1/1948] Penal Code (Amendment and Extended Application) Ordinance 1948 [F.M. Ord. 32/1948] Criminal Justice Ordinance 1953 [F.M. Ord. 14/1953] Penal Code (Amendment) Ordinance 1957 [F.M. Ord. 25/1957] Federal Constitution (Modification of Laws) Order 1957 [L.N. (N.S.) 1/1957] Corrigendum to Federal Constitution (Modification of Laws) Order 1957 [L.N. (N.S.) 9/1957] Corrigendum to Federal Constitution (Modification of Laws) Order 1957 [L.N. (N.S.) 56/1957] Banishment Ordinance 1959 [Ord. 11/1959] Kidnapping Act 1961 [Act 41/1961] Courts of Judicature Act 1964 [Act 7/1964] Penal Code (Amendment) Act 1965 [Act 24/1965] Penal Code (Amendment) Act 1966 [Act 1/1966] Penal Code (Amendment) Act 1967 [Act 39/1967] Penal Code (Amendment and Extension) Act 1976 [Act A327] Constitution (Amendment) Act 1976 [Act A354] Penal Code (Amendment) Act 1982 [Act A538] Penal Code and Criminal Procedure Code (Amendment) Act 1983 [Act A549] Penal Code (Amendment) Act 1985 [Act A614] Penal Code (Amendment) Act 1986 [Act A651] Penal Code (Amendment) Act 1989 [Act A727] Penal Code (Amendment) Act 1993 [Act A860] Penal Code (Amendment) Act 2001 [Act A1131] Penal Code (Amendment) Act 2003 [Act A1210] Penal Code (Amendment) Act 2006 [Act A1273] Penal Code (Amendment) Act 2007 [Act A1303] Penal Code (Amendment) Act 2012 [Act A1430] Penal Code (Amendment) Act 2014 [Act A1471] Penal Code (Amendment) Act 2015 [Act A1483] Penal Code (Amendment) Act 2017 [Act A1536] Penal Code (Corrigendum) [P.U. (B) 589/2022] Penal Code (Amendment) Act 2023 [Act A1681] Abolition of Mandatory Death Penalty Act 2023 [Act 846] Penal Code (Amendment) (No. 2) Act 2023 [Act A1691] Penal Code (Amendment) Act 2024 [Act A1721] Penal Code (Amendment) Act 2025 [Act A1750]

Keywords
- Criminal code, criminal offence
- Status: In force

The Penal Code (Malay: Kanun Keseksaan lit. 'Canon of Punishment') is the primary law that codifies most of the criminal offences and procedures in Malaysia. Majority of criminal offences such as murder, theft, robbery, rape, forgery, rioting, terrorism and treason fall under the purview of this Code. The current form of Malaysian Penal Code was originated from the Federated Malay States Penal Code adopted in 1936, which was transplanted from the Straits Settlements Penal Code and carries many similarities with the Indian Penal Code.

== History ==
The current form of the Penal Code of Malaysia can trace its roots from the Straits Settlements Penal Code 1871, (Note: Enacted as Ordinance No. IV of 1871, later revised as Ordinance No. 14 in the Straits Settlements in 1920 or 1921.) which in turn was modelled upon the Indian Penal Code. Between 1905 and 1909, each of the four component states of the Federated Malay States (F.M.S.) through enactments in their own State Council, (Note: In Perak: Enactment No. 8 of 1909 (passed 28 May 1909, in force from 11 June 1909); In Selangor: Enactment No. 18 of 1905 (passed 4 December 1905, in force from 1 January 1906); In Negeri Sembilan: Enactment No. 18 of 1905 (passed 6 December 1905, in force from 1 January 1906); In Pahang: Enactment No. 12 of 1909 (passed 6 May 1909, in force from 1 June 1909)) directly adopted the Straits Settlements Penal Code of 1871 as their respective state-level Penal Code. Nevertheless, state like Perak had already adopted the Straits Settlements Penal Code at a much earlier date through an Order-in-Council on 28 June 1884.

The various state-level adoption enactments in the four states also stipulated that all future amendments made to the Straits Settlements Penal Code by the Straits Settlements' legislature will be automatically adopted and applied to each of the state-level Penal Code in the federation.

In 1936, the Revised Edition of the Laws of the Federated Malay States, prepared under the Revised Edition of the Laws Enactment 1932, came into force on 20 February that year. The legal series incorporated the Straits Settlements Penal Code to become an enactment of Federated Malay States and to act as the sole Penal Code for the entire federation. Upon its incorporation, it superseded the four state-level Penal Codes in Perak, Selangor, Negeri Sembilan and Pahang, and was designated as Chapter 45.

In 1948, after the Federation of Malaya was formed through the amalgation of the Straits Settlements (excluding Singapore), the Federated Malay States and the Unfederated Malay States, the Penal Code (Amendment and Extended Application) Ordinance 1948 was passed by the Federal Legislative Council of Malaya, which extended the F.M.S. Penal Code to the entire Federation of Malaya, while simultaneously repealed the Straits Settlements Penal Code that was still in force in Penang and Malacca, and other individual Penal Codes that were in force in the Unfederated Malay States.

13 years after the formation of Malaysia in 1963, the F.M.S Penal Code was again extended to apply throughout Malaysia on 31 March 1976 through the Penal Code (Amendment and Extension) Act 1976, which also repealed the Penal Codes of Sabah and Sarawak, thereby making the F.M.S. Penal Code as the single criminal code that universally apply throughout the country.

In 1997, the Penal Code undergone a revision by the Law Revision Committee and was subsequently designated as Act 574. The only changes made to its content was to its long title, converting from "An Enactment to consolidate the law relating to criminal offences" to "An Act relating to criminal offences".

== Structure ==
Penal Code of Malaysia, in its current form (4 June 2015), sub-divided into twenty three chapters, comprises five hundred and eleven sections (including 37 amendments). The code starts with an introduction, provides explanations and exceptions used in the code, and covers a wide range of offences.

=== Chapter I: Preliminary ===
1. Short title
2. Punishment of offences committed within Malaysia
3. Punishment of offences committed beyond, but which by law may be tried within Malaysia
4. Extension of Code to extraterritorial offences
5. Certain laws not to be affected by this Code

=== Chapter II: General Explanations ===
6. Definitions in the Code to be understood subject to exceptions
7. Expression once explained is used in the same sense throughout the Code
8. “Gender”
9. “Number”
10. “Man” and “woman”
11. “Person”
12. “Public”
13. (Deleted)
(There are no ss. 14–16)
17. “Government”
(There is no s. 18)
19. “Judge”
20. “Court”
21. “Public servant”
22. “Movable property”
23. “Wrongful gain” and “wrongful loss”
24. “Dishonestly”
25. “Fraudulently”
26. “Reason to believe”
27. “Property in possession of wife, clerk or servant”
28. “Counterfeit”
29. “Document”
30. “Valuable security”
31. “A will”
32. Words referring to acts include illegal omissions
33. “Act” and “omission”
34. Each of several persons liable for an act done by all, in like manner as if done by him alone
35. When such an act is criminal by reason of its being done with a criminal knowledge or intention
36. Effect caused partly by act and partly by omission
37. Cooperation by doing one of several acts constituting an offence
38. Several persons engaged in the commission of a criminal act, may be guilty of different offences
39. “Voluntarily”
40. “Offence”
(There are no ss. 41–42)
43. “Illegal”, “unlawful” and “legally bound to do”
44. “Injury”
45. “Life”
46. “Death”
47. “Animal”
48. “Vessel”
49. “Year” and “month”
50. “Section”
51. “Oath”
52. “Good faith”
52A. “Non-serious offence”
52B. “Serious offence”

=== Chapter III: Punishments ===
53–55. (Deleted)
(There is no s. 56)
57. Fractions of terms of punishment
(There is no s. 58)
59–60. (Deleted)
(There are no ss. 61–62)
63–64. (Deleted)
(There is no s. 65)
66–70. (Deleted)
71. Limit of punishment of offence which is made up of several offences
72. Punishment of a person found guilty of one of several offences, the judgment stating that it is doubtful of which
73–74. (Deleted)
75. Punishment of persons convicted, after a previous conviction of an offence punishable with three years’ imprisonment
75A. Punishment of mandatory imprisonment for persons convicted of multiple serious offences

=== Chapter IV: General Exceptions ===
76. Act done by a person bound, or by mistake of fact believing himself bound, by law
77. Act of Judge when acting judicially
78. Act done pursuant to the judgment or order of a Court
79. Act done by a person justified, or by mistake of fact believing himself justified by law
80. Accident in the doing of a lawful act
81. Act likely to cause harm but done without a criminal intent, and to prevent other harm
82. Act of a child under 10 years of age
83. Act of a child above 10 and under 12 years of age, who has not attained sufficient maturity of understanding
84. Act of a person of unsound mind
85. Intoxication when a defence
86. Effect of defence of intoxication when established
87. Act not intended and not known to be likely to cause death or grievous hurt, done by consent
88. Act not intended to cause death, done by consent in good faith for the benefit of a person
89. Act done in good faith for the benefit of a child or person of unsound mind, by or by consent of guardian
90. Consent known to be given under fear or misconception and consent of a child or person of unsound mind
91. Acts which are offences independently of harm caused to the person consenting, are not within the exceptions in sections 87, 88 and 89
92. Act done in good faith for the benefit of a person without consent
93. Communication made in good faith
94. Act to which a person is compelled by threats
95. Act causing slight harm

Right of Private Defence
96. Nothing done in private defence is an offence
97. Right of private defence of the body and of property
98. Right of private defence against the act of a person of unsound mind
99. Acts against which there is no right of private defence
100. When the right of private defence of the body extends to causing death
101. When such right extends to causing any harm other than death
102. Commencement and continuance of the right of private defence of the body
103. When the right of private defence of property extends to causing death
104. When such right extends to causing any harm other than death
105. Commencement and continuance of the right of private defence of property
106. Right of private defence against a deadly assault when there is risk of harm to an innocent person

=== Chapter V: Abetment ===
107. Abetment of a thing
108. Abettor
108A. Abetment in Malaysia of offences outside Malaysia
109. Punishment of abetment if the act abetted is committed in consequence, and where no express provision is made for its punishment
110. Punishment of abetment if the person abetted does the act with a different intention from that of the abettor
111. Liability of abettor when one act is abetted and a different act is done
112. Abettor, when liable to cumulative punishment for act abetted and for act done
113. Liability of abettor for an offence caused by the act abetted different from that intended by the abettor
114. Abettor present when offence committed
115. Abetment of an offence punishable with death or imprisonment for life
116. Abetment of an offence punishable with imprisonment
117. Abetting the commission of an offence by the public, or by more than ten persons
118. Concealing a design to commit an offence punishable with death or imprisonment for life
119. A public servant concealing a design to commit an offence which it is his duty to prevent
120. Concealing a design to commit an offence punishable with imprisonment

=== Chapter VA: Criminal Conspiracy ===
120A. Definition of criminal conspiracy
120B. Punishment of criminal conspiracy

=== Chapter VI: Offences against the State ===
121. Waging or attempting to wage war or abetting the waging of war against the Yang di-Pertuan Agong, a Ruler or Yang di-Pertua Negeri
121A. Offences against the person of the Yang di-Pertuan Agong, Ruler or Yang di-Pertua Negeri
121B. Offences against the authority of the Yang di-Pertuan Agong, Ruler or Yang di-Pertua Negeri
121C. Abetting offences under section 121A or 121B
121D. Intentional omission to give information of offences against section 121, 121A, 121B or 121C by a person bound to inform
122. Collecting arms, etc., with the intention of waging war against the Yang di-Pertuan Agong, a Ruler or Yang di-Pertua Negeri
123. Concealing with intent to facilitate a design to wage war
124. Assaulting Member of Parliament, etc., with intent to compel or restrain the exercise of any lawful power
124A. (Deleted)
124B. Activity detrimental to parliamentary democracy
124C. Attempt to commit activity detrimental to parliamentary democracy
124D. Printing, sale, etc., of documents and publication detrimental to parliamentary democracy
124E. Possession of documents and publication detrimental to parliamentary democracy
124F. Importation of document and publication detrimental to parliamentary democracy
124G. Posting of placards, etc.
124H. Dissemination of information
124I. Dissemination of false reports
124J. Receipt of document and publication detrimental to parliamentary democracy
124K. Sabotage
124L. Attempt to commit sabotage
124M. Espionage
124N. Attempt to commit espionage
125. Waging war against any power in alliance with the Yang di-Pertuan Agong
125A. Harbouring or attempting to harbour any person in Malaysia or person residing in a foreign State at war or in hostility against the Yang di-Pertuan Agong
126. Committing depredation on the territories of any power at peace with the Yang di-Pertuan Agong
127. Receiving property taken by war or depredation mentioned in sections 125 and 126
128. Public servant voluntarily allowing prisoner of State or war in his custody to escape
129. Public servant negligently suffering prisoner of State or war in his custody to escape
130. Aiding escape of, rescuing, or harbouring such prisoner
130A. Interpretation of this Chapter

=== Chapter VIA: Offences Relating to Terrorism ===
130B. Interpretation in relation to this Chapter

Suppression of Terrorist Act and Support for Terrorist Act
130C. Committing terrorist acts
130D. Providing devices to terrorist groups
130E. Recruiting persons to be members of terrorist groups or to participate in terrorist acts
130F. Providing training and instruction to terrorist groups and persons committing terrorist acts
130FA. Receiving training and instruction from terrorist groups and persons committing terrorist acts
130FB. Attendance at place used for terrorist training
130G. Inciting, promoting or soliciting property for the commission of terrorist acts
130H. Providing facilities in support of terrorist acts
130I. Directing activities of terrorist groups
130J. Soliciting or giving support to terrorist groups or for the commission of terrorist acts
130JA. Travelling to, through or from Malaysia for the commission of terrorist acts in foreign country
130JB. Possession, etc. of items associated with terrorist groups or terrorist acts
130JC. Offence to build, etc. conveyance for use in terrorist acts
130JD. Preparation of terrorist acts
130K. Harbouring persons committing terrorist acts
130KA. Member of a terrorist group
130L. Criminal conspiracy
130M. Intentional omission to give information relating to terrorist acts

Suppression of Financing of Terrorist Acts
130N. Providing or collecting property for terrorist acts
130O. Providing services for terrorist purposes
130P. Arranging for retention or control of terrorist property
130Q. Dealing with terrorist property
130QA. Accepting gratification to facilitate or enable terrorist acts
130R. Intentional omission to give information about terrorist property
130S. Intentional omission to give information relating to terrorism financing offence
130T. Offences by body corporate
130TA. Non-application of Offenders Compulsory Attendance Act 1954 and sections 173A, 293 and 294 of the Criminal Procedure Code

=== Chapter VIB: Organised Crime ===
130U. Interpretation in relation to this Chapter
130V. Member of an organised criminal group
130W. Assisting an organised criminal group
130X. Harbouring member of an organised criminal group
130Y. Consorting with an organised criminal group
130Z. Recruiting persons to be members of an organised criminal group
130ZA. Participation in an organised criminal group
130ZB. Accepting gratification to facilitate or enable organised criminal activity
130ZC. Enhanced penalties for offences committed by an organised criminal group or member of an organised criminal group

=== Chapter VII: Offences Relating to the Armed Forces ===
131. Abetting mutiny, or attempting to seduce a soldier or sailor from his duty
132. Abetment of mutiny, if mutiny is committed in consequence thereof
133. Abetment of an assault by a soldier or sailor on his superior officer, when in the execution of his office
134. Abetment of such assault if the assault is committed
135. Abetment of the desertion of a soldier, sailor or airman
136. Harbouring a deserter
137. Deserter concealed on board merchant vessel through negligence of master
138. Abetment of act of insubordination by a soldier, sailor or airman
139. Persons subject to Articles of War not punishable under this Code
140. Wearing the dress of a soldier, sailor or airman
140A. “Harbour”
140B. Application of Chapter VII

=== Chapter VIII: Offences against the Public Tranquillity ===
141. Unlawful assembly
142. Being a member of an unlawful assembly
143. Punishment
144. Possessing weapons or missiles at unlawful assemblies
145. Joining or continuing in an unlawful assembly, knowing that it has been commanded to disperse
146. Force used by one member in prosecution of common object
147. Punishment for rioting
148. Possessing weapons or missiles at riot
149. Every member of an unlawful assembly to be deemed guilty of any offence committed in prosecution of common object
150. Hiring, or conniving at hiring, of persons to join an unlawful assembly
151. Knowingly joining or continuing in any assembly of five or more persons after it has been commanded to disperse
152. Assaulting or obstructing public servant when suppressing riot, etc.
153. Wantonly giving provocation, with intent to cause riot
153A. (Deleted)
154. Owner or occupier of land on which an unlawful assembly is held
155. Liability of person for whose benefit a riot is committed
156. Liability of agent of owner or occupier for whose benefit a riot is committed
157. Harbouring persons hired for an unlawful assembly
158. Being hired to take part in an unlawful assembly or riot, or to go armed
159. Affray
160. Punishment for committing affray

=== Chapter IX: Offences by, or Relating to, Public Servants ===
161. Public servant taking a gratification, other than legal remuneration, in respect of an official act
162. Taking a gratification in order, by corrupt or illegal means, to influence a public servant
163. Taking a gratification, for the exercise of personal influence with a public servant
164. Punishment for abetment by public servant of the offences above defined
165. Public servant obtaining any valuable thing, without consideration, from person concerned in any proceeding or business transacted by such public servant
166. Public servant disobeying a direction of the law, with intent to cause injury to any person
167. Public servant framing an incorrect document with intent to cause injury
168. Public servant unlawfully engaging in trade
169. Public servant unlawfully buying or bidding for property
170. Personating a public servant
171. Wearing garb or carrying token used by public servant with fraudulent intent

=== Chapter X: Contempts of the Lawful Authority of Public Servants ===
172. Absconding to avoid service of summons or other proceeding from a public servant
173. Preventing service of summons or other proceeding, or preventing publication thereof
174. Non-attendance in obedience to an order from a public servant
175. Omission to produce a document to a public servant by a person legally bound to produce such document
176. Omission to give notice or information to a public servant by a person legally bound to give notice or information
177. Furnishing false information
178. Refusing oath when duly required to take oath by a public servant
179. Refusing to answer a public servant authorized to question
180. Refusing to sign statement
181. False statement on oath to public servant or person authorized to administer an oath
182. False information, with intent to cause a public servant to use his lawful power to the injury of another person
183. Resistance to the taking of property by the lawful authority of a public servant
184. Obstructing sale of property offered for sale by authority of a public servant
185. Illegal purchase or bid for property offered for sale by authority of a public servant
186. Obstructing public servant in discharge of his public functions
187. Omission to assist public servant when bound by law to give assistance
188. Disobedience to an order duly promulgated by a public servant
189. Threat of injury to a public servant
190. Threat of injury to induce any person to refrain from applying for protection to a public servant

=== Chapter XI: False Evidence and Offences against Public Justice ===
191. Giving false evidence
192. Fabricating false evidence
193. Punishment for false evidence
194. Giving or fabricating false evidence with intent to procure conviction of a capital offence
195. Giving or fabricating false evidence with intent to procure conviction of an offence punishable with imprisonment
196. Using evidence known to be false
197. Issuing or signing a false certificate
198. Using as a true certificate one known to be false in a material point
199. False statement made in any declaration which is by law receivable as evidence
200. Using as true any such declaration known to be false
201. Causing disappearance of evidence of an offence committed, or giving false information touching it, to screen the offender
202. Intentional omission, by a person bound to inform, to give information of an offence
203. Giving false information respecting an offence committed
203A. Disclosure of information
204. Destruction of document to prevent its production as evidence
205. False personation for the purpose of any act or proceeding in a suit
206. Fraudulent removal or concealment of property to prevent its seizure as a forfeiture or in execution of a decree
207. Fraudulent claim to property to prevent its seizure as a forfeiture or in execution of a decree
208. Fraudulently suffering a decree for a sum not due
209. Dishonestly making a false claim before a Court
210. Fraudulently obtaining a decree for a sum not due
211. False charge of offence made with intent to injure
212. Harbouring an offender
213. Taking gifts, etc., to screen an offender from punishment
214. Offering gift or restoration of property in consideration of screening offender
215. Taking gift to help to recover stolen property, etc.
216. Harbouring an offender who has escaped from custody, or whose apprehension has been ordered
216A. Harbouring robbers or gang-robbers, etc.
216B. “Harbour”
217. Public servant disobeying a direction of law with intent to save person from punishment, or property from forfeiture
218. Public servant framing an incorrect record or writing with intent to save person from punishment, or property from forfeiture
219. Public servant in a judicial proceeding corruptly making an order, report, etc., which he knows to be contrary to law
220. Commitment for trial or confinement by a person having authority who knows that he is acting contrary to law
221. Intentional omission to apprehend on the part of a public servant bound by law to apprehend
222. Intentional omission to apprehend on the part of a public servant bound by law to apprehend person under sentence of a Court
223. Escape from confinement negligently suffered by a public servant and facilitating or enabling any terrorist act, etc.
224. Resistance or obstruction by a person to his lawful apprehension
225. Resistance or obstruction to the lawful apprehension of another person
225A. Public servant omitting to apprehend or suffering other persons to escape in cases not already provided for
225B. Offences against laws of Malaysia where no special punishment is provided
226. (Deleted)
227. Violation of condition of remission of punishment
228. Intentional insult or interruption to a public servant sitting in any stage of a judicial proceeding
229. Personation of a juror or assessor

=== Chapter XII: Offences Relating to Coin and Government Stamps ===
230. Interpretation
231. (Deleted)
232. Counterfeiting coin
233. (Deleted)
234. Making or selling instrument for counterfeiting coin
235. Possession of instrument or material for the purpose of using the same for counterfeiting coin
236. Abetting in Malaysia the counterfeiting out of Malaysia of coin
237. (Deleted)
238. Import or export of counterfeit coin
239. (Deleted)
240. Delivery of coin, possessed with the knowledge that it is counterfeit
241. Delivery to another of coin as genuine, which when first possessed the deliverer did not know to be counterfeit
242. (Deleted)
243. Possession of coin by a person who knew it to be counterfeit when he became possessed thereof
(There are no ss. 244–245)
246. (Deleted)
247. Fraudulently or dishonestly diminishing the weight or altering the composition of coin
248. (Deleted)
249. Altering appearance of coin with intent that it shall pass as a coin of a different description
250. (Deleted)
251. Delivery of coin, possessed with the knowledge that it is altered
252. (Deleted)
253. Possession of coin by a person who knew it to be altered when he became possessed thereof
254. Delivery to another of coin as genuine, which when first possessed, the deliverer did not know to be altered
255. Counterfeiting a Government stamp
256. Having possession of an instrument or material for the purpose of counterfeiting a Government stamp
257. Making or selling an instrument for the purpose of counterfeiting a Government stamp
258. Sale of counterfeit Government stamp
259. Having possession of a counterfeit Government stamp
260. Using as genuine a Government stamp known to be counterfeit
261. Effacing any writing from a substance bearing a Government stamp, or removing from a document a stamp used for it, with intent to cause loss to Government
262. Using a Government stamp known to have been before used
263. Erasure of mark denoting that stamp has been used

=== Chapter XIII: Offences Relating to Weights and Measures ===
264. Fraudulent use of false instrument for weighing
265. Fraudulent use of false weight or measure
266. Being in possession of false weights or measures
267. Making or selling false weights or measures

=== Chapter XIV: Offences Affecting the Public Health, Safety, Convenience, Decency and Morals ===
268. Public nuisance
269. Negligent act likely to spread infection of any disease dangerous to life
270. Malignant act likely to spread infection of any disease dangerous to life
271. Disobedience to a quarantine rule
272. Adulteration of food or drink which is intended for sale
273. Sale of noxious food or drink
274. Adulteration of drugs
275. Sale of adulterated drugs
276. Sale of any drug as a different drug or preparation
277. Fouling the water of a public spring or reservoir
278. Making atmosphere noxious to health
279. Rash driving or riding on a public way
280. Rash navigation of a vessel
281. Exhibition of a false light, mark or buoy
282. Conveying person by water for hire in a vessel overloaded or unsafe
283. Danger or obstruction in a public way or navigation
284. Negligent conduct with respect to any poisonous substance
285. Negligent conduct with respect to any fire or combustible matter
286. Negligent conduct with respect to any explosive substance
287. Negligent conduct with respect to any machinery in the possession or under the charge of the offender
288. Negligence with respect to pulling down or repairing buildings
289. Negligence with respect to any animal
290. Punishment for public nuisance
291. Continuance of nuisance after injunction to discontinue
292. Sale, etc., of obscene books, etc.
293. Sale, etc., of obscene objects to young person
294. Obscene songs

=== Chapter XV: Offences Relating to Religion ===
295. Injuring or defiling a place of worship with intent to insult the religion of any class
296. Disturbing a religious assembly
297. Trespassing on burial places, etc.
298. Uttering words, etc., with deliberate intent to wound the religious feelings of any person
298A. Causing, etc., disharmony, disunity, or feelings of enmity, hatred or ill will, or prejudicing, etc., the maintenance of harmony or unity, on grounds of religion

=== Chapter XVI: Offences Affecting the Human Body ===
Offences Affecting Life
299. Culpable homicide
300. Murder
301. Culpable homicide by causing the death of a person other than the person whose death was intended
302. Punishment for murder
(There is no s. 303)
304. Punishment for culpable homicide not amounting to murder
304A. Causing death by negligence
305. Abetment of suicide of child or insane person
306. Abetment of suicide
307. Attempt to murder
308. Attempt to commit culpable homicide
309. Attempt to commit suicide
309A. Infanticide
309B. Punishment for infanticide
(There are no ss. 310–311)

Causing Miscarriage; Injuries to Unborn Children; Exposure of Infants; and Concealment of Births
312. Causing miscarriage
313. Causing miscarriage without woman’s consent
314. Death caused by act done with intent to cause miscarriage. If act done without woman’s consent
315. Act done with intent to prevent a child being born alive or to cause it to die after birth
316. Causing death of a quick unborn child by an act amounting to culpable homicide
317. Exposure and abandonment of a child under twelve years by parent or person having care of it
318. Concealment of birth by secret disposal of dead body

Hurt
319. Hurt
320. Grievous hurt
321. Voluntarily causing hurt
322. Voluntarily causing grievous hurt
323. Punishment for voluntarily causing hurt
324. Voluntarily causing hurt by dangerous weapons or means
325. Punishment for voluntarily causing grievous hurt
326. Voluntarily causing grievous hurt by dangerous weapons or means
326A. Punishment for causing hurt by spouse
327. Voluntarily causing hurt to extort property or to constrain to an illegal act
328. Causing hurt by means of poison, etc., with intent to commit an offence
329. Voluntarily causing grievous hurt to extort property, or to constrain to an illegal act
330. Voluntarily causing hurt to extort confession or to compel restoration of property
331. Voluntarily causing grievous hurt to extort confession or to compel restoration of property
332. Voluntarily causing hurt to deter public servant from his duty
333. Voluntarily causing grievous hurt to deter public servant from his duty
334. Voluntarily causing hurt on provocation
335. Causing grievous hurt on provocation
336. Punishment for act which endangers life or the personal safety of others
337. Causing hurt by an act which endangers life or the personal safety of others
338. Causing grievous hurt by an act which endangers life or the personal safety of others

Wrongful Restraint and Wrongful Confinement
339. Wrongful restraint
340. Wrongful confinement
341. Punishment for wrongful restraint
342. Punishment for wrongful confinement
343. Wrongful confinement for three or more days
344. Wrongful confinement for ten or more days
345. Wrongful confinement of person for whose liberation a writ has been issued
346. Wrongful confinement in secret
347. Wrongful confinement for the purpose of extorting property or constraining to an illegal act
348. Wrongful confinement for the purpose of extorting confession or of compelling restoration of property

Criminal Force and Assault
349. Force
350. Criminal force
351. Assault
352. Punishment for using criminal force otherwise than on grave provocation
352A. Punishment for using criminal force by spouse
353. Using criminal force to deter a public servant from discharge of his duty
354. Assault or use of criminal force to a person with intent to outrage modesty
355. Assault or criminal force with intent to dishonour a person, otherwise than on grave provocation
356. Assault or criminal force in attempt to commit theft of property carried by a person
357. Assault or criminal force in attempt wrongfully to confine a person
358. Assaulting or using criminal force on grave provocation

Kidnapping, Abduction, Slavery and Forced Labour
359. Kidnapping
360. Kidnapping from Malaysia
361. Kidnapping from lawful guardianship
362. Abduction
363. Punishment for kidnapping
364. Kidnapping or abducting in order to murder
365. Kidnapping or abducting with intent secretly and wrongfully to confine a person
366. Kidnapping or abducting a woman to compel her marriage, etc.
367. Kidnapping or abducting in order to subject a person to grievous hurt, slavery, etc.
368. Wrongfully concealing or keeping in confinement a kidnapped person
369. Kidnapping or abducting child under ten years with intent to steal movable property from the person of such child
370. Buying or disposing of any person as a slave
371. Habitual dealing in slaves
372. Exploiting any person for purposes of prostitution
372A. Persons living on or trading in prostitution
372B. Soliciting for purpose of prostitution
373. Suppression of brothels
373A. (Deleted)
374. Unlawful compulsory labour

Hostage-Taking
374A. Hostage-taking

Rape
375. Rape
375A. Husband causing hurt in order to have sexual intercourse
375B. Gang rape
376. Punishment for rape

Incest
376A. Incest
376B. Punishment for incest

Unnatural Offences
377. Buggery with an animal
377A. Carnal intercourse against the order of nature
377B. Punishment for committing carnal intercourse against the order of nature
377C. Committing carnal intercourse against the order of nature without consent, etc.
377CA. Sexual connection by object
377D. Outrages on decency
377E. Inciting a child to an act of gross indecency

=== Chapter XVII: Offences Against Property ===
Theft
378. Theft
379. Punishment for theft
379A. Punishment for theft of a motor vehicle
380. Theft in dwelling house, etc.
381. Theft by clerk or servant of property in possession of master
382. Theft after preparation made for causing death or hurt in order to commit the theft
382A. Persons convicted of an offence against section 379, 380 or 382 committing subsequent offence against such sections

Extortion
383. Extortion
384. Punishment for extortion
385. Putting person in fear of injury in order to commit extortion
386. Extortion by putting a person in fear of death or grievous hurt
387. Putting person in fear of death or of grievous hurt in order to commit extortion
388. Extortion by threat of accusation of an offence punishable with death, or imprisonment, etc.
389. Putting person in fear of accusation of offence, in order to commit extortion

Robbery and Gang-Robbery
390. Robbery
391. Gang-robbery
392. Punishment for robbery
393. Attempt to commit robbery
394. Voluntarily causing hurt in committing robbery
395. Punishment for gang-robbery
396. Gang-robbery with murder
397. Robbery when armed or with attempt to cause death or grievous hurt
398. (Deleted)
399. Making preparation to commit gang-robbery
400. Punishment for belonging to gang of robbers
401. Punishment for belonging to wandering gang of thieves
402. Assembling for purpose of committing gang-robbery

Criminal Misappropriation of Property
402A. Definition of “agent”, “company”, “director”, “officer”
403. Dishonest misappropriation of property
404. Dishonest misappropriation of property possessed by a deceased person at the time of his death

Criminal Breach of Trust
405. Criminal breach of trust
406. Punishment of criminal breach of trust
407. Criminal breach of trust by carrier, etc.
408. Criminal breach of trust by clerk or servant
409. Criminal breach of trust by public servant or agent
409A. Defence not available
409B. Presumption

Receiving Stolen Property
410. Stolen property
411. Dishonestly receiving stolen property
411A. Receiving benefit derived from criminal activities of organized criminal group
412. Dishonestly receiving property stolen in the commission of a gang-robbery
413. Habitually dealing in stolen property
414. Assisting in concealment of stolen property

Cheating
415. Cheating
416. Cheating by personation
417. Punishment for cheating
418. Cheating with knowledge that wrongful loss may be thereby caused to a person whose interest the offender is bound to protect
419. Punishment for cheating by personation
420. Cheating and dishonestly inducing delivery of property

Fraudulent Deeds and Dispositions of Property
421. Dishonest or fraudulent removal or concealment of property to prevent distribution among creditors
422. Dishonestly or fraudulently preventing from being made available for his creditors a debt or demand due to the offender
423. Dishonest or fraudulent execution of deed of transfer containing a false statement of consideration
424. Dishonest or fraudulent removal or concealment of consideration

Mischief
425. Mischief
426. Punishment for committing mischief
427. Committing mischief and thereby causing damage to the amount of twenty-five ringgit
428. Mischief by killing or maiming any animal
429. (Deleted)
430. Mischief by injury to works of irrigation or by wrongfully diverting water
430A. Mischief affecting any public transportation
431. Mischief by injury to public road, bridge or river
431A. Mischief by injury to telegraph cable, wire, etc.
432. Mischief by causing inundation or obstruction to public drainage, attended with damage
433. Mischief by destroying or moving or rendering less useful a lighthouse or seamark, or by exhibiting false lights
434. Mischief by destroying or moving, etc., a landmark fixed by public authority
435. Mischief by fire or explosive substance with intent to cause damage to amount of fifty ringgit
436. Mischief by fire or explosive substance with intent to destroy a house, etc.
437. Mischief with intent to destroy or make unsafe a decked vessel or a vessel of 20 tons burden
438. Punishment for the mischief described in the last section when committed by fire or any explosive substance
439. Punishment for intentionally running vessel aground or ashore with intent to commit theft, etc.
440. Mischief occurring during disturbances, etc.

Criminal Trespass
441. Criminal trespass
442. House-trespass
443. Lurking house-trespass
444. (Deleted)
445. Housebreaking
446. (Deleted)
447. Punishment for criminal trespass
448. Punishment for house-trespass
449. House-trespass in order to commit an offence punishable with death
450. House-trespass in order to commit an offence punishable with imprisonment for life
451. House-trespass in order to commit an offence punishable with imprisonment
452. House-trespass after preparation made for causing hurt to any person
453. Punishment for lurking house-trespass or housebreaking
454. (Deleted)
455. Lurking house-trespass or housebreaking after preparation made for causing hurt to any person
456. (Deleted)
457. Lurking house-trespass or housebreaking by night in order to commit an offence punishable with imprisonment
457A. Subsequent offence under section 453 or 457 punishable with whipping after first offence
458. (Deleted)
459. Grievous hurt caused whilst committing lurking house-trespass or housebreaking
460. All persons jointly concerned in housebreaking, etc., to be punishable for death, or grievous hurt caused by one of their number
461. Dishonestly breaking open any closed receptacle containing or supposed to contain property
462. Punishment for same offence when committed by person entrusted with custody

=== Chapter XVIII: Offences Relating to Documents and to Currency Notes and Bank Notes ===
463. Forgery
464. Making a false document
465. Punishment for forgery
466. Forgery of a record of a Court, or public Register of Births, etc.
467. Forgery of a valuable security or will
468. Forgery for the purpose of cheating
469. Forgery for the purpose of harming the reputation of any person
470. “A forged document”
471. Using as genuine a forged document
472. Making or possessing a counterfeit seal, plate, etc., with intent to commit a forgery punishable under section 467
473. Making or possessing a counterfeit seal, plate, etc., with intent to commit a forgery punishable otherwise
474. Having possession of a valuable security or will know to be forged, with intent to use it as genuine
475. Counterfeiting a device or mark used for authenticating documents described in section 467, or possessing counterfeit marked material
476. Counterfeiting a device or mark used for authenticating documents other than those described in section 467 or possessing counterfeit marked material
477. Fraudulent cancellation, destruction, etc., of a will
477A. Falsification of accounts
(There are no ss. 478–489)

Currency Notes and Bank Notes
489A. Forging or counterfeiting currency notes or bank notes
489B. Using as genuine, forged or counterfeit currency notes or bank notes
489C. Possession of forged or counterfeit currency notes or bank notes
489D. Making or possessing instruments or materials for forging or counterfeiting currency notes or bank notes

=== Chapter XIX: Criminal Breach of Contracts of Service ===
490. (Deleted)
491. Breach of contract to attend on and supply the wants of helpless persons
492. (Deleted)

=== Chapter XX: Offences Relating to Marriage ===
493. Cohabitation caused by a man deceitfully inducing a belief of lawful marriage
494. Marrying again during the lifetime of husband or wife
495. Same offence with concealment of the former marriage from the person with whom subsequent marriage is contracted
496. Marriage ceremony gone through with fraudulent intent without lawful marriage
(There is no s. 497)
498. Enticing or taking away or detaining with a criminal intent a married woman

=== Chapter XXI: Defamation ===
499. Defamation
500. Punishment for defamation
501. Printing or engraving matter known to be defamatory
502. Sale of printed or engraved substance containing defamatory matter

=== Chapter XXII: Criminal Intimidation, Insult and Annoyance ===
503. Criminal intimidation
504. Intentional insult with intent to provoke a breach of the peace
505. Statements conducing to public mischief
506. Punishment for criminal intimidation
507. Criminal intimidation by an anonymous communication
508. Act caused by inducing a person to believe that he will be rendered an object of Divine displeasure
509. Word or gesture intended to insult the modesty of a person
510. Misconduct in public by a drunken person

=== Chapter XXIII: Attempts to Commit Offences ===
511. Punishment for attempting to commit offences punishable with imprisonment

== See also ==
- Criminal code
- Criminal law
- Law of Malaysia
