= Seksualiti Merdeka =

Annual festival in Malaysia

Seksualiti Merdeka is an annual sexuality rights festival held in Kuala Lumpur, Malaysia. Seksualiti Merdeka features a programme of talks, forums, workshops, art, theatre and music performances, interactive installations, and film screenings, organised by a coalition of Malaysian NGOs, artists and individuals. Merdeka is the name for Malaysia's Independence Day (Aug 31), hence Seksualiti Merdeka can be loosely translated as "Sexuality Independence".

== Overview ==
The first Seksualiti Merdeka was held in August 2008, coinciding with Merdeka celebrations. It drew a crowd of about 400–500 people.

The theme of Seksualiti Merdeka 2009 is “Our Bodies, Our Rights,” which reflects the organisers' wish to tie LGBT rights into the larger framework of human rights, based in part of the Yogyakarta Principles. It drew a crowd of 800–1000 people.

In November 2011, the festival was banned on the grounds that it could cause public disorder.

== Background ==
Seksualiti Merdeka was founded by arts programmer Pang Khee Teik and singer-songwriter Jerome Kugan in 2008. Pang and Jerome have previously been involved in LGBT advocacy, for example, in 2003, together with Shanon Shah, Tan Beng Hui, Toni Kasim, Jac SM Kee, and others, they were involved in the handing of a Memorandum to the Human Rights Commission on the negative portrayal of effeminate men and masculine women in the Malaysian media. As writers, they have also regularly written and read their gay stories in public.

In 2008, Clarence Singham, co-founder of Singapore's pride festival IndigNation, invited Pang to organise a Malaysian programme within it. Pang then organised a segment called "Heartbreak Heroes: Four Malaysians on surviving love, loss & a hostel in Singapore", in which Pang, Kugan, activist Jac SM Kee and historian Farish A. Noor read their original writings.

The experience inspired Pang and Kugan, who both work for The Annexe Gallery, to organise a similar kind of event within their arts space.

== Seksualiti Merdeka 2008 ==
The first Seksualiti Merdeka took place on 29–31 August 2008, with the tagline "If one of us ain't free, none of us are!". It was held in conjunction with Merdeka celebrations "to address the fact that 51 years after independence, not all Malaysians are free to be who they are."
