= Jac sm Kee =

Malaysian feminist activist and writer

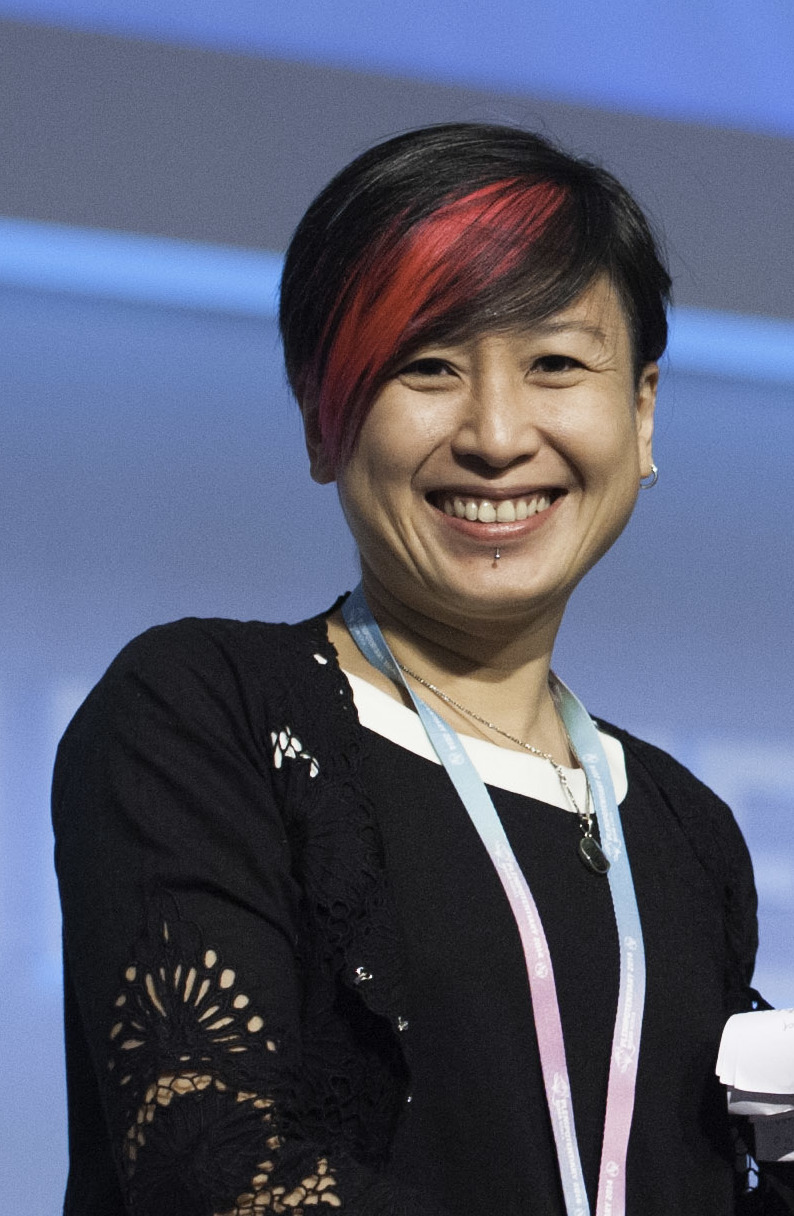
Jac sm Kee receiving the GEM-Tech award in 2014

Jac sm Kee (born 1976, Kuala Lumpur) is a feminist activist, writer and researcher from Malaysia. She led the Association for Progressive Communications Women's Rights Programme, which works to address online violence against women, advocates for feminist digital security, supports research on the intersection of digital technology and gender justice, and facilitates network and movement building on feminism and technology.

Jac sm Kee led the team that facilitated the development of the collectively drafted Feminist Principles of the Internet – a set of principles that outline the critical approach and issues that need to be considered in engaging and development of technology towards an ending of discrimination. She has conducted pioneering research that linked issues of internet governance, censorship, privacy, women's rights and sexuality.

She is one of the founders of the global and collaborative Take Back the Tech! campaign, which aims to combat digital gender violence by supporting and empowering women to take back control of technology. Jac sm Kee also co-founded Malaysia Design Archive together with Ezrena Marwan, a platform and initiative to trace and document Malaysia's visual history. In 2020, she co-founded Numun Fund, the first feminist tech fund for and from the Global South or "Larger World".

== Recognition ==
She is a selected winner of the Stieg Larsson Prize "for her struggle for women’s right to a free online environment and for an open and equal information society based on the potential of the internet."
