= National Blood Centre (Malaysia) =

- Pusat Darah Negara
- The Pusat Darah Negara logo

Agency overview
- Formed: 1955 as Blood Bank; 1999 as National Blood Centre
- Type: Health institution
- Jurisdiction: Ministry of Health (Malaysia)
- Headquarters: Jalan Tun Razak, 50400 Kuala Lumpur, Malaysia.; 3°10′23″N 101°42′22″E
- Motto: Derma Darah Menyelamatkan Nyawa (Donate Blood, Save Lives)
- Employees: ±500 staffs
- Minister responsible: Yang Berhormat Khairy Jamaluddin
- Agency executives: Afifah Haji Hassan, MD, Director; Tun Maizura Mohd Fathullah, MD, Deputy Director I; Nor Nazahah Mahmud, MD, Deputy Director II; Nur Sharezal Roslan, Deputy Director (Management)
- Website: https://pdn.gov.my/v2/

Footnotes
- Call: 03-2693 3888; Fax: 03-2698 0362

National Blood Centre of Malaysia (Malay language: Pusat Darah Negara; or its acronym, PDN) is a Malaysia’s premier blood centre for transfusion medicine and transplant.

== History ==
Blood Bank Services in Malaysia has been initiated by a group of women volunteers of British Red Cross in 1955. Initially, the service was open on Wednesdays from 5:00 pm to 5:30 pm at the Kuala Lumpur General Hospital. On this initiative, a total of 25 to 44 donors were collected every month. Donors at that time consisted of members of the police, military, and government personnel.

After 15 years of the start of the service, as much as 5,830 units of blood and no less than 13,860 successful compatibility tests were done. Due to the increasing need of the service, the blood centre was moved to another building at Hospital Kuala Lumpur in 1971. The building is known as "National Blood Service Center" and was inaugurated in April 1972 by the Director General of Health, Ministry of Health. The National Blood Service Centre was put under the Ministry of Health and chaired by a Director. The director was responsible for all the blood services that include donor recruitment, blood collection, processing, testing, inventory management, and clinical transfusion.

Starting in 1975, the Blood Services Center has played an important role in the standardization of work procedures, methodology, reagent and blood bank equipment in new facilities. In 2002, National Blood Centre was built in Jalan Tun Razak and it was inaugurated by the Prime Minister Mahathir Mohamad's wife Siti Hasmah Mohamad Ali.

=== Objectives ===
Creating and maintaining a safe blood donors. Provides blood, blood components that are safe, adequate and appropriate screening procedures in practice and storage in accordance with international standards. Ensure optimal patient care through the use of blood and blood products as appropriate. Establish and maintain cooperative relations through training, research and development in line with the needs of the practice and the latest technology in the medical field to date.

== See also ==
- Ministry of Health Malaysia
