= Death in custody =

A death in custody is a death of a person in the custody of the police or other authorities or while in prison. In the 21st century, death in custody remains a controversial subject, with the authorities often being accused of abuse, neglect and cover-ups of the causes of these deaths.

== By country ==
=== Australia ===
In Australia, deaths in custody automatically trigger an inquest.

=== Bangladesh ===
At least 32 people have died in "Operation Clean Heart" by the government of Bangladesh.

=== Germany ===
- Oury Jalloh
- Rosa Luxemburg

=== India ===
In the financial year 2021–22, the National Human Rights Commission reported 2152 deaths in judicial custody and 155 deaths in police custody.

=== Jamaica ===
"At least 650 people have been killed by police officers in Jamaica since 1999. Many of these have been blatantly unlawful killings, yet not one officer has been convicted since then." Piers Bannister, Amnesty International's Jamaica researcher.

=== Malaysia ===
- Kugan Ananthan
- Teoh Beng Hock
- Gunasegaran Rajasundram

=== The Netherlands ===
On the 27th of June 2015, Mitch Henriquez was arrested at the Malieveld in The Hague after he claimed to have a weapon. During the arrest he suffocated due to the chokehold of two police officers. They were put on trial and served sentences for manslaughter. After his death, there were several weeks of riots throughout the Netherlands.

=== Norway ===
About 40 people have died in police custody over a period of 20 years following 1990. Additionally there's been 45 suicides in custody over a 10-year period from 2008.

=== South Africa ===
South Africa has an unusually high level of deaths in custody. For example, in April to June 1997, there were 56 deaths in custody.

- Neil Aggett
- Richard Turner
- Steve Biko

=== Turkey ===
One of the most widely reported cases in Turkey was the death of teacher Gökhan Açıkkollu in police custody in August 2016, during the state of emergency declared after the failed coup attempt. His death drew attention from human rights organizations, political figures, and international bodies including the UN Human Rights Committee, which later found violations of the right to life and the prohibition of torture in his case. Similarly, in 2018, teacher Halime Gülsu - who suffered from lupus - died in prison after she was denied access to essential medication, a death that human rights organizations attribute to medical neglect.

=== United States ===
==== Definition of custody ====
The term "in custody" has been debated in both California v. Beheler (in regards to what constitutes custody in the requirement to read Miranda rights) but also in other federal court cases related to Miranda law and definition of custody. Although Miranda law has roughly defined custody as "a "formal arrest or restraint on freedom of movement" of the degree associated with a formal arrest." colloquial language may be less restrictive in the use of custody and is thus sometimes difficult to distinguish from the process of arrest. In addition to collecting data on those who have died in custody, the Bureau of Justice Statistics also tracks all deaths related to arrest. This aids in collecting data from the fringes of custody or attempts to arrest an individual.

==== Causes of death ====
The causes for death in police custody may range from suspected homicide by members of the police, killings by other inmates, death due to psychological or physical abuse, capital punishment, to suicide, accidental death, or natural causes. The United States Bureau of Justice Statistics collects data regarding both the cause of death, as well as medical and criminal records of those that die in police custody (restricted to those in federal prison and local jails).

==== Estimates ====
The Bureau of Justice Statistics estimates that 17,358 individuals in custody died during the period from 2007 to 2010. Other publications focus on the rate per 100,000. US jails report deaths that total a mortality rate of 128, and prisons at 264 per 100,000. There are differences in methodology used to obtain these statistics, as some jurisdictions include deaths during attempted arrests, while others do not.

Other research has focused on specific states, such as Maryland and the rate of death by identity (gender, race, age). Based on some findings, African-American males appear to be over-represented as victims of sudden custody deaths. Further research with larger sample sizes is necessary.

==== Watchdog organizations ====
The Marshall Project collects and produces reports on police killings as well as maintaining a curated list of links to articles and publications related to death in police custody in the United States.

==== Selected persons who have died in custody ====
- Sandra Bland (woman found hanging in her Waller County, Texas jail cell due to apparent suicide)
- Henry "Peg" Gilbert, shot in police custody in 1947 in Harris County, Georgia; the sheriff claimed self-defense, but Gilbert, a prosperous farmer, was found to have been severely beaten before being shot
- Freddie Gray (suffered injuries while being transported by police in Baltimore, Maryland, that led to a coma and his death)
- Stephen Kovacs (died by suicide in New Jersey prison cell)
- Michael Tyree (a mentally ill inmate held in a California county jail was beaten to death by three guards, who were convicted in June 2017 of his death)
- Elliott Williams (died in his Tulsa County, Oklahoma jail cell due to complications from multiple injuries)
- Missouri State Penitentiary riot (death of four inmates)
- New Mexico State Penitentiary riot (33 inmate deaths and over 200 injuries)
- Darren Rainey (scalded to death in shower at Dade Correctional Institution in 2012)
- Jeffrey Epstein died August 10, 2019, at the Metropolitan Correctional Center, New York due to alleged suicide, although this has been subject to conspiracy theories.
- Ruby Evans (blunt force trama) Lee Arrendale State Prison

==== Foreign custody by American agents (police, military, etc.) ====
===== International custody law =====
There are numerous laws and international treaties regarding treatment of foreigners, especially during wartime, of which the Geneva Convention is the most widely recognized and internationally ratified. It contains provisions that classify and define both prisoners of war (as well as civilians and the wounded or infirm) and the manner in which they are to be treated. These include but are not limited to: murder, mutilation, hostage taking, and outrages upon personal dignity. These ratified documents are the base of US international custody law and can be seen to be misapplied in some of the proceeding cases.

===== Examples of persons who have died in custody =====
- Jamal Naseer (Afghan soldier allegedly beaten to death by US forces)
- Nagem Hatab (Iraqi killed by elements and possible heart attack)
- Manadel al-Jamadi (suspected terrorist tortured and killed)

== See also ==
- Capital punishment in the United States
- Detention
- Infectious diseases within American prisons
- Life imprisonment
- Prison overcrowding in the United States
- Prisoner rights in the United States
- Private prison
- War on drugs
- Extrajudicial killing
- List of prison deaths
- Police brutality
- Prisoner suicide
- Capital punishment
- Institutional racism
- African-American family structure#Black male incarceration and mortality
- Category:People who died in police custody
- Category:People who died in prison custody
- List of killings by law enforcement officers in the United States
- List of freedom indices
