= Death of Aminulrasyid Amzah =

In the early morning of 26 April 2010, 14-year-old Malaysian student Aminulrasyid Amzah was fatally shot by Royal Malaysian Police officers.

== Background ==
Aminulrasyid Amzah (c. August 1995 – 26 April 2010) was a 14-year-old Malaysian student from Shah Alam, Selangor.

== Incident ==
According to the testimony of Amzah's friend, with whom he had spent the previous evening, the pair had been drinking in Section 7, Shah Alam, before Amzah "grazed" a car while driving. They drove to Amzah's home in Section 11, where they were chased by five motorcyclists. Fleeing in their car, they began to be pursued by a Royal Malaysian Police car which shot at their vehicle, puncturing the tyres and fatally hitting Amzah in the head.

Amzah was shot at 02:00 MST; it is alleged that he attempted to reverse his car into the policemen.

== Reaction ==
=== Media ===
The shooting made national headlines, and the subsequent public outcry resulted in the Home Ministry establishing a special panel led by Deputy Home Minister Abu Seman Yusop to investigate.

=== Political ===
Both the federal governing coalition Barisan Nasional (traditionally associated with the police) and their opponents the Selangor governing coalition Pakatan Rakyat (who offered assistance to his family) received allegations of politicization after Aminulrasyid's death. Opposition leader Karpal Singh was later appointed counsel for Aminulrasyid's family. A number of Pakatan Rakyat politicians also asked the Inspector-General of Police to resign as a result of the shooting.

=== Legal case ===
After police corporal Jenain Subi was initially convicted, the legal case reached the Malaysian High Court, where evidence showed the boy was shot at over 20 times. Police Corporal Jenain Subi subsequently had his conviction overturned, an action that was branded "unfair" by members of Aminulrasyid's family. After the verdict, the Inspector-General of Police refused to offer an apology to Aminulrasyid's family, but police corporal Jenain Subi did offer a personal apology to them.

== See also ==
- Kugan Ananthan
- Gunasegaran Rajasundram
- Ahmad Sarbani Mohamed
- Teoh Beng Hock
- George Floyd
- Rayshard Brooks
- Breonna Taylor
- Killing of Michael Brown
- Killing of Oscar Grant
- Death of Lei Yang
- Beating of Ken Tsang
