= Ahmad Said Hamdan =

Malaysian civil servant (died 2019)

Yang Berbahagia Dato' Seri Ahmad Said Hamdan PJN DGPN SPDK SSAP DCSM DPMP DSPN PGDK SMS KMN
- أحمد سيد بن حمدان

1st Chief Commissioner of the Malaysian Anti-Corruption Commission
- In office 14 May 2007 – 31 December 2009
- Nominated by: Abdullah Ahmad Badawi
- Appointed by: Mizan Zainal Abidin
- Deputy: Abu Kassim Mohamed
- Preceded by: Zulkipli Mat Noor (as Director-General of Anti-Corruption Agency)
- Succeeded by: Abu Kassim Mohamed

Personal details
- Born: Ahmad Said bin Hamdan; 26 May 1952 Balik Pulau, George Town, Penang, Federation of Malaya
- Died: 22 September 2019 (aged 67) Rawang, Gombak, Selangor, Malaysia
- Resting place: Kota Damansara Muslim Cemetery, Kota Damansara, Petaling Jaya, Petaling, Selangor, Malaysia
- Citizenship: Malaysian
- Education: University of Science, Malaysia; Indiana State University

Ahmad Said bin Hamdan (Jawi: أحمد سيد بن حمدان; died 22 September 2019) was a Malaysian civil servant who served as the first chief commissioner of the Malaysian Anti-Corruption Commission (MACC) when it was created from the preceding Anti-Corruption Agency (ACA).

== Career ==
Ahmad Said succeeded Zulkipli Mat Noor as director-general of the ACA in mid-May 2007 after the latter's contract was not renewed amidst graft allegations. When the ACA was upgraded into a full commission body known as the MACC, Ahmad Said was in turn, made its first chief commissioner.

On 4 December 2009, the Chief Secretary to the Government of Malaysia, Mohd Sidek Hassan, announced that Ahmad Said has opted for early retirement at the end of 2009 with his contract due to expire in May 2010. His term officially came to an end on 31 December 2009 instead of 25 May 2010. On the following day, he released a statement denying that his early retirement was due to pressure from outsiders or political parties. He added that his retirement was due to his personal reasons and on account of having served in the commission for a long period rather than because of other reasons. Ahmad Said said he retired early to give way to his successor and to spend time with his family after serving with the MACC for 34 years. Then-prime minister, Mohd Najib Abdul Razak, also reiterated that Ahmad Said retired early because he wanted to spend more time with his family and that it had nothing to do with the journalist Teoh Beng Hock's death. The government also did not request him to retire 6 months earlier.

== Death ==
Ahmad Said died on the night of 22 September 2019 at his daughter's house in Rawang. He had previously been admitted to the National Heart Institute of Malaysia (IJN) after suffering a stroke.

== Honours ==
- Malaysia
  - Commander of the Order of Meritorious Service (PJN) – Datuk (2008)
  - Officer of the Order of the Defender of the Realm (KMN) (1992)
- Malacca
  - Knight Commander of the Exalted Order of Malacca (DCSM) – Datuk Wira (2009)
- Pahang
  - Knight Grand Companion of the Order of Sultan Ahmad Shah of Pahang (SSAP) – Dato' Sri (2008)
- Penang
  - Commander of the Order of the Defender of State (DGPN) – Dato' Seri (2008)
  - Officer of the Order of the Defender of State (DSPN) – Dato' (1999)
- Perlis
  - Knight Commander of the Order of the Crown of Perlis (DPMP) – Dato' (2002)
- Sabah
  - Grand Commander of the Order of Kinabalu (SPDK) – Datuk Seri Panglima (2007)
  - Commander of the Order of Kinabalu (PGDK) – Datuk (2000)
- Selangor
  - Companion of the Order of the Crown of Selangor (SMS) (1999)

== See also ==
- Tan Boon Wah v. Datuk Seri Ahmad Said Hamdan, Ketua Suruhanjaya, Suruhanjaya Pencegahan Rasuah Malaysia and Others
