= Article Nine =

Article Nine, generally the 9th article of any constitution or treaty, may refer to:

- Article 9 of the Japanese Constitution
- Article 9 ECHR
- Article 9 of the Constitution of Singapore
