= Zeki Güven =

Turkish intelligence officer (1970-2018)

- Born: 1 February 1970; Turkey
- Died: 1 July 2018 (aged 48); Sincan Prison, Ankara, Turkey
- Occupation: Police Chief
- Known for: Ankara Intelligence Branch Directorate

Zeki Güven (1 February 1970 – 1 July 2018) was a member of the Turkish General Directorate of Security and former Head of the Ankara Intelligence Branch. In 2018, he was arrested on allegations related to the Gülen movement and was found dead approximately 40 days into his detention in a single-person cell at Ankara Sincan Prison.

His death was officially reported by authorities as a "heart attack"; however, various media outlets and alternative reports have raised questions regarding the circumstances.

== Life and education ==
Zeki Güven was born on 1 February 1970. He studied at the Police College and Police Academy. It is reported that he graduated from the Police Academy in 1992 as the top student of his class.

He was married and had two children.

== Professional career ==
Güven served within the General Directorate of Security, particularly in intelligence units. He worked as Head of the Ankara Intelligence Branch and deputy director of Bolu Police Department.

According to various sources, he took part in counter-terrorism and intelligence operations throughout his career.

In some investigations, his name was mentioned; in particular, he was allegedly associated with illegal wiretapping cases and processes referred to in the public as the "tape conspiracy."

== Investigation and arrest ==
Following the coup attempt on 15 July 2016, He was arrested in Eskişehir on 22 May 2018 and subsequently detained in Sincan Prison in Ankara.

== Prison process ==
It is stated that Güven spent approximately 40 days in prison and was held in a single-person cell.

Various allegations have been made regarding prison conditions, including solitary confinement and lack of access to healthcare services.

== Death ==
Zeki Güven was found dead on 1 July 2018 in his cell at Sincan Prison in Ankara.

Authorities stated that the cause of death was a heart attack.

== Allegations and controversy ==
Different claims have been made regarding Güven's death:

The Tenkil Memorial database classified the cause of death as "assassination."

The YitenCanlar platform described the incident as a "suspicious death" and "unsolved case."

Analyses published by TR724 suggested that his death should be evaluated in a broader investigative context.

Additional claims include:

- lack of adequate medical care
- delayed emergency response
- no known prior heart condition

== Legal process ==
Various petitions and requests for investigation were filed regarding his death. Official assessments concluded that the death was due to natural causes.

== In the media ==
A documentary about Zeki Güven's life and death: https://www.youtube.com/watch?v=CnpDE0ReIM8
