= Loh Wai Kong v Malaysia =

Landmark lawsuit

Loh Wai Kong v Government of Malaysia (1979) 2 MLJ 33 was a case heard in the Federal Court of Malaysia. Loh Wai Kong sought a ruling from the courts that Malaysian citizens were entitled to travel overseas as a fundamental right under Article 5 of the Constitution. The Federal Court ruled that no such right existed.

== Background ==
Loh was a permanent resident of Australia. He returned to Malaysia in April 1975, and was charged with a criminal offense in the High Court at Ipoh on 2 August 1976. Loh obtained bail on condition that he surrender his passport. On 2 March 1977, his passport expired, and Loh had it returned. He later applied for a new passport, citing the need to return to Australia by 1978, or his resident visa there would expire. The authorities rejected the application, saying that he was involved in a criminal case and that the issuance of a passport was at the discretion of the Yang di-Pertuan Agong (King). Loh then filed suit in the High Court at Penang, asking the court to compel the government to issue him a passport, on the grounds that the right to travel abroad is a fundamental liberty protected by the Constitution.

The High Court rejected Loh's application, but made a number of statements in its ruling which the government disagreed with. In particular, the trial judge held that the phrase "personal liberty" in Article 5 of the Constitution included the right to leave the country, and that the refusal to issue a passport constituted an infringement of the right to personal liberty. The government thus appealed to the Federal Court for clarification.

In the Federal Court, Loh's lawyer said that although Loh did not have an absolute right to a passport, he did have a qualified right on condition of good character. The government responded that no such right, absolute or qualified, existed.

== Judgment ==
The judgment penned by Lord President Tun Mohamed Suffian Mohamed Hashim held that the Constitution is silent as to the right to travel overseas, although it refers to the right to travel and reside within the country. Suffian noted the Indian case of Satwant Singh Sawhney v D Ramarathnam, where the Indian courts held that Article 21 of the Constitution of India — roughly corresponding with the Malaysian Article 5 — does include the right to travel abroad. However, he cited with approval the minority judgment in the case, and stated that the issuance of passports was a prerogative of the Malaysian government, concluding:

To sum up, "personal liberty" in article 5 means liberty relating to or concerning the person or body of the individual; that article does not confer on the citizen a fundamental right to leave the country. On the contrary, the Government may stop a person from leaving the country if, for instance, there are criminal charges pending against him.

== See also ==
- Lee Kwan Woh v. Public Prosecutor
- Pihak Berkuasa Negeri Sabah v. Sugumar Balakrishnan & Another
- Tan Tek Seng v. Suruhanjaya Perkhidmatan Pendidikan & Another
