= Tan Tek Seng v Suruhanjaya Perkhidmatan Pendidikan =

Tan Tek Seng v Suruhanjaya Perkhidmatan Pendidikan & Another [1996] 1 MLJ 261 was a case heard in the Court of Appeal of Malaysia. The case concerned the allegedly wrongful dismissal of Tan Tek Seng, a senior assistant of a primary school. In ruling in his favour, the Court of Appeal held that Articles 5 and 8 of the Constitution, which protect personal liberty and equality under the law, must be read with a liberal and not literal approach. In his judgment, Gopal Sri Ram held:

[Judges] should, when discharging their duties as interpreters of the supreme law, adopt a liberal approach in order to implement the true intention of the framers of the Federal Constitution. Such an objective may only be achieved if the expression 'life' in art 5(1) is given a broad and liberal meaning. ... [Article 5(1) means] all those facets that are an integral part of life itself and those matters which go to form the quality of life.

Since Tan was deprived of gainful employment without a fair hearing, under this broad interpretation of Article 5, his dismissal was wrongful and unconstitutional. In 1997, the Federal Court cited the decision with approval as part of an obiter dictum in R. Rama Chandran v. The Industrial Court of Malaysia. However, when ruling directly on the interpretation of Article 5 in 2002, the Federal Court held in Pihak Berkuasa Negeri Sabah v. Sugumar Balakrishnan & Another that a generous reading of the term "personal liberty" in Article 5 was in error. The Federal Court later revisited the issue in 2009, and ruled in Lee Kwan Woh v. Public Prosecutor that constitutional rights, including those under Article 5, must be read in a generous and liberal fashion.

== See also ==
- Loh Wai Kong v. Government of Malaysia
