= Tan Boon Wah v Ahmad Said =

Tan Boon Wah v. Datuk Seri Ahmad Said Hamdan, Ketua Suruhanjaya, Suruhanjaya Pencegahan Rasuah Malaysia and Others
- Court: High Court of Malaya at Kuala Lumpur
- Decided: 19 November 2009
- Citation: [2009] MLJU 1725

Case history
- Prior action: Application filed on 22 July 2009
- Subsequent action: Appeal filed by Attorney General

Holding
- Night-time interrogation ruled illegal; damages awarded for false imprisonment

Court membership
- Judge sitting: Mohamad Ariff Md Yusof (Judicial Commissioner)

Case opinions
- Interrogation by MACC must be during office hours only; night-time questioning violates Article 5 of the Constitution

Keywords
- Personal liberty, constitutional rights, MACC Act, "day to day", unlawful detention

Tan Boon Wah v. Datuk Seri Ahmad Said Hamdan, Ketua Suruhanjaya, Suruhanjaya Pencegahan Rasuah Malaysia and Others was a case decided in the High Court at Kuala Lumpur in Malaysia in 2009. The High Court for the first time defined the meaning of the phrase "day to day" in law, applying it specifically to the Malaysian Anti-Corruption Commission Act. Ruling that "day to day" refers to general office hours, the High Court held that it was illegal to interrogate suspects or prisoners during the night time, and that doing so violated Article 5 of the Constitution, which protects personal liberty.

== Background ==
Tan Boon Wah is a Municipal Councillor for Kajang. On 15 July 2009, Tan and Selangor state government aide Teoh Beng Hock were brought by the Malaysian Anti-Corruption Commission (MACC) to their Selangor headquarters for questioning in connection with allegations of graft against the Selangor government. Both Tan and Teoh were interrogated late into the night. After Tan's interrogation concluded in the early hours of 16 July, the MACC told him to go home and return for further questioning at 11 in the morning. Tan decided to stay overnight at the MACC office. Teoh, who was also sleeping there, later fell to his death from the MACC office block; his death is the subject of an ongoing inquest. Teoh's case prompted the announcement of a Royal Commission of inquiry into the MACC's investigation procedures, to be formed after the conclusion of the inquest.

Tan alleged that the MACC had detained both him and Teoh overnight, and that this was a violation of their civil liberties. Tan filed suit against the MACC in the Kuala Lumpur High Court on 22 July, claiming that the phrase "day to day" in Section 30 (3) (a) of the MACC Act permits interrogation during regular office hours, and not 24-hour interrogation. Although there was dispute as to whether Tan and Teoh were actually detained, and the specific hours during which they had been interviewed, the MACC submitted that it had interrogated Tan from 9.45pm on 15 July to 2.53am on 16 July, and this was accepted by Tan for the purposes of the case. He was represented by Karpal Singh. The MACC was represented by senior federal counsel Noorin Badaruddin.

== Judgment ==
On 19 November 2009, Judicial Commissioner Mohamad Ariff Md Yusof handed down his judgment. The ruling noted that the MACC Act itself does not define the term "day to day", which appears in section 30 (3) (a):

A person to whom an order has been given under paragraph (1) (a) shall attend in accordance with the terms of the order to be examined orally to assist investigations, and shall continue to attend from day to day where so directed [by the MACC] until the examination is completed.

The meaning of the term was as such subject to judicial interpretation. Relying on the Oxford English Dictionary, Mohamad Ariff stated: "Looking at the definition under the Oxford Dictionary 'day to day' means daily. It does not mean 24 hours a day but at any time of the day. Hence, it should mean within normal working hours as stipulated between 8.30am and 5.30pm." Mohamad Ariff rejected the argument that "day to day" could permit "round the clock" interrogation, stating that this would "offend the legislative purpose" of the law, and violate the fundamental liberties of the person as guaranteed by Article 5 of the Constitution, citing the recent case of Lee Kwan Woh v. Public Prosecutor, where the Federal Court held that constitutional liberties must be read in the "widest sense" possible.

Mohamad Ariff thus held that Tan had suffered false imprisonment, and ordered the MACC to pay damages for the time between 9.45pm and 2.53am during which Tan had been detained. The specific damages will be calculated by the High Court senior assistant registrar.

== Response ==
Tan welcomed the decision, saying: "What is important is that no one should be subjected to such interrogation late at night. This is a victory for all Malaysians." His lawyer, Karpal, called the ruling a landmark decision: "This affects across the board every investigation in the country; every police investigation and even the Criminal Procedure Code. ... For the first time, we get a definitive ruling to the phrase 'day to day'." Karpal approvingly cited the Lock-Up Rules, which only allow the interrogation of prisoners between 6.30am and 6.30pm, and noted that the decision meant Teoh's family could sue the MACC for his false imprisonment as well. According to Karpal:

Under the Public Authorities Protection Act, civil liability on the government is limited to three years. Hence, witnesses for the past three years, who have been unlawfully detained and where interrogations were conducted after office hours could file for damages.

Democratic Action Party Parliamentary leader and former Opposition Leader Lim Kit Siang publicly lamented that "Teoh Beng Hock would not have died if MACC had followed the law" and interrogated him during the day. Noorin Badaruddin, acting for the MACC, told the press that she had received instructions from the Attorney General to appeal the decision.
