= Halime Gulsu =

Turkish English teacher who died in prison (c. 1984–2018)

Halime Gülsu
- Born: October 3, 1984; Turkey
- Died: April 28, 2018 (aged 34); Tarsus Prison, Mersin, Turkey
- Occupation: English teacher
- Known for: Becoming a symbol of alleged medical neglect in detention following the post-2016 crackdown.

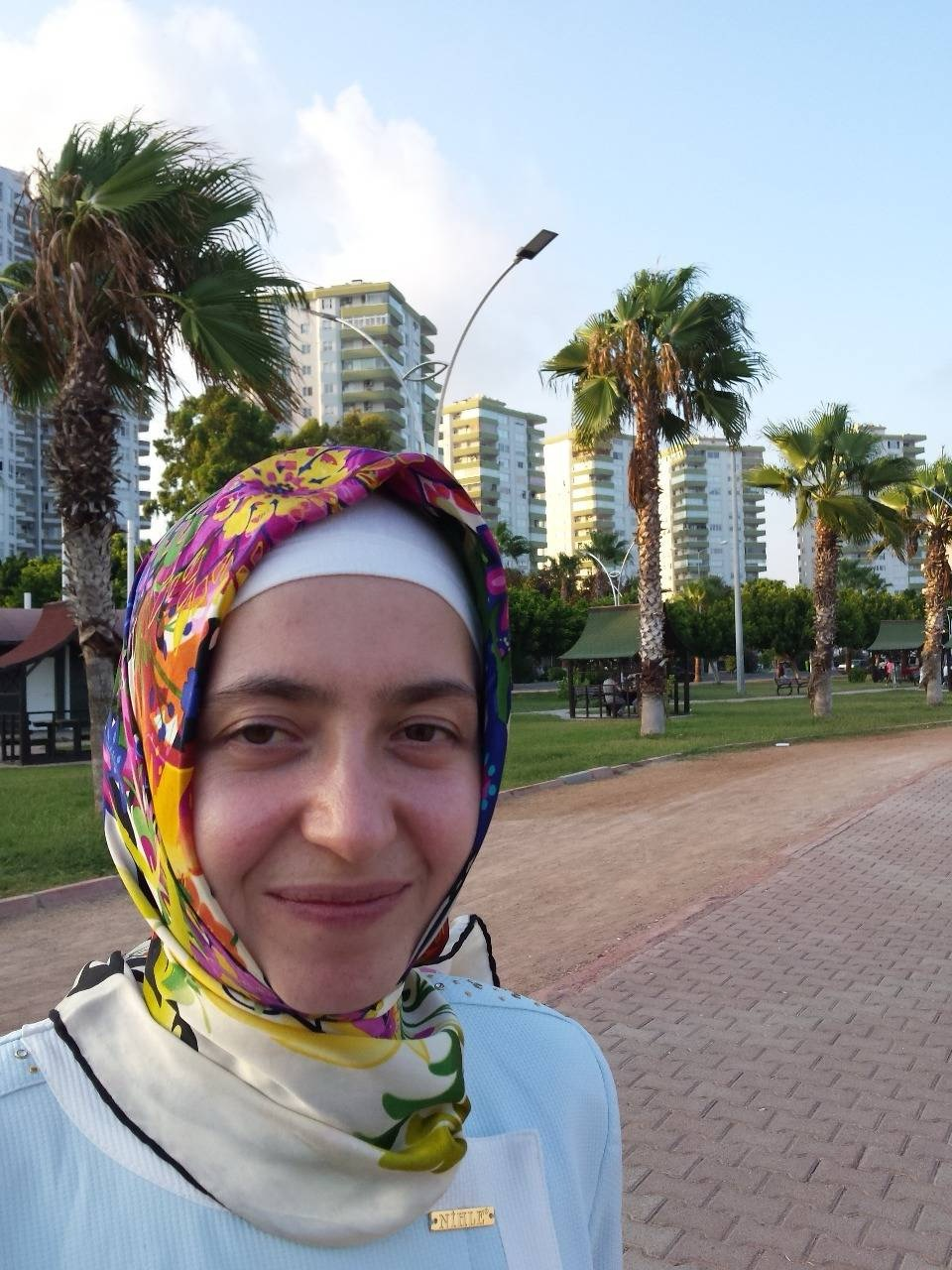
Halime Gülsu

Halime Gülsu (commonly spelled Gulsu in English sources; c. 03 October 1984 – 28 April 2018) was a Turkish English teacher who died in prison under controversial circumstances. Arrested during the post-2016 purges over alleged links to the Gülen movement, Gülsu reportedly died due to a lack of access to essential medication for her chronic autoimmune condition, Systemic Lupus Erythematosus (SLE). Her death has been cited by human rights organizations as emblematic of alleged systemic neglect and abuse in Turkish detention facilities.

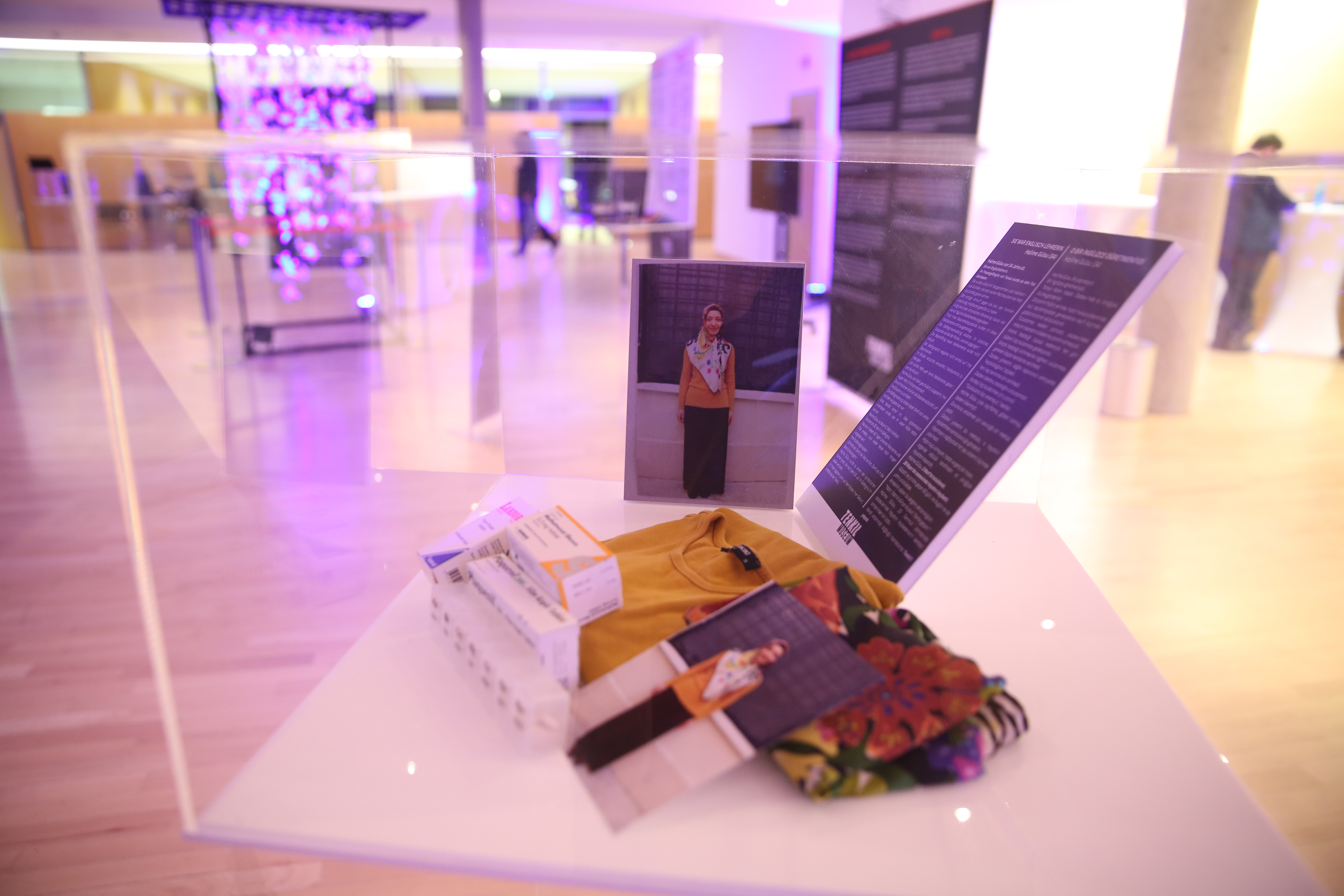
The belongings of Halime Gülsu, who died in prison on April 28, 2018, due to the denial of her medication, are exhibited at the Tenkil Museum in Hanau, Germany

== Background ==
Halime Gülsu was a dedicated English teacher from Mersin, Turkey. She was described as devout and active in her community, reportedly offering support to families affected by the mass arrests following the 2016 Turkish coup d'état attempt. Gülsu was arrested on 20 February 2018 and charged with "membership in a terrorist organization" due to alleged affiliations with the Gülen movement.

== Imprisonment and death ==
At the time of her arrest, Gülsu was reportedly suffering from SLE, a severe chronic autoimmune disease requiring regular treatment and medication. According to various reports and testimonies, she was denied access to essential medication while in detention. Former cellmates claim she was left without treatment for 15 days and experienced worsening health, including repeated episodes of vomiting and pain. Gülsu died on 28 April 2018 in Tarsus Prison, Mersin, after 67 days in detention. Her death triggered significant reaction on social media and from civil society figures, particularly those critical of prison conditions in Turkey during the post-coup emergency period.

== Aftermath and reaction ==
Gülsu's death led to public outcry and condemnation from human rights organizations and MPs, with criticism aimed at Turkey's prison health system. Advocates of Silenced Turkey and Broken Chalk have cited her case as a symbol of medical neglect in custody. Her brother, Irfan Gülsu, who now lives in Canada, has campaigned internationally on her behalf and called for accountability.

In 2022, a book titled Halime Gülsu: Nasıl Öldürüldüm? ("Halime Gülsu: How I Was Killed") was published by Zeynep Kayadelen in collaboration with Advocates of Silenced Turkey. The work features letters and testimonies asserting systemic negligence and details surrounding her final weeks in prison.

== UN Human Rights Committee Involvement ==
Upon an application made by IAHRAG, the UN Human Rights Committee formally recognized the case against Turkey. Thereafter, the committee called for the submission of a response by the government of Turkey on the issue of the negligence involved in the death of Gülsu.

== Controversies ==
Although many human rights groups allege that Gülsu died from deliberate medical neglect, Turkish authorities disputed these claims.

The Mersin Chief Public Prosecutor's Office stated that medications had been provided and no neglect had occurred.

Despite this, contradictory evidence from media organizations, such as Bold Medya, claims that her medical reports were lost or hidden and her treatment was obstructed. The prosecutor's own documents reportedly referred to her as "maktül" (victim of homicide), further fueling concerns about a cover-up.

External videos
- Irfan Gülsu's speech on human rights for Halime Gülsu (YouTube)

Following Halime Gülsu's death in prison, her brother İrfan Gülsu stated that she suffered from a chronic medical condition and was allegedly denied the medication she regularly required. He claimed that, despite the family repeatedly notifying the authorities, adequate medical care was not provided and that this negligence contributed to her death. İrfan Gülsu described the situation as a serious human rights violation.

== Legacy ==
Halime Gülsu has become a symbol in human rights discourse in Turkey, with her story used to highlight the broader issues of medical neglect, political imprisonment, and erosion of legal protections during the post-coup emergency rule. Human rights organizations, independent media, and diaspora communities keep her memory alive and call for further investigation into her death.

== See also ==
- Human rights in Turkey
- 2016 Turkish purges
- Deaths in custody
