= Pihak Berkuasa Negeri Sabah v Sugumar Balakrishnan =

Pihak Berkuasa Negeri Sabah v Sugumar Balakrishnan & Another (2002) 4 CLJ 105 was a case heard in the Federal Court of Malaysia. Sugumar Balakrishnan sought the reinstatement of his entry permit to the state of Sabah. The Federal Court ultimately ruled that the right to personal liberty guaranteed by Article 5 of the Constitution cannot be construed in broad, generous terms, and as such denied Sugumar's application.

== Background ==
Sugumar had applied to the High Court for a writ of certiorari to quash the decision of the Sabah state government which revoked his entry permit on grounds of morality. The High Court held that the ouster clause in section 59a of the Immigration Act 1959/63 meant the courts had no grounds for judicial review of the Sabah government's decision.

Sugumar appealed to the Court of Appeal, which overruled the High Court and granted the writ he sought. The Court of Appeal held that ouster clauses are unconstitutional except in cases of national security (such as those involving the Internal Security Act) or overriding national interest. The preclusion of the right to judicial review was a violation of Article 5 of the Constitution, which was to be read in a broad manner, in line with Tan Tek Seng v. Suruhanjaya Perkhidmatan Pendidikan & Another. The Court of Appeal further ruled that Parliament had not intended to give the East Malaysian states of Sabah and Sarawak untrammeled discretion to cancel entry permits. The Sabah authorities then appealed to the Federal Court.

== Judgment ==
The Federal Court quashed the Court of Appeal decision. With regard to the Immigration Act, Federal Justice Mohamed Dzaiddin held:

By deliberately spelling out that there shall be no judicial review by the court of any act or decision of the Minister or the decision–maker except for non-compliance of any procedural requirement, Parliament must have intended that the section is conclusive on the exclusion of judicial review under the Act.

The Federal Court also overruled the Court of Appeal ruling on the broad interpretation of Article 5 liberties in Tan Tek Seng:

...we therefore disagree with the Court of Appeal that the words "personal liberty" should be generously interpreted to include all those facets that are an integral part of life itself and those matters which go to form the quality of life. ... We agree with the learned State Attorney General that the entry permit only allows the respondent to enter and reside in Sabah, but ipso facto the entry permit does not confer any right to livelihood to the respondent.

In 2009, the Federal Court would go on to reverse itself in Lee Kwan Woh v. Public Prosecutor, holding that constitutional liberties must be read generously and not literally.

== See also ==
- Loh Wai Kong v. Government of Malaysia
