= Tenkil Museum =

- Established: 2019
- Location: Itinerant (based in Frankfurt, Germany)
- Type: Memory museum, human rights
- Collection size: Personal belongings, letters, digital archive
- Founder: Tenkil Museum Association
- Website: tenkilmuseum.com tenkilmemorial.org

Tenkil Museum is a traveling memory museum that documents deaths, alleged human-rights violations, exile, torture, and disappearances in Turkey, beginning with developments in 2013 and continuing after the 15 July 2016 Turkish coup attempt.

== Origins and founding ==
Major European cities where Tenkil Museum exhibitions have been held

The Tenkil Museum is a civil society initiative based in Germany, founded primarily by exiled journalists from Turkey. The museum stages exhibitions in various European cities and uses personal belongings and testimonies to document human-rights concerns. Among those whose lives and experiences have been documented in Tenkil Museum exhibitions are Gökhan Açıkkollu and Halime Gülsu who lost their life in jail due to torture or medical negligence.

== The concept of tenkil ==
The term tenkil is of Ottoman Turkish origin and refers to punishing, removing, or eliminating a group in a way intended to serve as a warning to others. The museum uses the term to symbolize the mass purges that began in 2013.

== Tenkil Memorial ==
Tenkil Memorial maintains a memorial database documenting deaths and alleged human-rights violations linked to the Tenkil period. These include deaths in detention, deaths from illness, deaths in exile, workplace accidents, suicides, drownings during crossings of the Aegean Sea and Maritsa River, and reported abductions.

== Selected memorial cases photo gallery ==
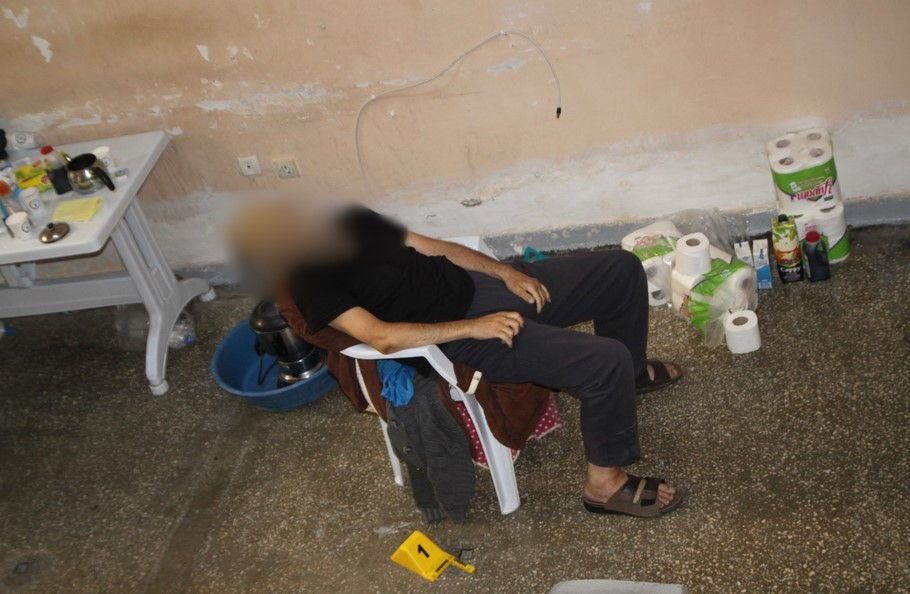
Mustafa Kabakçıoğlu died on 29 August 2020 in a quarantine cell at Gümüşhane Prison, and his death drew attention to poor prison conditions and alleged neglect.

On 18 July 2018, Hatice Akçabay and her three sons, Ahmet Esat, Mesut, and Bekir Aras, drowned when their boat capsized while trying to cross the Meriç River into Greece.

== Exhibitions and collection ==
The museum held its first exhibition in Frankfurt, Germany, at Klapperfeld, a former Gestapo prison from the Nazi era. Because of its format and commemorative role, it has been compared with dictatorship museums in Latin America and Nazi-era memorial sites in Germany.

The museum’s collection includes personal items belonging to people who died while migrating, prison letters, and diplomas and badges belonging to individuals dismissed under emergency decrees. The exhibitions are not held in a permanent venue but have taken place at temporary locations, including:

- Frankfurt, Germany, at Klapperfeld Prison
- Limburg, Belgium
- Kassel, Germany
- Brussels, Belgium, in connection with European Parliament events
- Helsinki, Finland, in connection with the World Village Festival
- Hanau Germany: On 7 February 2026, the Tenkil Museum opened its latest traveling exhibition "The Tenkil Catastrophe: Confronting and Healing" in Hanau, Germany.

== Reactions ==
Some Turkish officials and critics of the Gülen movement have described activities such as the Tenkil Museum as attempts to politicize the post-2016 purges. They have also characterized such initiatives in Germany and other countries as being linked to Gülen movement-related networks and have called for them to be restricted or blocked.

== Examples from the museum's collection ==
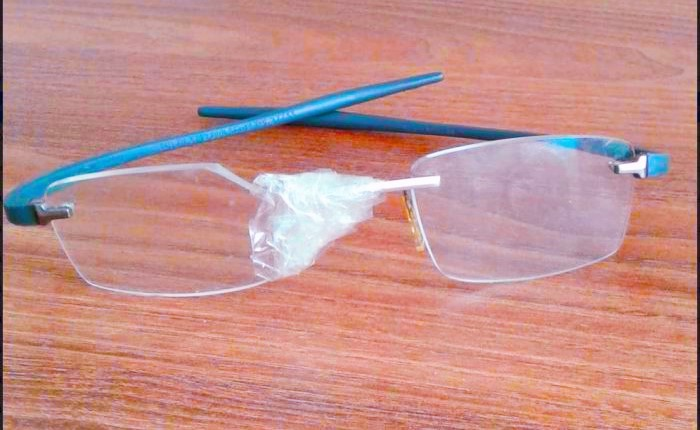
The broken glasses of Gökhan Açıkkollu, who died in custody.

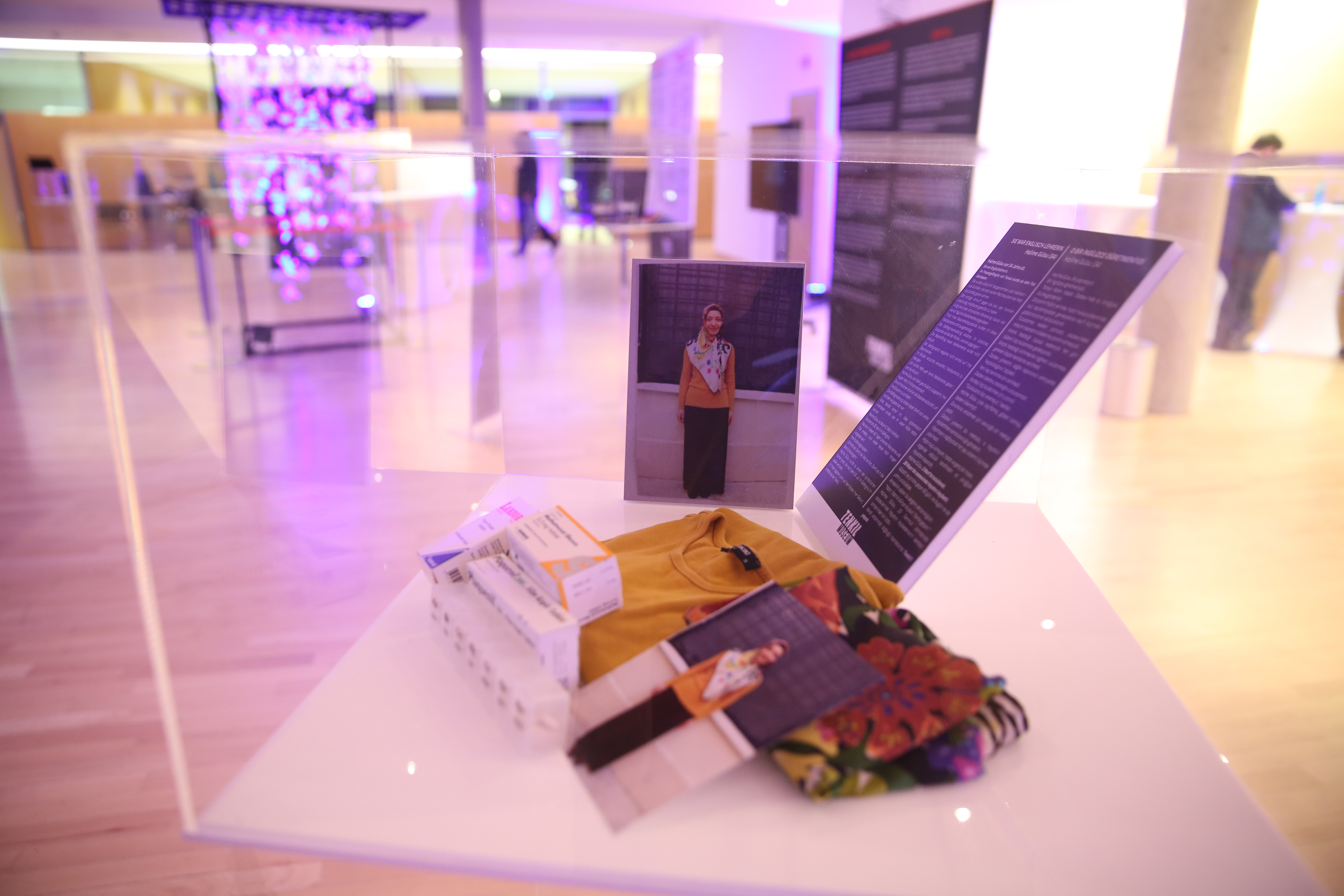
The belongings of Halime Gülsu, who died in prison on February 25, 2018, because she was not given her medication

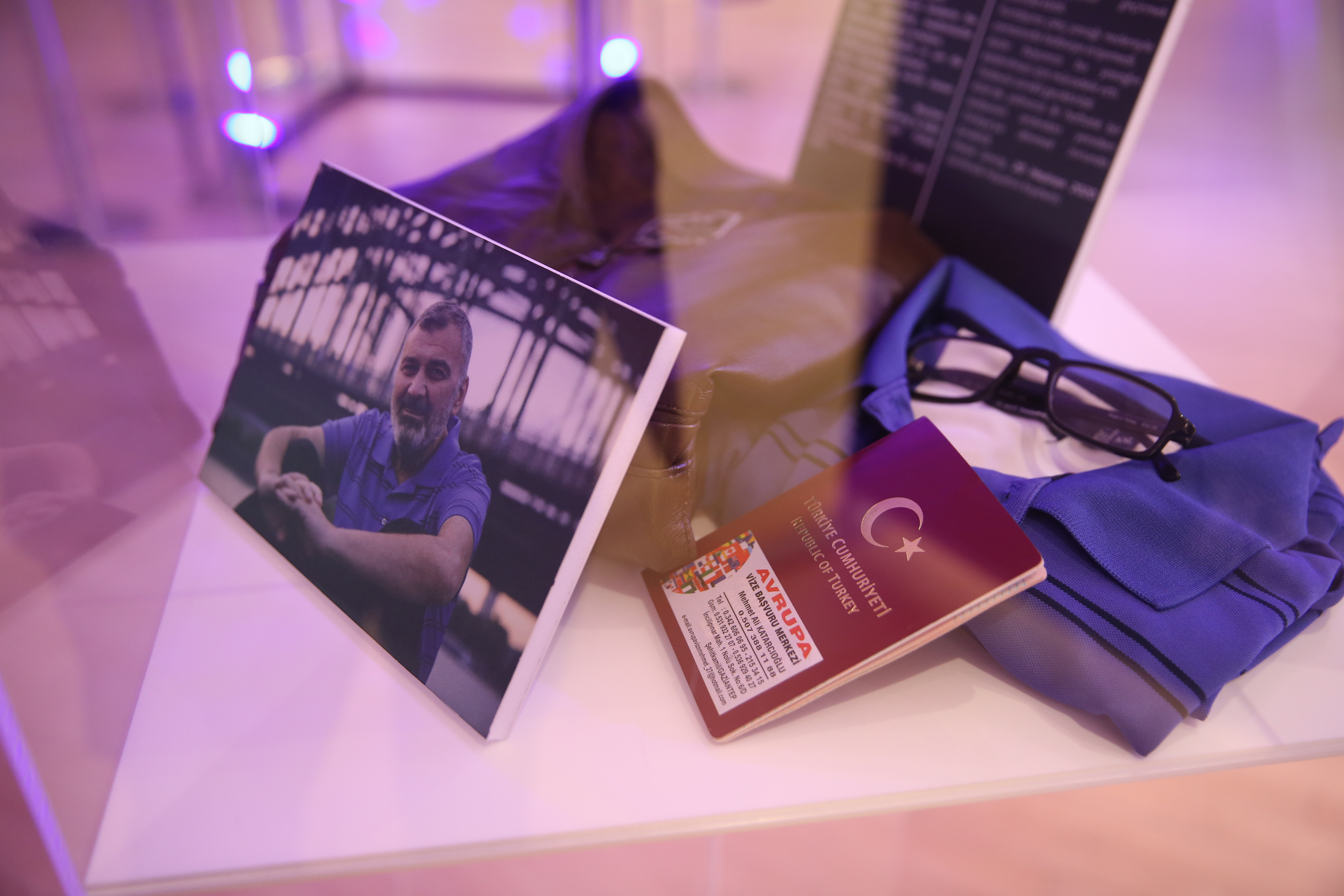
The belongings of Prof. Dr. Haluk Savaş, who passed away because he could not receive timely treatment due to a travel ban.

== Photo gallery of exhibition stops ==
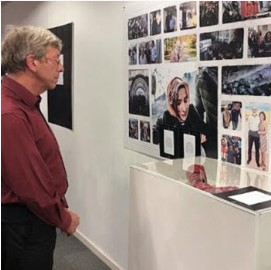
Tenkil Museum In the European Parliament Strasbourg

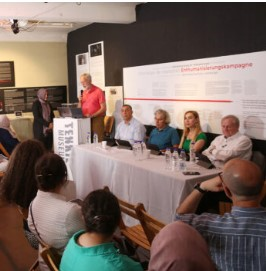
Tenkil Museum Tenkil-Disaster Frankfurt

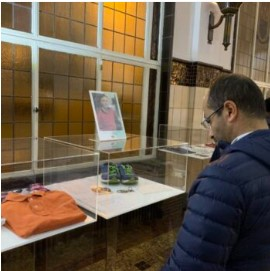
Tenkil Museum Tenkil-Exhibition in Limburg

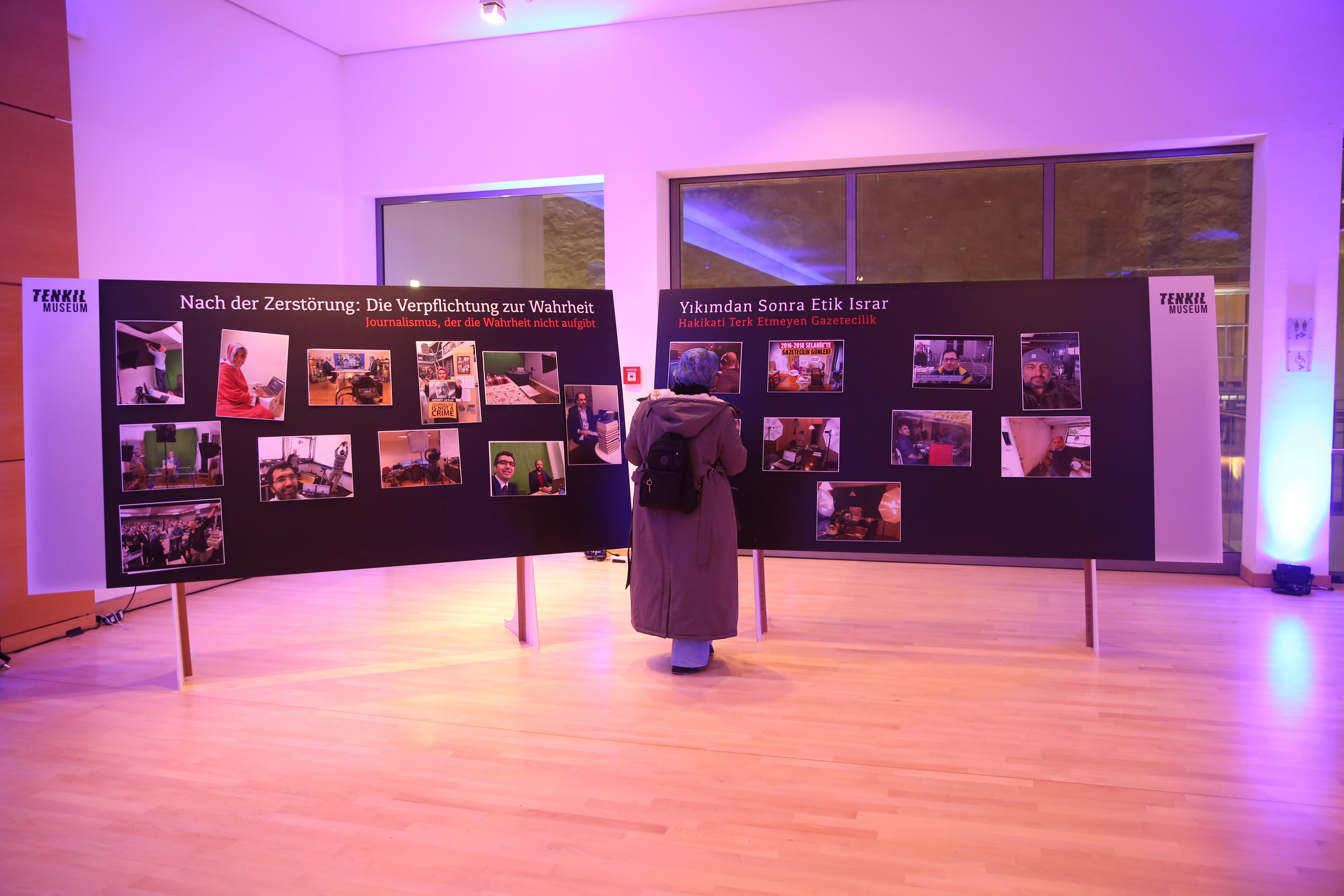
Feb. 7, 2026 - Museum of Repression exhibition, Hanau
