= Death of Elliott Williams =

2011 death of a man in an Oklahoma jail

Elliot E. Williams
- Born: 1974
- Died: October 27, 2011 (aged 36–37); David L. Moss Criminal Justice Center
- Cause of death: Complications of vertebrospinal injuries due to blunt force trauma combined with starvation and dehydration
- Burial place: Memorial Park Cemetery, Tulsa, OK
- Spouse: Elia Patricia Lara-Williams
- Parents: Earl Williams; Katha Williams
- Relatives: Kevin Williams

BURKE v. GLANZ
- Court: N.D. Okla.
- Docket nos.: D.C. No. 4:11-CV-00720-JED-PJC
- Defendants: Stanley Glanz, SHERIFF OF TULSA COUNTY, in His Individual and Official Capacities; Correctional Healthcare Management of Oklahoma; et al
- Plaintiffs: Robbie Emery Burke, as the Special Administratrix of the Estate of Elliot Earl Williams, Deceased

Case history
- Subsequent actions: appealed, upheld

Holding
- "Accordingly, Sheriff Glanz’s conduct was sufficiently reprehensible to justify the $250,000 punitive damages award."(10th Cir.)

Court membership
- Judge sitting: Judge John Dowdell

Keywords
- Wrongful Death, negligence, Indifference

Elliott Earl Williams (born 1974) was a US Army veteran who died in the Tulsa County, Oklahoma jail on October 27, 2011. The medical examiner determined in a 2014 report that he died from "complications of vertebrospinal injuries due to blunt force trauma", starvation, and dehydration. Special Administrator Robbie Emery Burke, representing the Estate of Mr. Williams, filed a lawsuit on April 16, 2012, against Sheriff Stanley Glanz, Correctional Healthcare Management of Oklahoma, Inc., et al. The Claims for Relief pertain to Cruel and Unusual Punishment in Violation of the Eighth Amendment and/or the Fourteenth Amendment of the United States Constitution; and Wrongful Death.

== Jailing ==
On October 21, 2011, Mr. Williams was arrested by Owasso police in the lobby of a Marriott hotel in Owasso, Oklahoma for misdemeanor obstruction of a police officer; he was subsequently transported to Tulsa County jail on October 22, 2011.

While Mr. Williams was in his cell, incapacitated, food and water were brought to him, but he was unable to reach them; jail officials taunted him and accused him of faking his injuries.

== Aftermath ==
In December 2011, Mr. Earl and Mrs. Katha Williams, the parents of the deceased, sued the city of Owasso for records related to the arrest of their son; the suit was predicated on a violation of Oklahoma's Open Records Act. Ms. Elia Lara-Williams, wife of the late Mr. Williams, filed suit against Sheriff Stanley Glanz and the medical staff of the Tulsa County jail.

== Oklahoma State Bureau of Investigation: Suspicious death report ==
The Oklahoma State Bureau of Investigation conducted an investigation into the death of Mr. Williams from 14 November 2011 through 31 December 2011.

The subsequent report summarized the pertinent events as follows:

On October 21, 2011, about 2100 hours, Owasso Police Officers arrested ELLIOTT EARL WILLIAMS on Obstruction Charges at the Marriott Hotel in

Owasso, Oklahoma.

On October 22, 2011, about 0100 hours, EARL WILLIAMS was transported to the Tulsa County Jail, David L. Moss. WILLIAMS was placed in a holding cell in the booking area. About 1330 hours, WILLIAMS, who stated he could not move his legs, was taken to the medical unit on a gurney.

On October 22, 2011, about 1415 hours, WILLIAMS was placed on suicide watch.

On October 27, 2011, about 1135 hours, WILLIAMS, who was lying on the cell floor, was pronounced dead.

— Chuck Jeffries, OSBI

This report was later filed with the court presiding over the Burke v. Glanz case on April 1, 2014.

== Civil lawsuit: Burke v. Glanz ==
In July 2016, U.S. District Judge John Dowdell ruled that a federal civil rights lawsuit against former Sheriff Stanley Glanz and Tulsa County officials could proceed. In February 2017, defense attorneys for Sheriff Vic Regalado and Mr. Glanz filed a motion accusing Judge Dowell of failing to disclose a conflict of interest, which Judge Dowell subsequently denied.

In March 2017, Judge Dowell ruled in favor of the plaintiffs, requiring Tulsa County and former Sheriff Stanley Glanz to pay $10.2 million and $250,000, respectively, to the Estate of Mr. Elliott Williams.

Following challenges by attorneys for Mr. Glanz and Tulsa County, the 10th U.S. Circuit Court of Appeals upheld most of Judge Dowell's ruling on August 20, 2019.

=== Expert reports ===
==== Psychiatrist Steven Hoge, MD ====
Dr. Hoge, retained by law firm Smolen Smolen & Roytman on behalf of Ms. Burkey, was also asked to review evidential records and to "render an opinion regarding the mental health care of Elliott Earl Williams at the time of his arrest and during his incarceration at the Owasso County Jail and the David L. Moss Criminal Justice Center ..." In his report, Dr. Hoge concludes the following:

In summary, it is my opinion that were it not for the numerous serious and

significant failures to evaluate and treat Mr. Williams' mental health problems, he would not have suffered the injuries that led to his death. The police, medical staff, and detention staff who came into contact with Mr. Williams disregarded known and substantial risks to his health and safety.

It is my opinion that there is an affirmative link between the deficient mental health and medical policies, practices and customs at DLMCIC and Mr. Williams' death.

— Steven K. Hoge, Expert Report submitted to record in case of Glanz v. Burke

==== Medical Examiner Scott A. Allen, MD ====
Dr. Allen, on behalf of Ms. Burke's attorneys, conducted a review of evidential records relating to the medical care of Mr. Williams while in custody of the David L. Moss Criminal Justice Center. Dr. Allen concluded, in part, that Mr. Williams died "not only from lack of medical care, but also from lack of food and water, all while under the care of licensed health professionals."

==== Corporal Billy McKelvey ====
Corporal McKelvey was tasked with determining whether any TSCO employee violated policies, willfully or otherwise, that contributed to the death of Mr. Williams; and, what actions were taken by Correctional Healthcare Companies, Inc employees.

== See also ==
- Death of Darren Rainey
- Death of Sandra Bland
- Death of Kristiana Coignard
