= Lee Kwan Woh v Public Prosecutor =

Lee Kwan Woh v. Public Prosecutor [2009] 5 CLJ 631 was a case heard in the Federal Court of Malaysia. The Federal Court unanimously allowed Lee's appeal against the death sentence because of irregularities in his original trial for drug trafficking in the High Court, and held that the trial judge's behaviour constituted a violation of Article 5 of the Constitution of Malaysia, which provides that no person shall be deprived of life or personal liberty save in accordance with the law. The decision further held that constitutional rights must be read prismatically and in a generous fashion, and not literally.

== Background ==
Lee Kwan Woh was a painter accused of trafficking 420g of cannabis. The High Court in Ipoh found him guilty in 2002 and sentenced Lee to death. The Court of Appeal upheld this decision. Unusually, the High Court had not permitted Lee to make submissions in his defence, instead concluding after the prosecution's submissions that a successful prima facie case had been made, and that Lee was guilty. The trial judge asserted that section 180(1) of the Criminal Procedure Code permitted this. Lee's subsequent appeal to the Federal Court was on the basis that this action violated Article 5(1) of the Federal Constitution, which states that no person shall be deprived of life or personal liberty except in accordance with the law, and that the trial judge had failed to appreciate the evidence in Lee's favour.

== Decision ==
In a unanimous decision, the Federal Court allowed Lee's appeal. The judgment was written by Federal Justice Gopal Sri Ram. The unanimous judgment held that constitutional rights must be read prismatically and generously, not literally:

On no account should a literal construction be placed on [the Constitution's] language, particularly upon those provisions that guarantee to individuals the protection of fundamental rights. In our view, it is the duty of a court to adopt a prismatic approach when interpreting the fundamental rights guaranteed under Part II of the Constitution. When light passes through a prism it reveals its constituent colours. In the same way, the prismatic interpretive approach will reveal to the court the rights submerged in the concepts employed by the several provisions under Part II. Indeed the prismatic interpretation of the Constitution gives life to abstract concepts such as "life" and "personal liberty" in Article 5(1).

The Federal Court found that the trial judge's action did constitute a violation of Article 5(1), even though the Constitution makes no express mention of a defendant's right to make submissions at trial, and even though the judge's actions were not technically prohibited by law. The Federal Court also found that the trial judge had been insufficiently critical of the prosecution's evidence, and not paid attention to inconsistencies or errors in them. In light of this, the conviction was unsafe, and the Federal Court ordered Lee set free.

== See also ==
- Loh Wai Kong v. Government of Malaysia
- Pihak Berkuasa Negeri Sabah v. Sugumar Balakrishnan & Another
- Tan Tek Seng v. Suruhanjaya Perkhidmatan Pendidikan & Another
