= Death of Kugan Ananthan =

2009 killing by Royal Malaysian Police officers

Kugan Ananthan (died 20 January 2009) was a Royal Malaysian Police detainee who died in a police lock-up while under arrest for suspicion of alleged car robbery. Kugan's family forcefully broke into the morgue where Kugan's body was kept (for which they were later scolded by then Home Minister and IGP of Malaysia) and stated they believe he had been tortured to death while in police custody. His case was later classified as murder by the Attorney-General, and 11 officers at the station where he died were transferred to desk duty. The Inspector-General of Police has promised a full investigation into Kugan's death.

An initial autopsy declared the cause of death to be acute pulmonary edema (fluid accumulation in the lungs), but Kugan's family alleged scratches and other bruises on the corpse were proof he had been tortured. A second autopsy was later held. This second autopsy found the cause of death to be rhabdomyolysis—skeletal muscle damage resulting in acute kidney failure. Health Ministry director-general Tan Sri Ismail Merican later released a report on the differences between the two autopsies. The report, based on the findings of a 10-person committee, suggested that although Kugan had been beaten, probably with a flexible blunt object such as a hose, the trauma was insufficient to cause death. The report also dismissed other discrepancies in the two autopsy reports, attributing them to miscommunication and misinterpretation on the part of the pathologist who performed the second autopsy.

The High Court found Inspector-General of Police (then the Selangor police chief) Khalid Abu Bakar, Khalid's predecessor as national police chief, Ismail Omar, and three other defendants liable for misfeasance leading to his death after finding contradictions between Khalid's and other witnesses' testimonies. The High Court awarded his mother RM851,700 in assault and battery, false imprisonment, misfeasance, and pain and suffering damages.

== See also ==
- Teoh Beng Hock
- Gunasegaran Rajasundram
- Aminulrasyid Amzah
- Police (Malaysia) Act 1967
