= Custodial death of Gunasegaran Rajasundram =

Gunasegaran Rajasundram (1977 – 16 July 2008) was a Royal Malaysian Police detainee who died in the police lock-up while under arrest for suspicion of drug possession. Coincidentally, his death was on the same day as Teoh Beng Hock's body was found. The case of R. Gunasegaran is crucial to the discussion on police practices because it highlights several issues with the policing of Malaysia: the safety of whistleblowers, human rights during police custody, the procedures of inquests, and the practices of the police force. Understanding this case could bring us to find out what more could be done to better the policing system of Malaysia.

Gunasegaran worked as a toddy shop assistant. He was arrested together with other four detainees (Ravi Subramaniam, Suresh M Subbaiah and Selvach Santhiran Krishnan and one unknown Malay male). He collapsed while his thumbprint was being taken between 6.45pm and 7pm on July 16, 2008 at the Sentul police headquarters and was pronounced dead at 7.40pm at the Kuala Lumpur Hospital the same day.

His family members were later informed that Gunasegaran' death was due to drug abuse-related causes. This was substantiated with the burial permit issued by the hospital authorities. However, the deceased's family believed in another version of truth, that the death was due to police brutality instead of the reported drug abuse. Upon learning of the death, the family have since been in contact with eyewitnesses to Gunasegaran's arrest and detention by the police and have been informed that at the time of his arrest, Gunasegaran was physically assaulted; and that, at the Sentul police station, Gunasegaran was subjected to further assaults causing Gunasegaran to lose consciousness which he never regained until his death.

== The Coroner's Verdict ==
On October 25, 2010, in the open verdict delivered by the coroner's court in the inquest to determine the cause of Gunasegaran s/o Rajasundram's, the coroner Siti Shakirah binti Mohtarudin found insufficient evidences to record a conclusion to the case. Open verdict, according to the Collins English Dictionary, means a finding by a coroner's jury of death without stating the cause. In other words, Gunasegaran's death was deemed suspicious by the jury but none of the other verdicts open to them could be reached.

According to the six-page judgment report done by the coroner, there were two versions of how Gunasegaran had died based on the testimonies of witnesses. The first version is that the deceased fainted when police were processing his thumbprints and then, he died on the way to the hospital due to drug-related issues as testified by both post-mortem reports. On the other end, following the testimonies of the three eyewitnesses, the second version was that the deceased had been kicked and beaten by a police officer who arrested him that caused his death. Both versions can be accepted in her opinion but a post-mortem report is an undisputed prima facie evidence.

== Response to Death ==
=== Gunesegaran's Family ===
On November 3, 2010, the family of R. Gunasegaran, most notably his sister Ganga Gowri Rajasundram, applied to the High Court to review the open verdict handed down at the inquest investigating his death. It had been more than one since Gunasegaran s/o Rajasundram's “sudden death” as classified by the police, but the family is still waiting for the truth of R. Gunasegaran's demise to see the light of day. A total of 23 witnesses have testified but yet, the truth was still unacceptable by the family of Gunasegaran. Ganga Gowri asked for a review of the coroner's decision that the injuries sustained by Gunasegaran could have come from attempts to resuscitate him. She also questioned the decision of the coroner that Gunasegaran had consumed drugs beyond lethal levels.

=== Non-governmental Organizations ===
This case has drawn the attention of many parties including the likes of The Malaysian Bar, World Organization against Torture (OMCT) and so on. In its statement on October 29, 2010, The Malaysian Bar questioned the effectiveness of the inquest when the coroner failed to reach a definitive finding in the case despite the strength of the evidences pointing towards the culpability of the police: testimonies of the three witnesses and the second autopsy report which found a 28 cm long, 8 cm width and 5 cm depth scar on R. Gunasegaran's chest.

World Organization against Torture (OMCT) also expressed its deep concern when one of the key witnesses in the case, K. Selvachandran was detained under the two-year detention order under the Dangerous Drugs (Special Preventive Measures) Act 1985 (DDA), which provides for detention without trial for up to two years. During the arrest, Mr. K. Selvachandran was allegedly beaten by the police in front of his wife and children before he was taken to the Kuala Lumpur police contingent headquarters. He would suffer from hearing problems due to the beatings.

The 11 Non-Governmental Organizations, which included The People's Parliament, SUARAM, Jemaah Islah Malaysia (JIM), Centre for Policy Initiatives (CPI) and Writers Alliance for Media Independence (WAMI), also released a joint statement on August 17, 2009 requesting a standard operating procedure (SOP) for investigations into cases of death in custody.

== Sequence of Events ==
=== K. Selvachandram's Detention ===
The reason why Gunasegaran's case draws much attention is that one of the key witnesses, K. Selvachandran, was detained after testifying and was alleged physically assaulted by policemen. This is widely criticized by human rights groups across the globe like OMCT. In the joint statement by Lawyers for Liberty and SUARAM, they expressed deep disappointment at the arrest of K. Selvach Santhiran who testified in the Gunasegaran case despite the threat from police. The 2 year detention order was under Dangerous Drug Act (Special Preventive Measures) 1985 at December 14, 2010. K. Selvach had then been detained in Batu Gajah detention camp. Dangerous Drug Act (Special Preventive Measures) 1985 allows the police to detain a person for 60 days with no recourse to judicial safeguard and thereafter 2 years’ detention on the order of the Home Minister.

Selvach was one of three persons who were in police custody with R. Gunasegaran and they have consistently identified a certain individual as having physically assaulted the deceased. They did so despite threats to their safety by the police and despite the inducement that their cooperation would secure their immediate release. On the very day the verdict was delivered in the inquest, the police moved against Selvach and came to his home to arrest him. When Selvach's children asked the police why their father was being dragged away, the police answered by beating Selvach in front of his own children. In a twisted perversion of conjugal love, the police tried to make Selvach's wife S. Saraswathy kiss him before beating him up in front of her. S. Saraswathy alleged that one of the policemen grabbed the house key when Selvachandran was trying to unlock the door, punched him and opened the door themselves.

To make the matter worse, Selvach's family was not able to meet him although they were informed that they could visit him at IPK Kuala Lumpur at the morning before he was sent to Batu Gajah. Till the transfer to Batu Gajah, Selvach was without legal counsel. Besides, the detention of Selvach is gravely aggravated by the fact that he was arrested on the same day after the “open verdict” was delivered. Coincidence could not explain the suspicious proximity between the time of arrest and the announcement of the verdict. Furthermore, if Selvach's family statement was valid, the necessity of beating the man in front of his family after the arrest is questionable since K. Selvach was no longer a physical threat.

Concerned with the safety of K. Selvach under custody, a group of 70 people including representatives from several NGOs have had gathered under the watchful eyes of the police. The group demanded Selvach's immediate release as well as a public apology. After handing in their memorandum, they then peacefully dispersed.

== See also ==
- Kugan Ananthan
- Teoh Beng Hock
- Police brutality
- Police (Malaysia) Act
- Royal Malaysia Police
