= Teoh Beng Hock =

Malaysian journalist and activist (1979–2009)

- 赵明福
- Born: 20 April 1979; Selangor, Malaysia
- Died: 16 July 2009 (aged 30); Kompleks SPRM Selangor, Shah Alam, Selangor, Malaysia
- Burial place: Nirvana Memorial Park, Semenyih, Selangor, Malaysia
- Education: Universiti Kebangsaan Malaysia
- Occupations: Journalist, political aide
- Employer: Ean Yong Hian Wah
- Known for: Victim of a unresolved death case
- Spouse: Soh Cher Wei
- Children: 1

Teoh Beng Hock
- Traditional Chinese: 趙明福
- Simplified Chinese: 赵明福
Transcriptions
Standard Mandarin
- Hanyu Pinyin: Zhào Míngfú
Southern Min
- Hokkien POJ: Tiō Bêng-hok

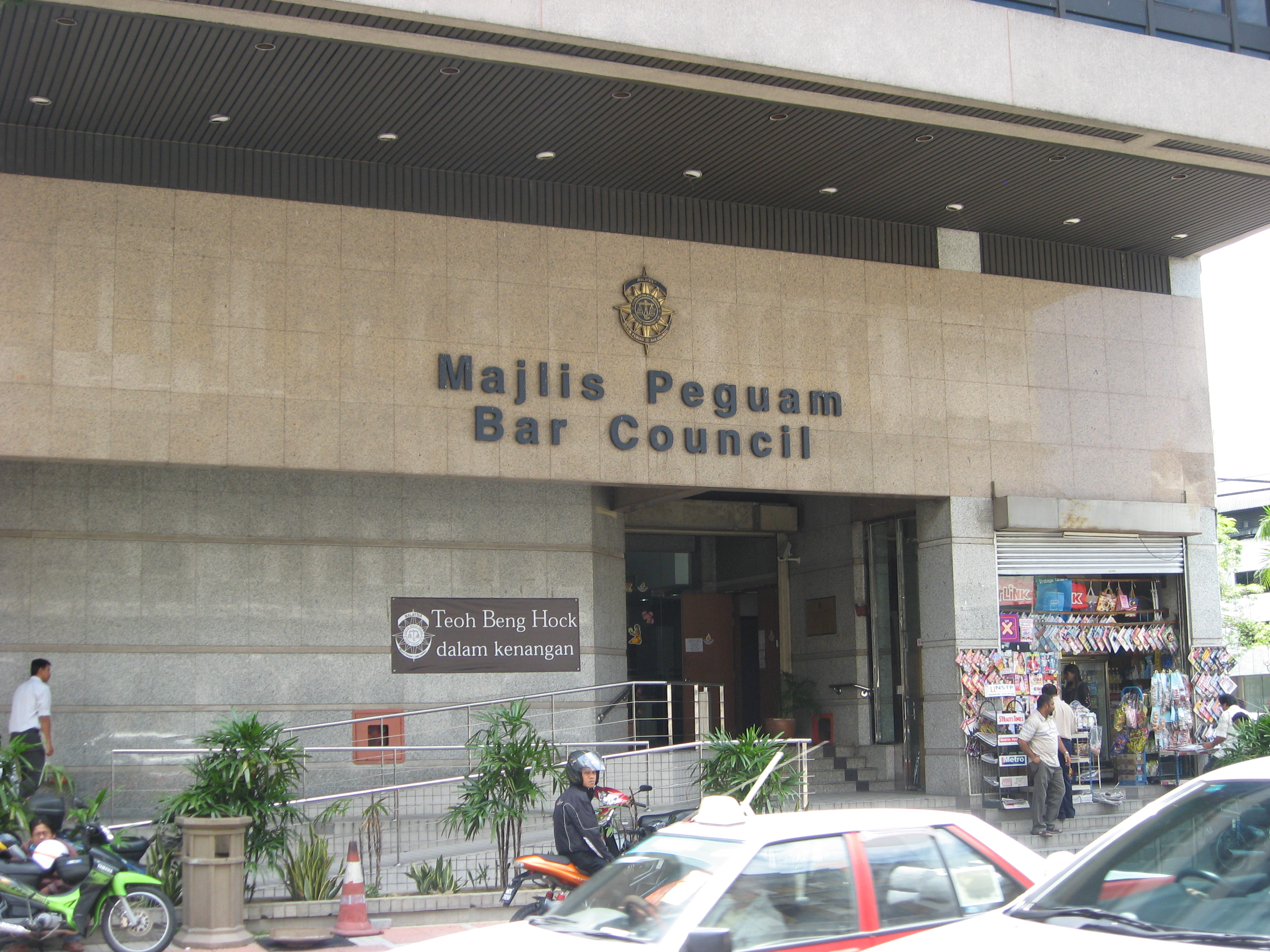
Bar Council of Malaysia (headquarters in Kuala Lumpur) showing a banner (Teoh Beng Hock in memoriam).

Teoh Beng Hock (20 April 1979 – 16 July 2009) was a Chinese Malaysian journalist and political aide to Ean Yong Hian Wah, a member of the Selangor state legislative assembly and state executive council. On 15 July 2009, the Malaysian Anti-Corruption Commission (MACC) took Teoh was initially scheduled to meet investigators regarding allegations of corruption, but before the session could take place, he was reported missing. The next morning, he was found dead on the rooftop of a building adjacent to the MACC offices, sparking confusion and speculation. The unusual circumstances prompted both Pakatan Rakyat leaders and several federal government officials to urge the establishment of a Royal Commission of inquiry to uncover the truth behind the incident.

== Family ==
Teoh was the third child of Teoh Leong Hwee (born 1953). He had an elder brother; Teoh Beng Kee (Chinese: 赵铭基) (born 1976), elder sister; Teoh Lee Jun (Chinese: 赵丽君) and a younger sister; Teoh Lee Lan (1980,Chinese: 赵丽兰). His father was a taxi driver, and his mother, Teng Shuw Hor (1953) is a housewife.

Teoh was engaged to 28-year-old teacher Soh Cher Wei after a two-year courtship, and had been planning to register his marriage with her the day following his death. A photo shoot on the same day, followed by a honeymoon and wedding reception in October had also been planned. At the time of Teoh's death, Soh was two months pregnant; she told the press she intended to keep the child. National Registration Department regulations only allow a father's name to be included on the birth certificate if he is physically present at the time of birth; after this was publicised through the press, Women, Family and Community Development Minister Shahrizat Abdul Jalil said she would ask the NRD to look into the matter. Shahrizat also stated her ministry would assist in transferring Soh from her current school to one closer to her hometown, and look into assisting Teoh's family since he was their sole breadwinner.

Prime Minister Najib Razak later met with Teoh's family to express his condolences. Najib told them he would direct the Attorney-General and relevant government departments to look into Teoh's family's wish that his child bear the Teoh surname. On 15 August 2009, Soh completed the traditional Chinese marriage ceremonies, together with Teoh Lee Lan, Beng Hock's younger sister, acting as a proxy. Kerk Kim Hock, a distant uncle of Teoh and the family's acting spokesperson, told the press that completion of the marriage rites now entitled Soh to have her name engraved on Teoh's gravestone as his wife.

== Sequence of events ==
MACC officials claimed that Teoh's questioning had lasted for about 9 hours. According to the MACC also, Teoh was freed at 3.45 am—however without proper explanation, his possessions, including his mobile phone, remained in MACC custody. MACC officials also claimed that Teoh asked to stay the night at the MACC office, and was claimed to be last seen alive around 6 am. Teoh was found dead at 1.30 pm later in the day. The investigation had been into allegations that Ean Yong had paid RM2,400 for flags to be used in Merdeka Day celebrations, but not taken delivery of the flags. Teoh's colleagues who had also been questioned claimed that they were put under pressure from MACC officers, including being denied access to legal counsel and food or drink. Teoh's mobile phone was still in the possession of MACC officials when he was found dead at 1.30 pm despite the MACC's claims that Teoh was released at 3.45 am. The mobile phone was later handed to the police for investigation.

One of Teoh's colleagues, Tan Boon Wah, later filed suit against the MACC for false imprisonment. In the case, Tan Boon Wah v. Datuk Seri Ahmad Said Hamdan, Ketua Suruhanjaya, Suruhanjaya Pencegahan Rasuah Malaysia and Others, the High Court ruled that because Tan was interrogated after normal working hours, he had been subject to false imprisonment, and ordered the MACC to pay him damages. Tan's lawyer, Karpal Singh, said that Teoh's family could also sue the MACC for damages, citing this ruling. Democratic Action Party Parliamentary leader and former Opposition Leader Lim Kit Siang lamented that "Teoh Beng Hock would not have died if MACC had followed the law" and interrogated him during the day.

Teoh's family and others have called the MACC's version of events into question. When the investigating officer involved briefed the MACC's advisory board, several members of the board "asked why he chose to stay back. Any detainee would have run for his life! The investigating officer replied that since Teoh wanted to stay back, he allowed it." During this briefing it also emerged that no official records of Teoh's detention or his release existed. In August, a video of men in uniform assaulting a man in their custody began circulating as a supposed video of Teoh's interrogation. The Bukit Aman federal police headquarters denied the men were police personnel. The video had previously been circulated in June as a supposed example of police interrogation techniques, ruling out the possibility of it involving Teoh. A political observer attributed the video's popularity to the government's failing to provide adequate clarification about the circumstances of Teoh's interrogation: "The authorities are shedding little light about what happened to Teoh. This allows rumour mongers to spread ridiculous things."

== Response to death ==
Some lawyers have argued that the law does not authorise the MACC to hold witnesses in custody, and that since Teoh was not a suspect, he should not have been held in custody. The Malaysian Human Rights Commission (SUHAKAM) called the duration of Teoh's questioning "inhumane and cruel." The president of the Bar Council, K. Ragunath, said the MACC had contravened the Federal Constitution by denying Teoh legal counsel during questioning, as well as the Lockup Rules 1953, which require all detainees to be locked up between 6.30 pm and 6.30 am to rest. Ragunath called Teoh's interrogation tantamount to torture. Ean Yong's lawyer insisted that as "Teoh's movement was restricted, this amounts to an arrest," despite the MACC's insistence that Teoh was only a voluntary witness. Mohamad Ramli Manan, a senior official who retired from the Anti-Corruption Agency (before it became the MACC), agreed:

It is against established law and practice to interrogate them (suspects) in the night. The lock-up rules demand that they be sent to a lock-up by at least 8 pm... Witnesses are sent back to their offices or homes and asked to be present at another appointed date. I don't know why they had to call Teoh at 5 pm. This may be due to poor planning or some evil intention or evil purpose on their part. ... The rights of a witness are protected more than that of a suspect, who is under detention...the person can demand that the interview be adjourned to the next morning. ... The examining officer has to oblige, failing which this becomes an (unlawful) detention or arrest. ... This shows that Teoh was definitely in the custody of the MACC. Under Section 15 of the Criminal Procedure Code, an arrest occurs when you confine the person (physically). Thus, there was unlawful detention or arrest of Teoh.

Another former ACA official, Abdul Razak Idris, disputed Ramli's view of the interrogation process, saying: "The Act provides that we can interview anytime. Investigators are supposed to work 24 hours."

In response to calls from civil society and political leaders for a Royal Commission, Deputy Prime Minister Muhyiddin Yassin stated the Cabinet would consider setting up a Royal Commission of inquiry. Initial police findings suggested foul play was not involved in Teoh's death, but his friends and relatives insisted Teoh had not committed suicide, pointing to the fact that he was to be married, and that his fiance was pregnant. Teoh's family lawyers claimed that during questioning by the police, his family had been asked questions suggesting that they were primarily interested in "[absolving] MACC officers from liability" by pursuing the possibility of a suicide. A week after Teoh's death, his family vigorously insisted there was no possibility he had killed himself: "Teoh was joyful and had no problems at work. Teoh had no financial issues, got along well with everyone and was preparing for his wedding." One detail which seemed to strike the police was Teoh's shoes; when his body was discovered, his shoes were apparently significantly damaged and worn. Teoh's fiancee "said that Teoh had several pairs and seldom changed them unless they were damaged, but on that fateful day, he wore a new pair."

The United Malays National Organisation (UMNO)-owned newspaper Berita Harian published an op-ed by New Straits Times Press managing editor Zainul Ariffin Isa criticising the response to Teoh's death, stating that criticisms of the MACC were an attempt to undermine Malay institutions. Zainul was particularly critical of Selangor Menteri Besar Khalid Ibrahim for his criticism of the MACC officers' handling of the case, saying it was not right for Khalid to question "those of the same race as him."

At the weekly Malaysian Cabinet meeting on 22 July following Teoh's death, the Cabinet transferred all MACC officers involved in the probe of graft allegations against the Selangor government to other assignments, pending the official police inquiry. The Cabinet also decided to establish a Royal Commission of inquiry into the MACC's interrogation procedures, but not Teoh's death, allowing the standard inquest to pursue the matter.

=== Royal Commission of inquiry ===
In a joint statement, Pakatan Rakyat leaders called the Royal Commission's terms of reference insufficient, saying that the "question [of how Teoh died] cannot be separated from the more general issue of how the MACC conducts investigations." The Pakatan Rakyat statement insisted that the Commission probe the following questions:

*why was Teoh's case allegedly involving an amount less than RM2,500 is [sic] pursued with such aggression and urgency?

- why was Teoh and another so-called "witness" kept overnight and interrogated with such oppression?
- why was Teoh's hand phone in the custody of the MACC when the MACC insisted that he was only a witness; why did the MACC initially deny they took his handphone?
- why would Teoh spend the night at the MACC's office if he was free to go especially since he was scheduled to be married the next morning?
- why would Teoh commit suicide (as alleged by MACC and others) in these circumstances, when he is about to get married, with his fiancé expecting their child, and with no sign or history of depression or mental illness?

Robert Phang, a member of the MACC advisory board, suggested that "Though the royal commission's scope is wide, it can be opened up further to dig deeper into issues not cleared by the inquest," such as establishing a reason for Teoh's death. On 19 August 2009, the inquest was adjourned after Gobind Singh Deo, the lawyer for Teoh's family, gave the coroner an unsigned letter typed on an MACC letterhead, and the coroner ordered the police to investigate it. According to Malaysiakini, the letter alleged that Hishamuddin Hashim, the deputy director of the Selangor MACC, had been questioning Teoh on the day he was found dead, that his method of interrogating suspects was to hold them by the belt and shake them, and that he had ordered staff to wipe the window from which Teoh was thought to have fallen; it did not say how Teoh died or whether Hishamuddin was directly involved in his death. Teoh's belt had been found broken near the buckle, with unidentified male DNA on the torn part. The letter also alleged that Hishamuddin had worked with Khir Toyo, a former Menteri Besar of Selangor, to start the investigations into alleged corruption by the state's Pakatan Rakyat leaders; Khir denied the letter's claims. On 24 August, the lawyer appearing for the Attorney-General told the inquest that the police had found no evidence to support the allegations about the interrogation method and the window, or an allegation that Hishamuddin had ordered his subordinates to keep his name out of the case. He said one of the letter's claims was correct: Hishamuddin had not clocked out when he left the office on 16 July, which according to the letter could show that he was the last person to have seen Teoh. The lawyer added that CCTV showed Hishamuddin leaving at 6.26 am, and that the letter's remaining allegations were outside the inquest's scope. He also said that fresh DNA samples from twelve MACC officers, including Hishamuddin, did not match the DNA on the belt. Hishamuddin testified in October that he had never met Teoh at the MACC office.

The coroner declined to mark the letter as an exhibit at that stage. The royal commission, which reported in 2011, admitted it as an exhibit and found no evidence that the MACC had formally investigated it. The commission rejected the Bar Council's suggestion that the belt had broken because Teoh was held dangling by it from the window, saying that such damage is common in falls from a height and that the unidentified DNA on the belt matched none of the MACC officers involved. It accepted the evidence of two MACC officers that Hishamuddin had directed the operation and, at a meeting on the evening of 16 July 2009 after Teoh's body was found, had tried to shift responsibility for it onto the investigating officer. It found no direct evidence that Hishamuddin had a hand in Teoh's death, but it rejected his account of his role, held him responsible for the actions that drove Teoh to suicide, and named him as one of three officers who had most probably put Teoh through a final round of interrogation. In April 2012, the government told Parliament that the Attorney-General's Chambers had found no criminal offence by the three officers, and that they faced only a disciplinary charge of failing to supervise a witness.

The Royal Commission of Inquiry concluded that Teoh was not murdered but had committed suicide due to the aggressive interrogation tactics by three MACC officers. Teoh's family have rejected the RCI's findings and insisted that Teoh was murdered. The Bar Council of Malaysia have also questioned the RCI's findings. A coalition of 126 NGOs have called the Commission's findings a whitewash as it did not address the concerns regarding the interrogation methods by the MACC. Prime Minister Najib Tun Razak has defended the RCI's findings and called on all quarters not to question the findings. The Malay daily Utusan Malaysia, which is owned by UMNO, defended the MACC and blamed DAP for Teoh's death.

The three MACC officers involved in interrogating Teoh have been suspended pending an investigation by the police.

=== Further developments ===
On 10 February 2012, Teoh Meng Kee, Beng Hock’s elder brother filed an application at the Court of Appeal to review the open verdict stating that Teoh Beng Hock committed suicide delivered by the Coroner’s Court in 2011, after his application was rejected by the High Court on 1 December 2011. The Court of Appeal on 5 September 2014 set aside the open verdict stating that "a person or persons were responsible" for Teoh's death.

=== Legacy ===
In July 2014, five years after his death, the Teoh Beng Hock Trust for Democracy was formed to pursue justice in his case.

In 2026, Malaysian folk-rock group Faye Faire released Run The Distance, a song and music video dedicated to Teoh and questioned the still unresolved circumstances that surrounded his death.

== See also ==
- Kugan Ananthan
- Tan Boon Wah v Seri Ahmad Said Hamdan
- Gunasegaran Rajasundram
- Ahmad Sarbani Mohamed
- Royal Commission Watch
