= Gopal Sri Ram =

Former Malaysian judge, lawyer, and prosecutor (1943–2023)

Yang Berbahagia Datuk Seri Gopal Sri Ram PJN SMW DMSM DIMP

Judge of the Federal Court of Malaysia
- In office 2009–2010

Personal details
- Born: Gopal Sri Ram; 16 August 1943
- Died: 29 January 2023 (aged 79) Kuala Lumpur, Malaysia
- Spouse: Chandra Sri Ram
- Children: 2
- Parent: Gopal Ayer Ramaswamy (father)
- Education: Victoria Institution, Lincoln's Inn
- Profession: Barrister, Judge, Jurist

Gopal Sri Ram (16 August 1943 – 29 January 2023) was a Malaysian judge of the Federal Court, a senior lawyer, and a distinguished constitutional jurist. He was the first practising lawyer in Malaysia to be appointed directly to the Court of Appeal when the court was first established in 1994. He was in active practice almost purely as an advocate until his elevation on 17 September 1994.

Sri Ram had a distinguished career at the Bar and appeared in several leading cases covering a wide area of law. Many of these cases are reported in the Malayan Law Journal, some of which have introduced new principles into the Malaysian common law. He wrote about 800 judgments while sitting in the Court of Appeal and Federal Court between 1994 and 2010.

He represented Malaysian Prime Minister, Anwar Ibrahim in his final appeal for allegedly sodomising former aide Saiful Bukhari Azlan. Sri Ram was the lead prosecutor for the RM1.25 billion solar hybrid project corruption case involving Najib Razak’s wife, Datin Seri Rosmah Mansor. He was also leading the prosecution in Najib Razak's 25 charges of abuse of power and money laundering over alleged 1MDB funds amounting to RM2.28 billion deposited into his AmBank accounts.

== Early life and education ==
Sri Ram was the son of Gopal Ayer Ramaswamy, an assistant commissioner for labour in the state of Selangor, and Mangalam Seetharama Ayer. His father was awarded the MBE and OBE for his work. His brother, Datuk Gopal Ayer Sreenevasan, was a pioneering Malaysian surgeon and instrumental in the development of the medical services in Malaysia.

Sri Ram received his early education at Batu Road School and the Victoria Institution. He was called to the English bar by Lincoln's Inn in 1969 and was called to the Malaysian bar in 1970.

== Career ==
For short time after leaving school he taught English and Mathematics. Later, in July 1966 he left for England to read law.

In 1994, Gopal Sri Ram was elevated directly to the Court of Appeal from the private bar during Mahathir Mohamad's administration. He is the first practitioner in Malaysia to be elevated directly to an appellate court. In 2009, he was promoted to the Federal Court and subsequently retired in 2010. Sri Ram is well known for his brilliant explosive and unconventional judgments.

In 2005, Sri Ram was also appointed as a bencher by the Lincoln's Inn.

Sri Ram returned to practice law after his retirement from the bench in 2010, was appointed in 2018 by then attorney-general, Tommy Thomas to lead the prosecution in the 1MDB-related cases and Rosmah’s graft case.

== Personal life and death ==
Sri Ram was married to Chandra Sri Ram, and had two sons, one of whom is a practising lawyer.

His father, Datuk Gopal Ayer who was an Assistant Commissioner for Labour, was the only non-British to have been conferred a Member of the British Empire by King George VI.

On 29 January 2023, Sri Ram died in hospital, in Kuala Lumpur, after being warded for a lung infection a week before. He was 79.

In 2023, Sri Ram's family donated more than 10,000 books and law journals worth about RM 9 million to the University of Malaya law faculty library. The collection is named as 'The Personal Collection of the late Justice Datuk Seri Gopal Sri Ram donated by Datin Seri Chandra Sri Ram to the University of Malaya in memory of the world renowned Librarian and Information Scientist, Dr S. R. Ranganathan .'

== Bibliography ==
- Sri Ram, Gopal (2008). Information Support for the Legal Profession. Ess Ess Publications. ISBN 978-8-170-00536-0.

== Honours ==
- Malaysia
  - Commander of the Order of Meritorious Service (PJN) – Datuk (2009)
- Malacca
  - Companion Class I of the Exalted Order of Malacca (DMSM) – Datuk (1996)
- Pahang
  - Knight Commander of the Order of the Crown of Pahang (DIMP) – Dato' (1996)
- Federal Territory (Malaysia)
  - Grand Commander of the Order of the Territorial Crown (SMW) – Datuk Seri (2010)
