= Landmarks in Cameron Highlands =

This is a list of landmark buildings in the Cameron Highlands, a hillside station in Malaysia. During the colonial era, the Cameron Highlands was a haven for those who were homesick. At present, it is a stopover for those who want to escape from the heat of the lowlands. Over the years, there have been many improvements at the province. Here are some landmarks that have withstood the test of time.

== Agricultural Experiment Station (MARDI) ==
Established in 1925, the Agricultural Experiment Station was set up to determine the types crops that could grown at the tableland.

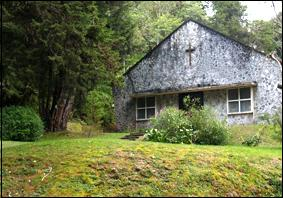
All Souls' Church

For a start, studies were carried out on Cinchona (C. pubescens and C. calisaya), tea (Dangri, Dhonjan, Rajghur, Charali Assam, Amulguri and Dutea), coffee (Mysore variety), orange, lemon, pomelo, tree tomato, guava, strawberry and three species of grass (Australian blue couch, carpet and Guinea grass). It was confirmed the uplands could support the growing of tea. This gave the British the impetus to develop the place.

In 1971, the station became a part of the Malaysian Agricultural Research and Development Institute (MARDI). Today, it still conducts research on a wide variety of crops that are grown at the district.

== All Souls' Church ==
Located in Taman Sedia, Tanah Rata, the plateau's little Church of England was once acknowledged by the early members of its congregation as The Cameron Highlands Church.

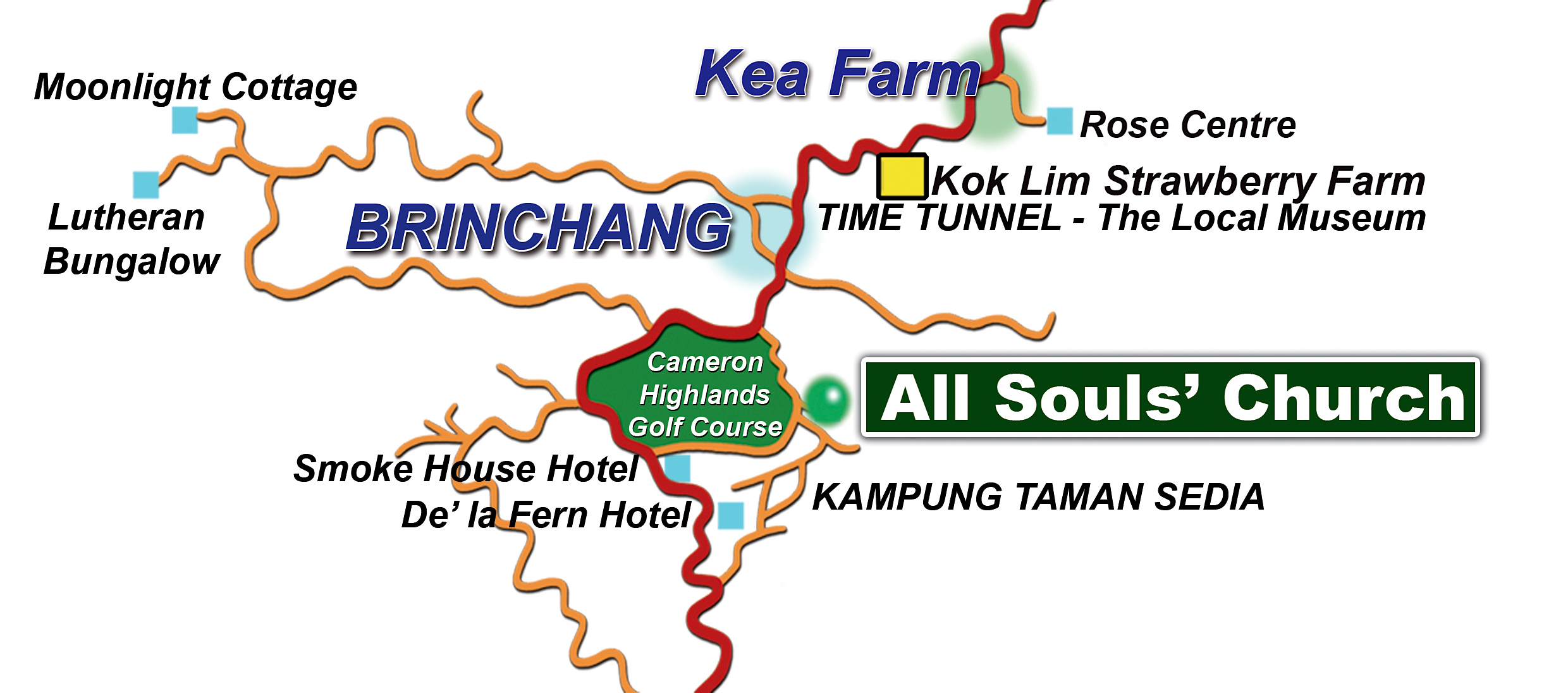
Location map of All Souls’ Church.

The history of this establishment can be traced back to the 1950s when its services were held at either the Cameron Highlands Hotel (now the Cameron Highlands Resort) or the former Slim School.

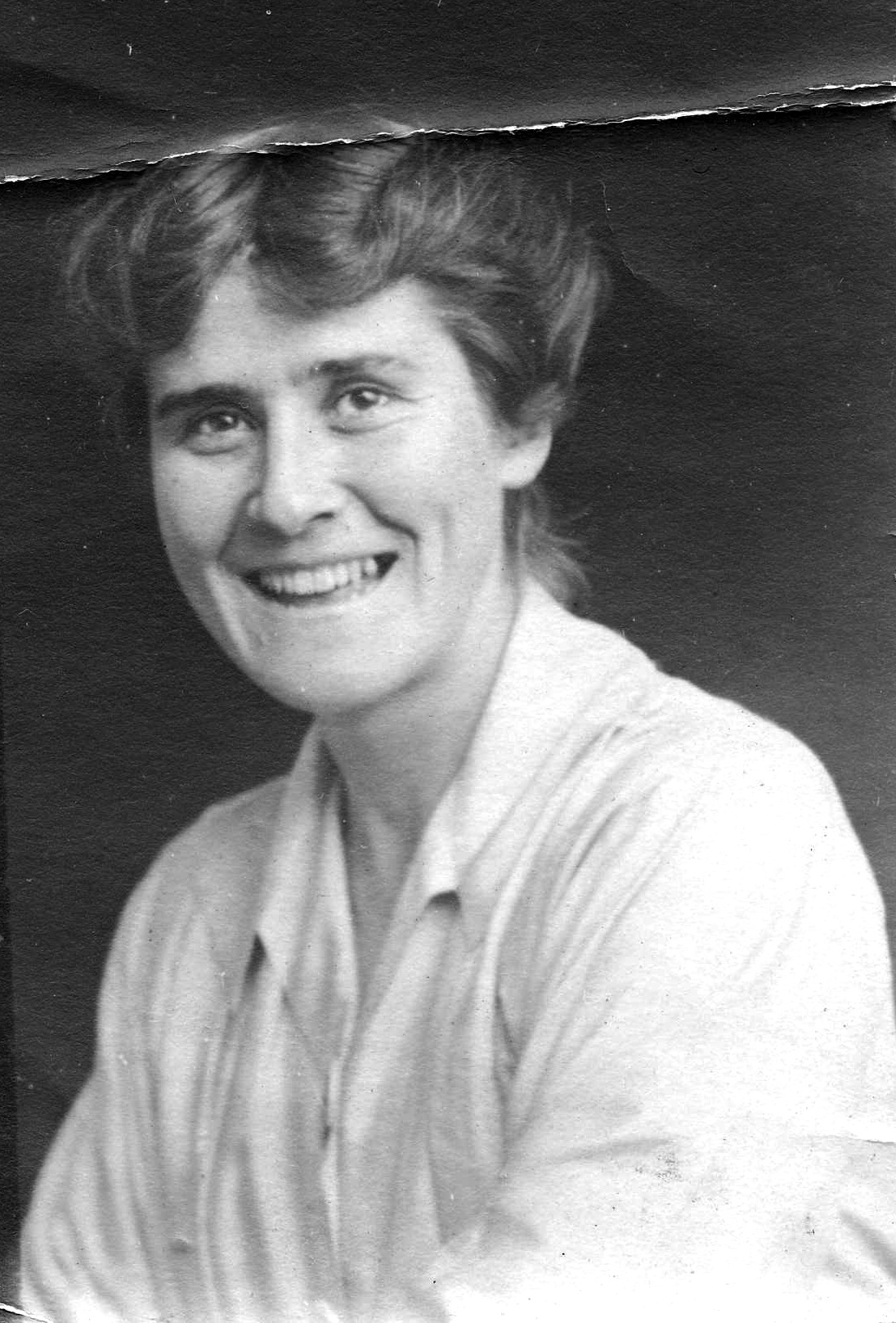
Miss Anne Griffith-Jones, OBE (1890–1973). Photo credit: Tanglin Trust School, Singapore.

In 1958, the church was offered a piece of land that used to adjoin the previous school. The plot, which was owned by Miss Anne Griffith-Jones (1890–1973), was transferred to the diocese on the understanding that a church would be built on it. To get things going, the British Army donated a sum of RM$1,000 to the church. Further to this, they also gave it a dismantled Nissen hut. It has since served as its roof structure to this day.

The construction of the church commenced in 1958. It was completed that same year. It was given the name “All Souls’ Church” during its consecration on Thursday, 30 April 1959. The Right Rev. Bishop H. W. Baines, the Bishop of Singapore and Malaya, conducted the services.

== Bala’s Holiday Chalet (former Tanglin Boarding School) ==
The inn is one of the oldest buildings at the resort. Built in 1935, it was previously occupied by the Tanglin Boarding School. Founded by Miss Anne Griffith-Jones, the school began with less than 20 pupils. Its curriculum was based on the British education system.

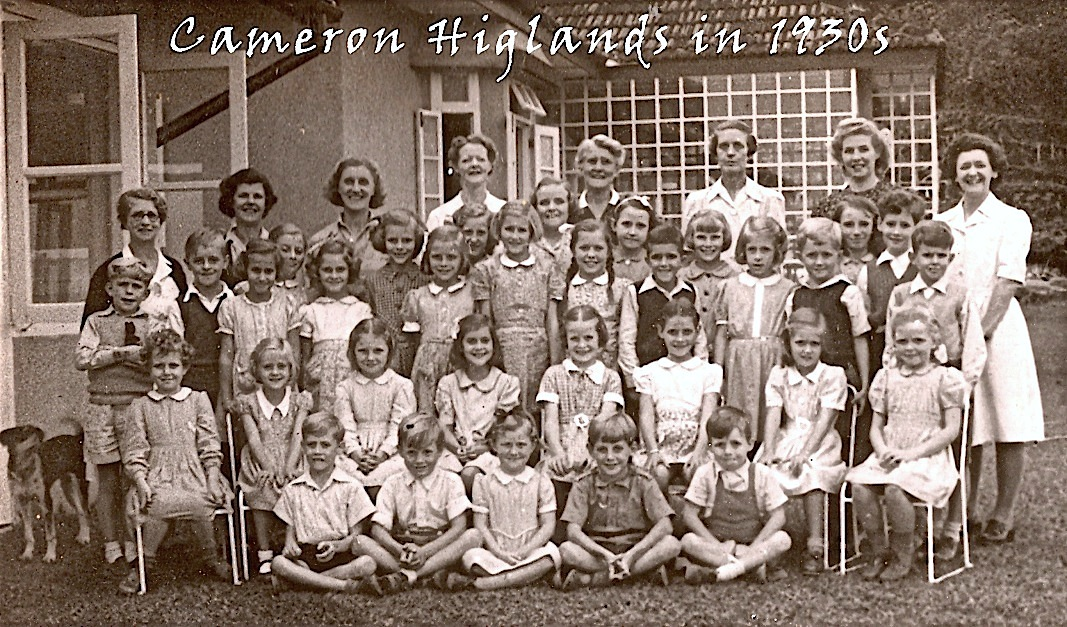
Tanglin Boarding School: Miss Anne Griffith-Jones (back row, fifth from left) with her staff and pupils outside the school's main building (c. 1930s). Photo credit: Tanglin Trust School, Singapore.

The school continued to grow until the outbreak of the Second World War. It ceased to function during the Japanese Occupation of Malaya. After the war, it reopened.

During the Malayan Emergency (1948–1960), the school became a target for the Malayan National Liberation Army. It was eventually forced to close by the Federal Government for security reasons. In 1950, the property was sold to the British War Office.

== Cameron Highlands Golf Club ==
It began with a six-hole golf course in 1935. In the early days, the club was patronised by the wealthy. Back then, it was common to find tiger paw prints in the bunkers.

Today, the club has changed a lot from what it once used to be. Apart from its improved facilities, it has also undergone a change in name. It presently operates as the Kelab Golf Sultan Ahmad Shah (SAS) Cameron Highlands.

== Chefoo School (Methodist Centennial Chefoo Centre) ==
The first Chefoo School was opened in China in 1881. It moved to the Cameron Highlands in 1952. Initially, the boarding school functioned from the Overseas Missionary Fellowship bungalow. In 1960, it relocated to a six-acre site at Jalan Sultan Abu Bakar. It remained here for four decades.

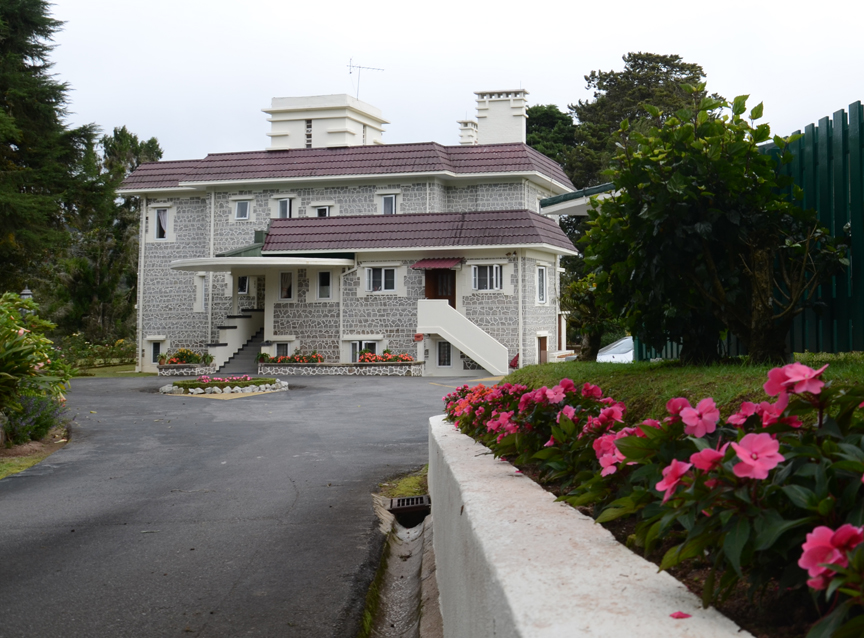
Cluny lodge (Singapore House).

In June 2001, the school had to close due to a drop in its student intake. The following year, the estate was sold to the Methodist Church in Malaysia. It is now known as the Methodist Centennial Chefoo Centre.

== Cluny Lodge (Singapore House) ==
The three-storied flat was built before the commencement of the Second World War. Located in Tanah Rata, it sits atop a knoll overlooking the town of Brinchang.

The building was bought over by the Singapore Government in the early 1960s. Since then, it has been used by the employees of the Singapore Civil Service as their lodging house.

== Foster’s Lakehouse (The Lakehouse) ==
The inn was once the home of the late Colonel Stanley J. Foster. Constructed in 1966, it took Colonel Foster almost four years to complete it. Situated at the 30th Mile of Ringlet, the Lakehouse is perched on a hill overlooking the Sultan Abu Bakar Lake. Set in an area dubbed "The Valley of Eternal Spring", this establishment has a lush forest as its backdrop.

== HSBC Bank Malaysia Berhad ==
Previously identified as The Hongkong and Shanghai Banking Corporation, HSBC Bank was the first financial institution to function at the Cameron Highlands.

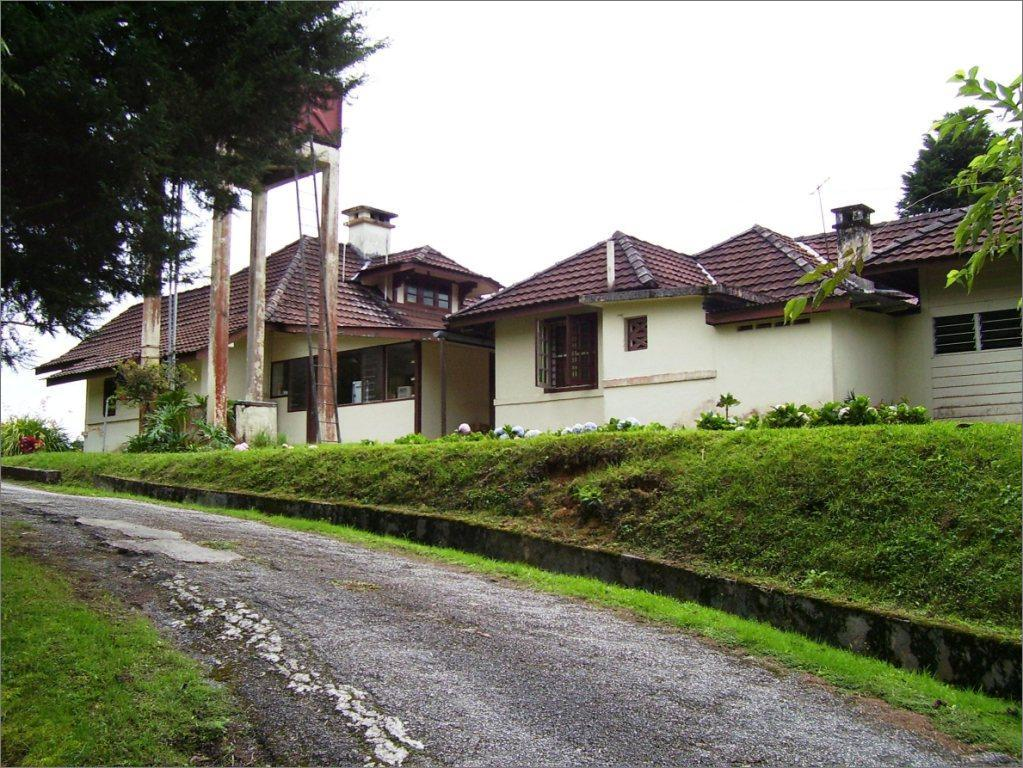
Lutheran Mission bungalow: The home is located at A45 Kamunting Road (Malay: Jalan Kamunting). Prior to his disappearance from the Cameron Highlands, Jim Thompson was seen at this cottage at about 4pm. After taking a look at the garden, he left the place.

In 1945, its banking services were carried out at the Cameron Highlands Hotel (now the Cameron Highlands Resort). Later, it moved to the British Military Hospital (now S.K. Convent). In 1947, it relocated to the Main Road at Tanah Rata. It has remained here to this day.

== Kamunting Road (Jalan Kamunting) ==
There are five houses located along the main corridor of Kamunting Road (Malay: Jalan Kamunting). They are “Moonlight” bungalow (A47), “Sunlight” mansion (A46), “Unit A43”, the “Lee Villa” (A44) and the Lutheran Mission Home (A45).

The precinct was in the news when Jim Thompson disappeared from the Cameron Highlands on Sunday, 26 March 1967. More than 500 people came here to look for him. They included the police, the army, Orang Asli trekkers, Gurkhas, tourists, residents, mediums, scouts, missionaries, American school students and British servicemen convalescing at the retreat. After searching the area for days, Thompson was not to be found.

== Lutheran Mission bungalow ==
The manor was constructed before the outbreak of the Second World War. It was then known as “Jee Lim Villa”.

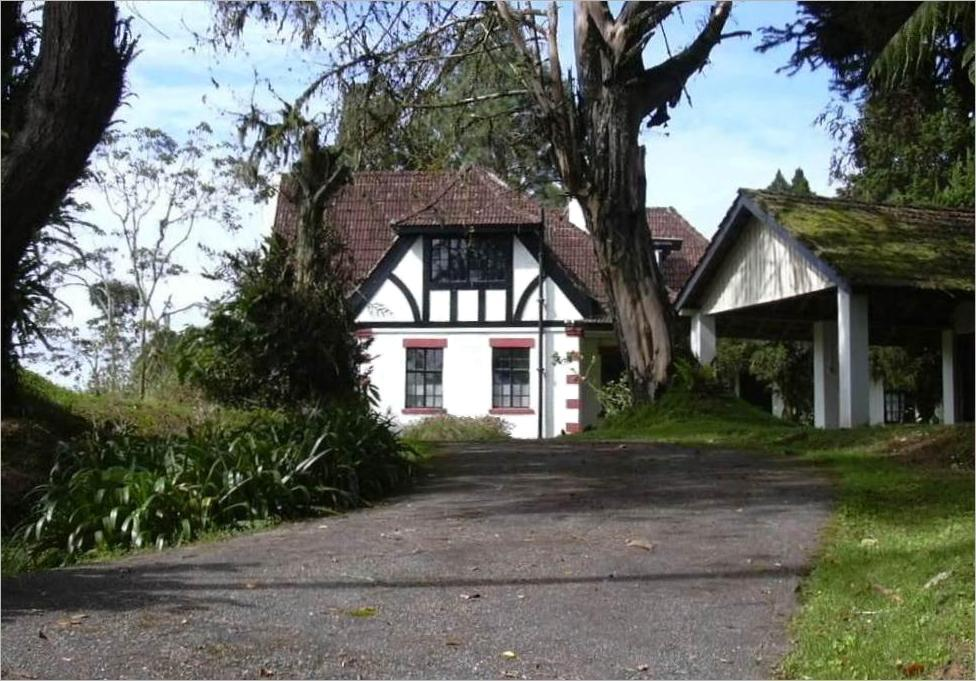
"Moonlight" bungalow: The mock Tudor-styled dwelling is located at A47 Kamunting Road (Malay: Jalan Kamunting). It was once the holiday home of Jim Thompson, the “Thai Silk King”. On his last visit to the Highlands, he left the bungalow at 1:30 pm. He failed to return before 6 pm.

Tucked at the far end of Kamunting Road (Malay: Jalan Kamunting), the place gained prominence when Jim Thompson vanished from the Cameron Highlands on Sunday, 26 March 1967.

The police were told he did stop by at the premises at around 4pm. While he was at the chalet, he did not speak to anyone. After taking a look at the garden, he left the site. Later, he was declared as lost.

== Moonlight bungalow (Jim Thompson cottage) ==
Located at A47 Kamunting Road (Malay: Jalan Kamunting), the mock Tudor-styled home is still a draw for the many who have had an interest in the life and disappearance of Jim Thompson.

The pre-War unit was constructed in 1933 by Societe Francaise des Mines d’Etain de Takka, a French mining company based in Gopeng, Perak. During the Malayan Emergency (1948–1960), its name was changed from the "French Tekka" bungalow to “Moonlight”. After the Emergency, the land was sold to the Lings. Later, it became the property of an Ipoh lawyer.

The Disappearance of Jim Thompson

Jim Thompson came to the Cameron Highlands with Mrs. Constance (Connie) Mangskau on Friday, 24 March 1967. They stayed at "Moonlight" bungalow with Dr. Ling Tien-Gi, a Singaporean-Chinese chemist and Mrs. Helen Ling, his Caucasian American-born wife.

On Easter Sunday, 26 March they attended the morning services at All Souls' Church. After church, they returned to their bungalow.

At 1:30 pm, Thompson went for a walk but failed to return before 6 pm.

— SOLVED! (2nd ed.), pages 21 – 23

Over the years, the ownership of the bungalow has changed hands many times. Before the present owners moved in, "Moonlight" belonged to a Chinese businessman followed by a resident from Kuala Lumpur. It was later taken over by a Caucasian who then sold it to a hotelier. Today, the house is worth more than a million US dollars. It is now called the Jim Thompson cottage.

== Overseas Missionary Fellowship (OMF) bungalow ==
The lodge was built in 1933 to provide accommodation for Christians who were involved with the preaching of the gospel. From 1952 to 1960, it served as the campus for the former Chefoo School. Thereafter, it became a venue for Christians to gather for their church activities.

== Pensionnat Notre Dame (S.K. Convent) ==
The Convent Primary School was once a boarding school for the children of the resort's expatriate community. Its history dates back to the time when the hill plain was first developed.

In the late 1920s, the Bishop of Malacca, H.E. Monsignor Emile Barillon wrote to the British government seeking a grant of land at the constituency. His purpose was to oversee a Catholic post comprising a monastery, a convent (Pensionnat Notre Dame), a retreat (Father's House) and a church. His request was granted on condition a European boarding school was included in the plan.

The construction of the Pensionnat Notre Dame began in 1929. Mr. P.L.M. Nathan, was appointed the project's architect and structural engineer. The structure was completed in 1934. H.E. Monseigneur Adrian Pierre Devals blessed the building's foundation on Monday, 9 July 1934. The first Mass was celebrated on Sunday, 26 May 1935. The Hon. Mr. C. C. Brown, the British Resident of Pahang officially opened the complex on Saturday, 27 July 1935. Thereafter, the school continued to grow. In less than three months, the student intake grew from 18 to 70. By 1940, it had more than 240 pupils. This, however, came to a halt during the Second World War (1941–1945). The Japanese turned the place into a hospital.

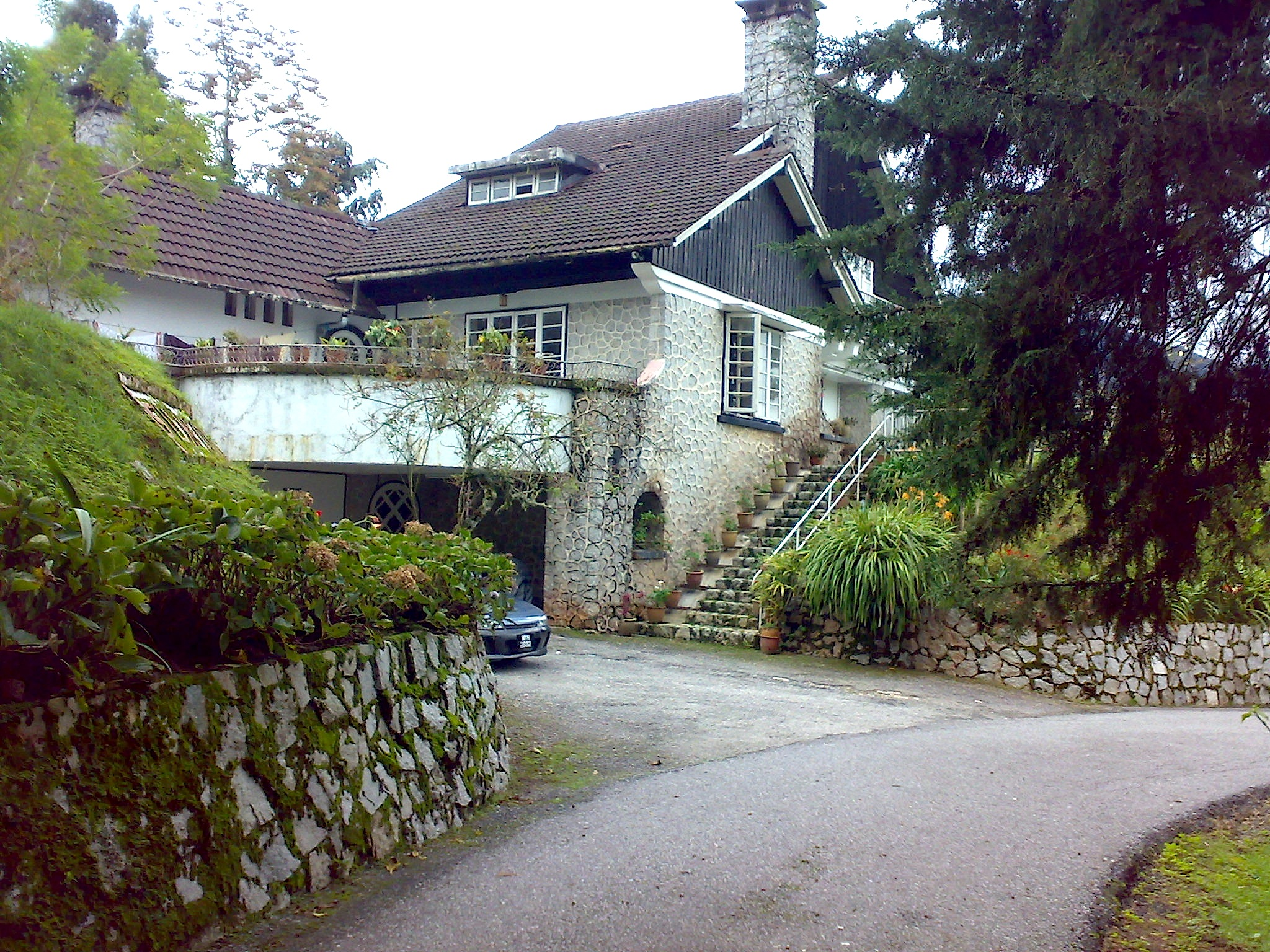
Sunlight bungalow: The unit is located at A46 Kamunting Road (Malay: Jalan Kamunting). It is about 50 meters from "Moonlight" bungalow.

After the war, the school reopened but it functioned from huts within its compound. The British continued to use the site as a hospital. Known as the British Military Hospital, it was leased from the church to serve as a convalescent depot for the members of the British Army.

When the British withdrew in 1971, the Gothic-styled building was returned to the Catholic community. It was renamed Sekolah Rendah Kebangsaan (S.K. Convent).

== Sunlight bungalow ==
The double-storied mansion was once used by a British company to house its staff. The pre-War abode is located about 50 metres (160 ft) from “Moonlight” bungalow. It is approximately three kilometres from Brinchang or about four kilometres from Tanah Rata.

In 1967, the villa made news when Jim Thompson mysteriously disappeared from the Cameron Highlands. The home was visited by scores of searchers. For days, the wasteland near the unit was carefully checked. At the end of the hunt, Thompson was not to be found.

== Tanah Rata Post Office ==
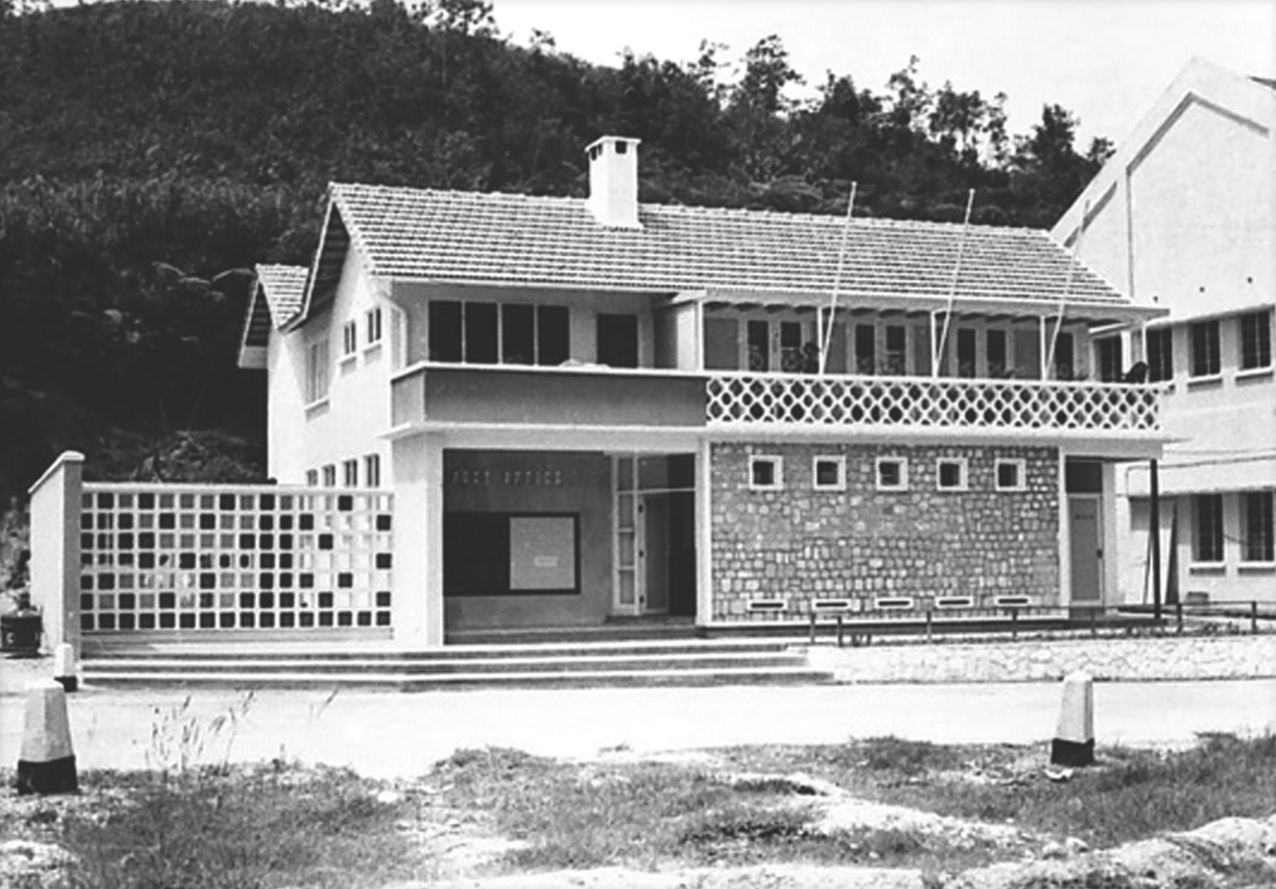
Tanah Rata Post Office (c. 1950s). Photo credit: Time Tunnel museum.

The post office was officially opened by Tunku Abdul Rahman, the then Chief Minister of Malaya on Friday, 25 June 1956. Located on the Main Road (Malay: Jalan Besar), it is one of the few post offices in the area that provides its customers with a “Poste restante” service.

== Ye Olde Smokehouse Inn (The Smokehouse Hotel) ==
Built by William J. Warin in 1939, the mock Tudor-styled hotel is renowned for celebrating everything British.

The inn is modelled on its namesake, the Smokehouse in Beck Row, Mildenhall, England, the United Kingdom. The interior is reminiscent of a typical English country house with open fireplaces and wood-panelled walls. Outside, the landscape would pass for an authentic English garden.

The landmark overlooks the Sultan Ahmad Shah golf course on the Tanah Rata-Bringchang road junction. It is still a popular place for visitors to gather for their afternoon tea and scones.
