= Time Tunnel (museum) =

2007 Malaysian pre-war museum

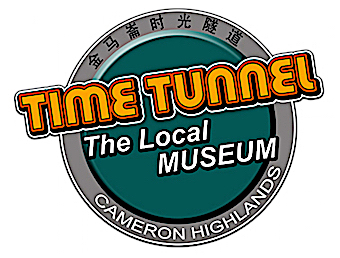
- Malaysia's first memorabilia museum.
- Established: January 2007
- Location: Hotel Titiwangsa Lot 187 & 188 Jalan Besar, Brinchang, Cameron Highlands, Malaysia. 4°29′41″N 101°23′32″E
- Type: Collectibles and Memorabilia museum.
- Collection size: 4,000+ objects showcased in eight galleries. Exhibition area:1,300 square metres.
- Curator: See Kok Shan
- Public transit access: Bus: Tanah Rata bus station. Taxi: Tanah Rata bus/taxi station or Brinchang town taxi stand.
- Parking: On site.
- Website: www.timetunnel.cameronhighlands.com

The Time Tunnel is a memorabilia museum in Brinchang, Cameron Highlands, Malaysia.

Established in January 2007, the museum contains more than 4,000 collectables and memorabilia. They are showcased in eight galleries covering approximately 1,300 square metres.

== Collection highlights ==
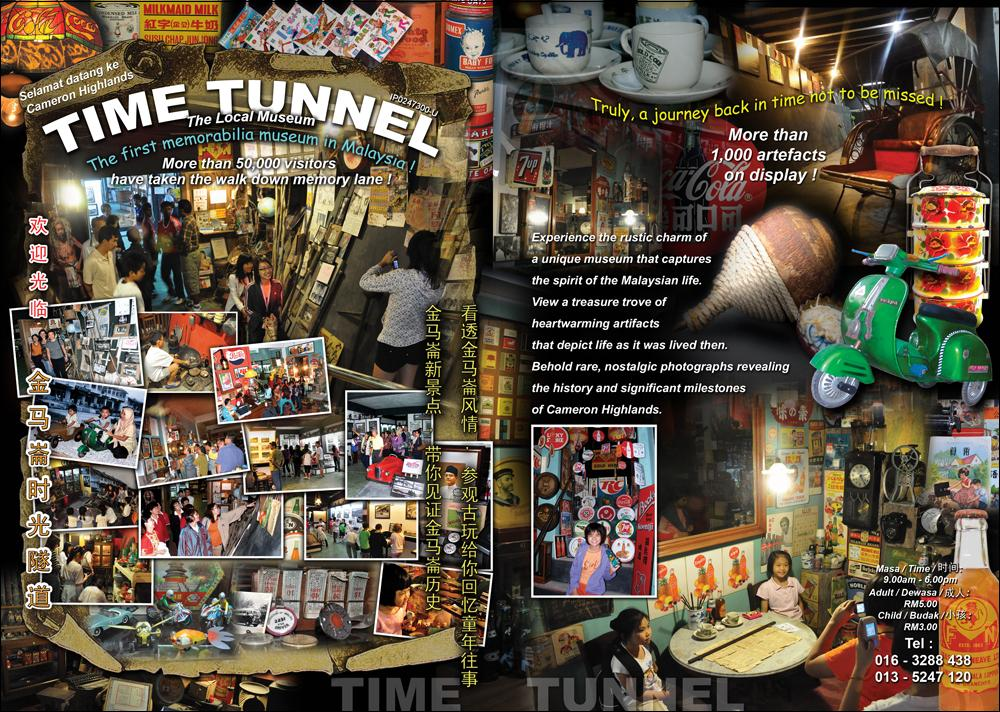
Flyer for the Museum

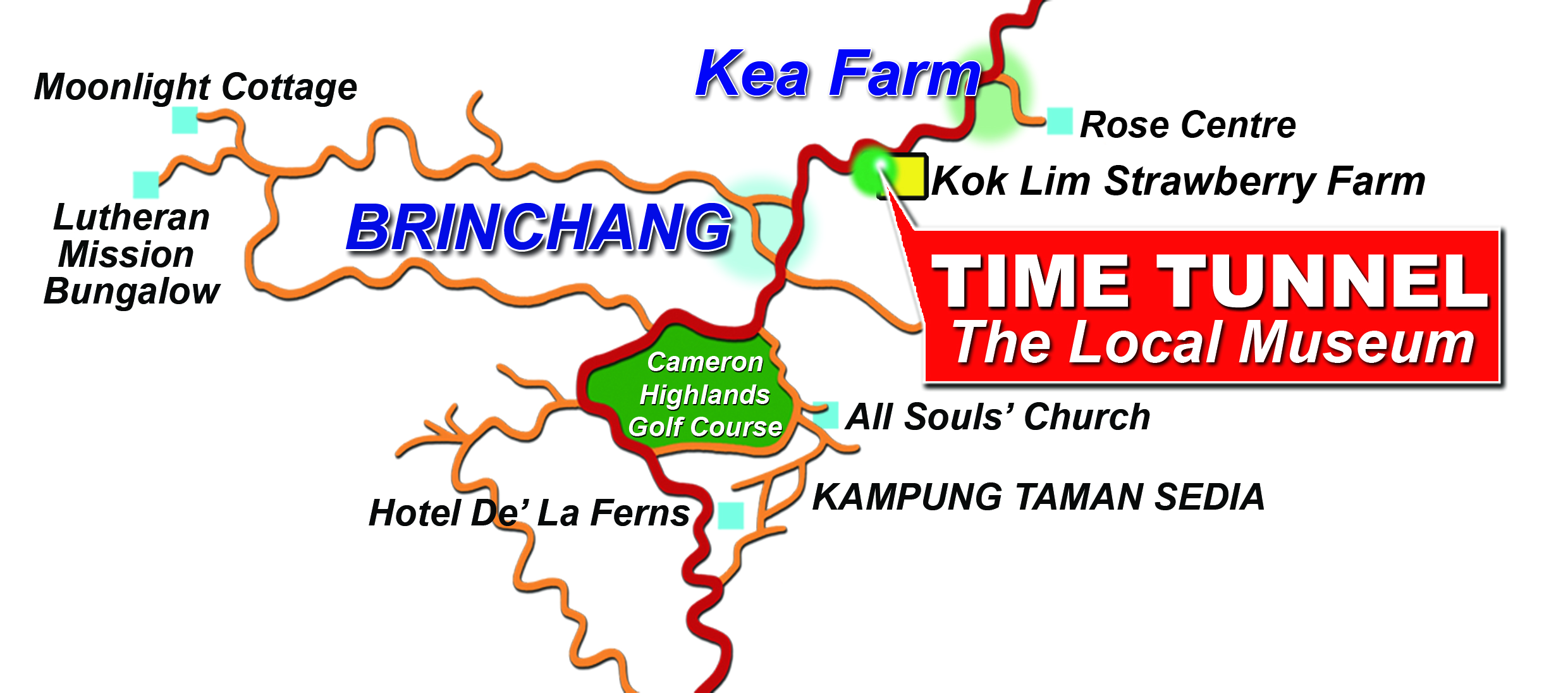
Location of the Time Tunnel museum

The museum displays traps, tools, and other handicrafts associated with the Orang Asli people. Other exhibits include a recreation of a barber shop including a barber chair over 50 years old, a children's section, and a coffee shop resembling a kopitiam. The Time Tunnel also contains over 4,000 objects described as collectibles or memorabilia. The traditional Malaysian kitchen exhibit contains stoves, tiffin carriers, and meat grinders.

A section of the museum is dedicated to Jim Thompson, who disappeared from the Cameron Highlands on Sunday 26 March 1967.

=== Photographs ===
The museum holds over 1,000 photographs, including images of:

- P. Ramlee’s identification card;
- S.K. Convent (when it served as the British Military Hospital in the 1950s);
- Jim Thompson, the Thai silk king;

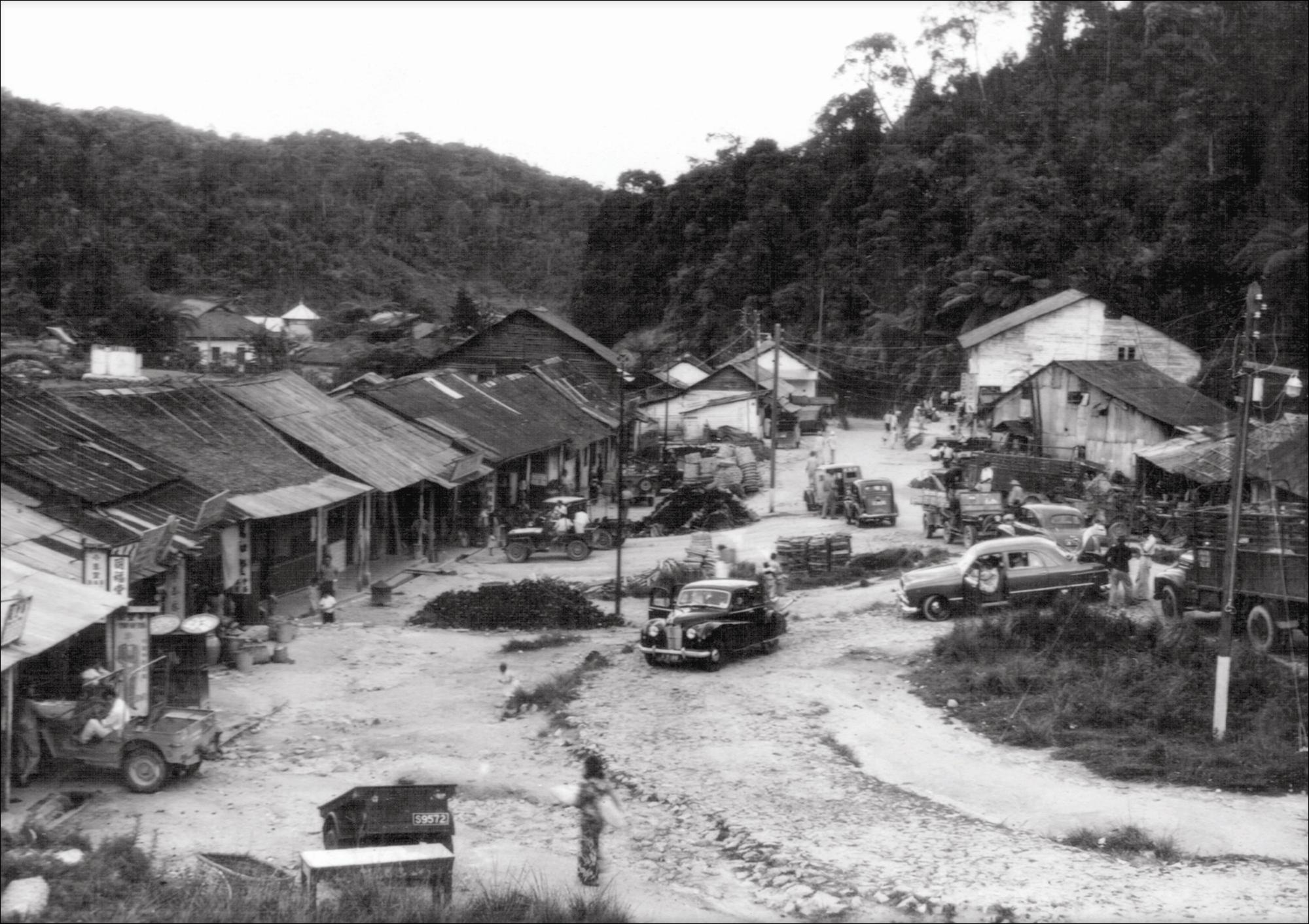
Brinchang, Cameron Highlands (c. 1950s)

- All Soul’s Church (undated);
- Ye Olde Smokehouse Inn (1950s);
- "Moonlight" bungalow (undated);
- "Sunlight" bungalow (undated);
- the bridge over the Sultan Abu Bakar dam (1960s);
- the Government Rest House at Tanah Rata (1950s);
- the 2nd hole of the Cameron Highlands Golf Course (1930s);
- Brinchang (1950s);
- Tanah Rata (1940s);
- Cluny Lodge (1960s);
- Father's House (1950s);
- Lutheran Mission bungalow (undated);
- Tanah Rata post office (1950s);
- the Cameron Highlands Home Guard (1950s); and
- the then Hongkong & Shanghai Banking Corporation (HSBC) when it moved to Tanah Rata in 1947.

== Gallery ==
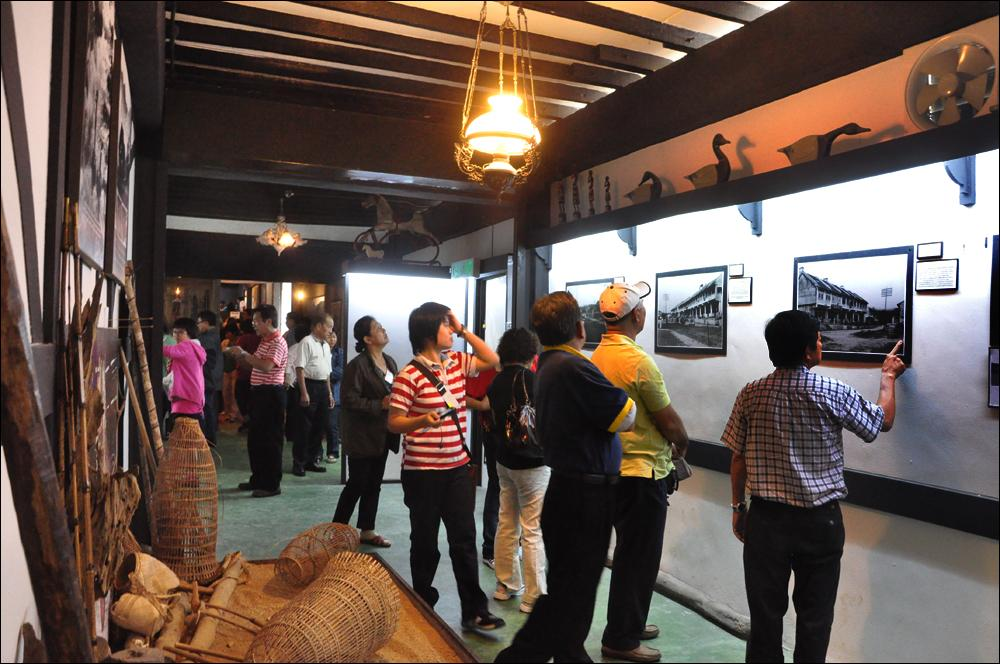
The Photo Section

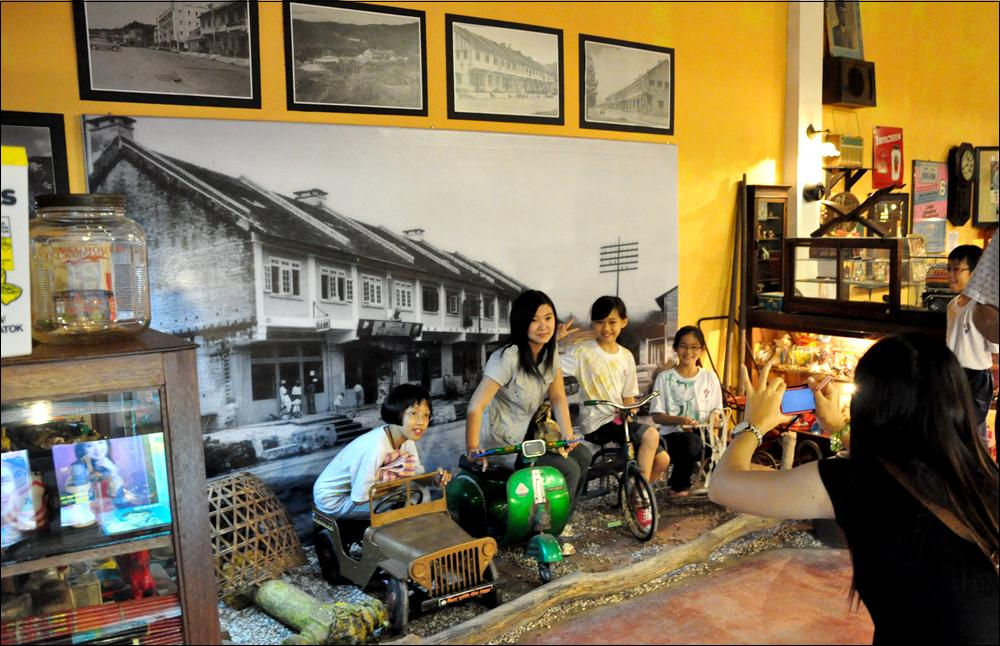
The Children's Section

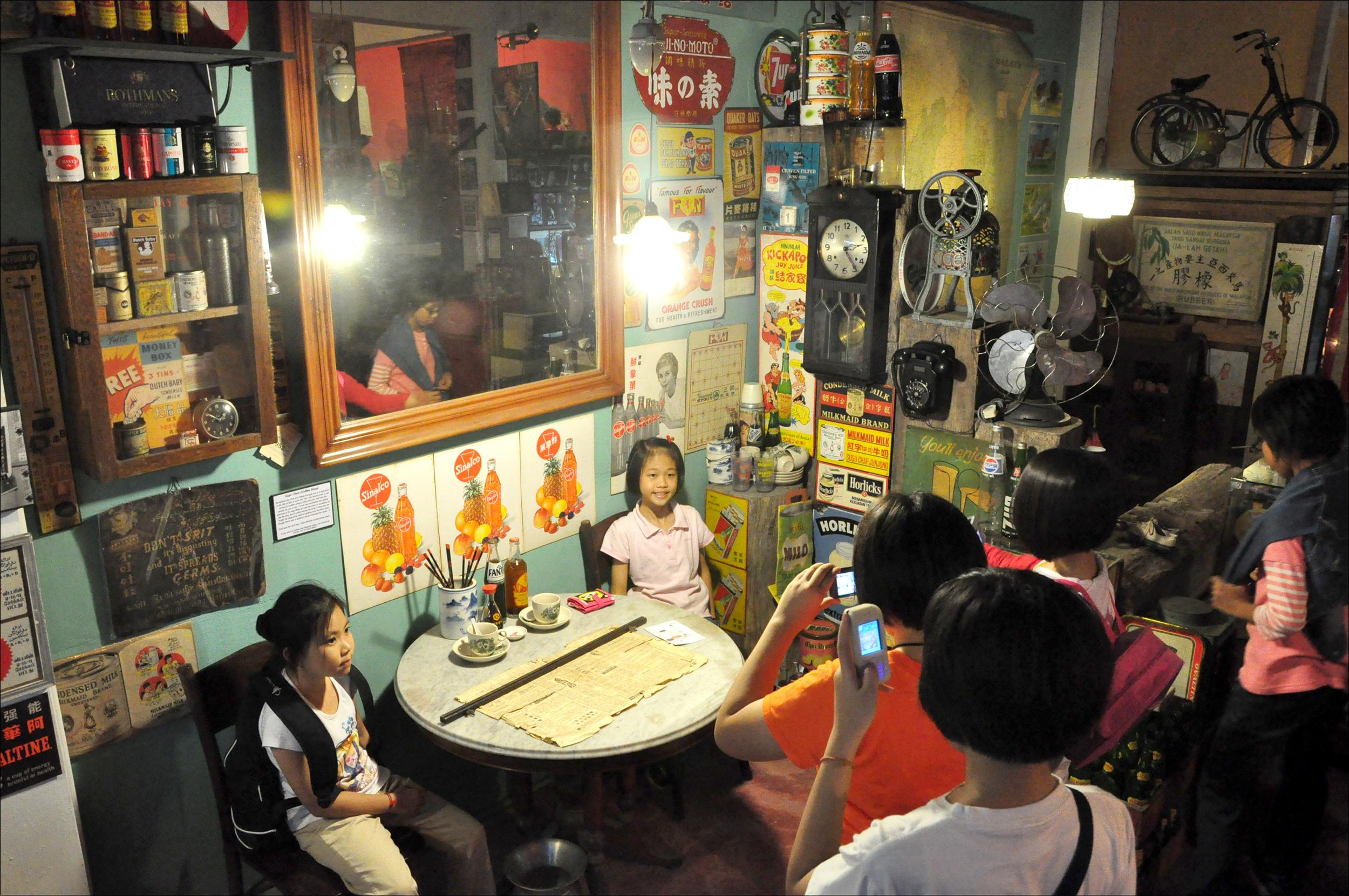
The 'Coffee Shop'

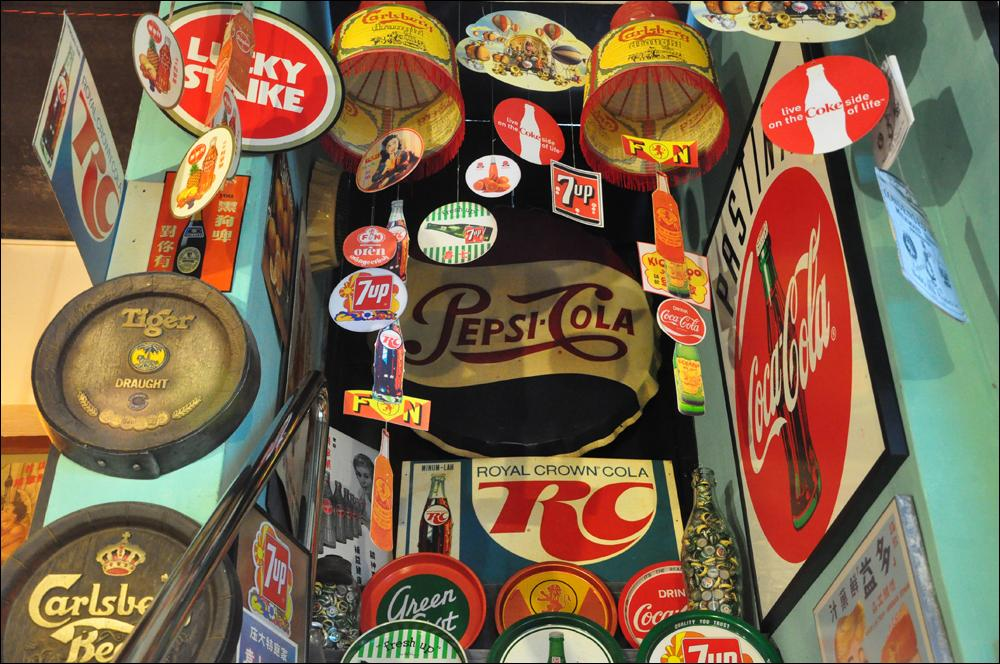
Collectibles

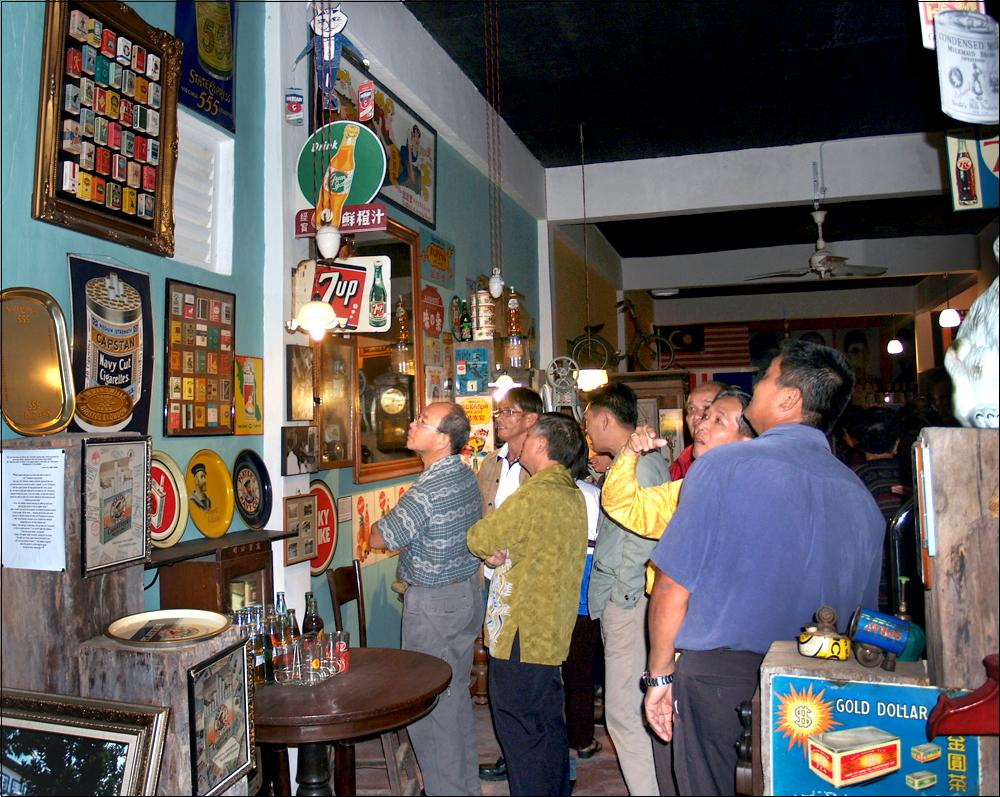
Memorabilia

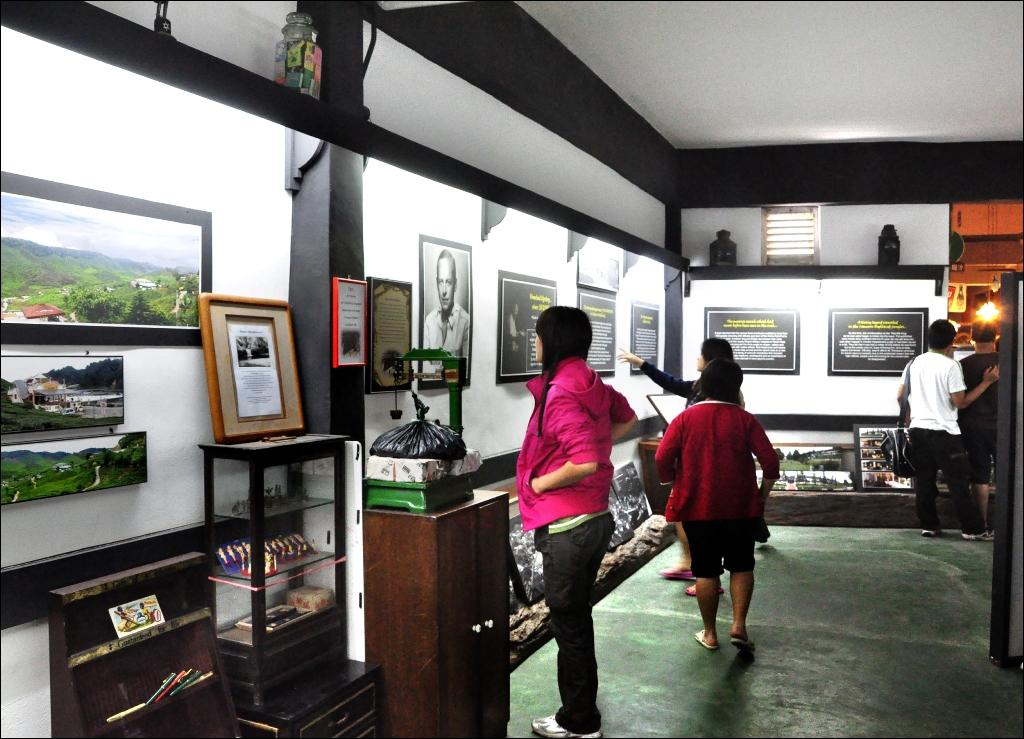
The Jim Thompson Corner

== Milestones ==
The museum was visited by Miss Hong Kong 2008 (Edelweiss Cheung), 1st and 2nd runners-up (Skye Chan and Sia Ma) during their tour of Malaysia in August 2008. Their visit was organised by Hong Kong's Television Broadcasts Limited, Tourism Malaysia and Hong Thai Travel Services.

In June 2018, the museum opened a second space in Ipoh known as the Time Tunnel Ipoh Old Town museum. One of its early visitors was HE Andrew Goledzinowski, the Australian High Commissioner to Malaysia.

== See also ==
- List of museums in Malaysia
