= Tanglin Trust School =

Location
- 95 Portsdown Road; Singapore 139299; Singapore; 1.2974°N 103.7921°E

Information
- Type: Independent
- Established: 1925
- Founder: Anne Griffith-Jones
- Chief Executive Officer: Craig Considine
- Director of Learning: John Ridley
- Teaching staff: 400
- Age: 3 to 18
- Enrollment: 3,500
- Education system: National Curriculum
- Houses: Alexandra, Cameron, Raeburn, Wessex, Weyhill, Portsdown, Winchester, Claymore
- Athletics conference: FOBISIA
- Sports: Athletics, basketball, swimming, touch, football, rugby, netball, tennis, gymnastics, badminton, cricket, golf, tee-ball, softball, floor hockey and volleyball
- Tuition: S$30,030–S$51,810
- Website: https://www.tts.edu.sg/

Tanglin Trust School is an international school in Singapore that runs as a non-profit organisation. Established in 1925, Tanglin Trust School provides British-based learning with an international perspective for students aged 3–18. There are approximately 2,800 students at Tanglin, with 750 in the Infant School, 750 in the Junior School and 1,300 in the Senior School and Sixth Form. Each school has its own building and facilities within the one campus. This School provides a British Currciculum that offers the IGCSE Curriculum in Years 10 and 11 and is the only school to offer both A-Level and IB Diploma in the Sixth Form

Approximately 60–70% of students in the school are British passport holders; however, British people only make up about 30–35%. As of May 2014, 54 nationalities are represented.

== History ==
The school was founded in 1925 by Anne Griffith-Jones. It is the oldest British international school in Southeast Asia. When it first opened, it operated from premises within the Tanglin Club. It began with five students, but soon began to grow rapidly. At the time, many British expatriates living in Singapore sent their children away to boarding school in Britain at an early age. The school offered the alternative of providing British-style education in Singapore, so parents could postpone boarding school until an older age.

In 1934, Griffith-Jones opened a second school – the Tanglin Boarding School in the Cameron Highlands. Again this was intended as a nearby alternative for expatriate families living in the region who would otherwise have to send their children to boarding schools in Britain. Many children who attended the school in Singapore up to the age of eight then went on to the boarding school in the Cameron Highlands, which catered for students up to the age of 13. However the school in Singapore continued to flourish.

The news of many of our children who have left us tells us of the satisfactory places that they have taken at their home schools in England – and educationally that is our chief concern.

— Anne Griffith-Jones,

The Japanese occupation of the Malay Peninsula in 1942 forced the closure of both schools, as British expatriates in the region (including Griffith-Jones) were interned by the Japanese. The schools reopened after the war. From 1948, the unsafe conditions created by Malayan Emergency meant the school in the Cameron Highlands had to be put under full-time armed guard and children were transported to and from school in armoured vehicles at the end and start of term. The Cameron Highlands School was eventually forced to close by the Federal Government for security reasons in 1950 and the school was sold to the British War Office.

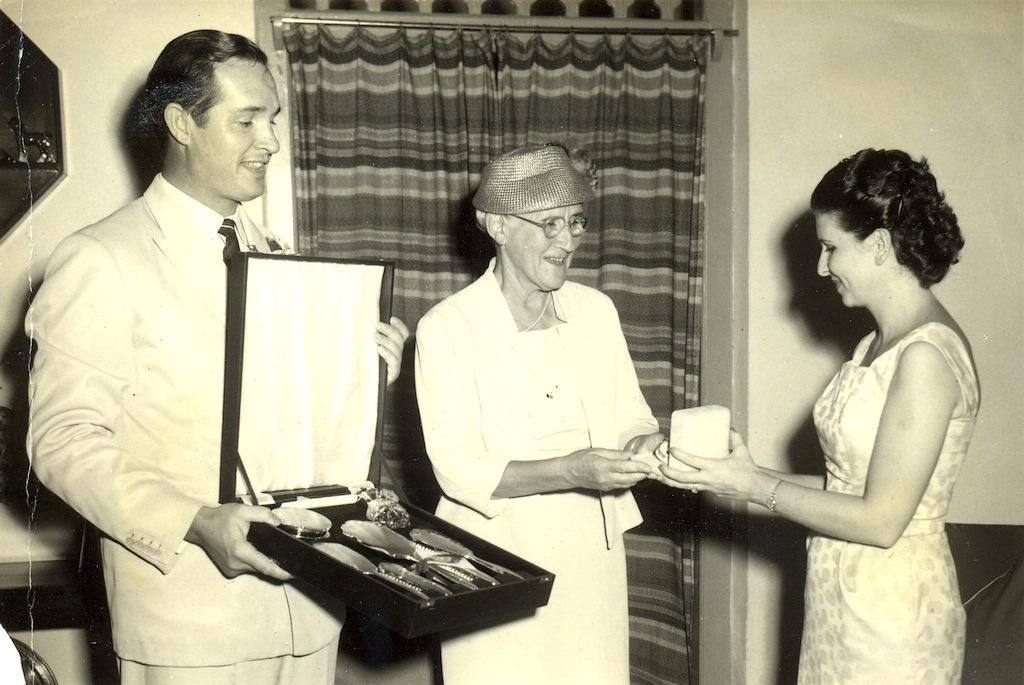
Anne Griffith-Jones (centre) in 1957, receiving retirement gifts from Dr Charles Wilson and Laurette Shearman, two of Tanglin's first intake of pupils

In 1958, Griffith-Jones retired and sold the private company Tanglin School Ltd to the British European Association (now known as the British Association of Singapore) in Singapore. In 1961, governance of the school was handed over to a non-profit education Trust known as the Tanglin Trust Ltd.

In 1971, the Trust opened a second British international primary school in Singapore called Weyhill Preparatory School. Three years later, the Trust also took over the running of another international school in Singapore called Raeburn Park School, which had been opened in 1954 by the Singapore Harbour Board for the children of its expatriate staff. In 1981, the three schools were merged into one at its present campus on Portsdown Road. Initially, the campus housed two largely separate-functioning infant and junior schools known as Tanglin Infant School and Tanglin Junior School. A separate nursery school (known as Winchester Nursery School) also operated at Alexandra Park for twenty years between 1976 and 1996, but this was moved to the new purpose-built Infant School on the Portsdown Road campus in 1996. In the late-1980s, the administration and curriculum of the schools was centralised under a single Head Teacher and in 1996 the name Tanglin Trust School was adopted.

== Academics ==
The English National Curriculum provides the basis for the programmes of study. Infant School students are aged between 3 and 7 and the curriculum they follow is the Early Years Foundation Stage in Nursery and Reception followed by Key Stage 1 in Years 1 and 2. Students in the Junior School, aged between 7 and 11, follow Key Stage 2 in Years 3 to 6. Students in the Senior School, including those in the Sixth Form, are aged 11 to 18 years. They study Key Stages 3 in Years 7 to 9; Key Stage 4 in Years 10 and 11; and Key Stage 5 in Years 12 and 13. As students progress through Key Stage 3 to 5 of the English National Curriculum, they are presented with a widening choice of subjects to choose from for their International General Certificate of Secondary Education (IGCSE) and A Level or IB examinations. Tanglin is inspected every three years as part of the British Schools Overseas (BSO) inspection framework. The school has been repeatedly described by UK inspectors as Outstanding, the highest possible grade.

=== Notable alumni ===
- Daniel Bennett – professional football player for the Singapore national football team and in Singapore's S.League
- Ming Bridges – Singaporean singer-songwriter, actress and model
- Romola Garai – British actress
- Stuart Grimes – former Scottish Rugby captain
- Blair McDonough – Australian actor
- Laura Robson – British Tennis Player
- Mimi Slinger – English actress
- James Wong – botanist and BBC television presenter
- Finn Elliot – young actor

== See also ==
- Education in Singapore
- International Baccalaureate
