= Cameron Highlands =

Cameron Highlands District Tanah Tinggi Cameron (Malay)
- District of Pahang and hill station
- Daerah Cameron Highlands
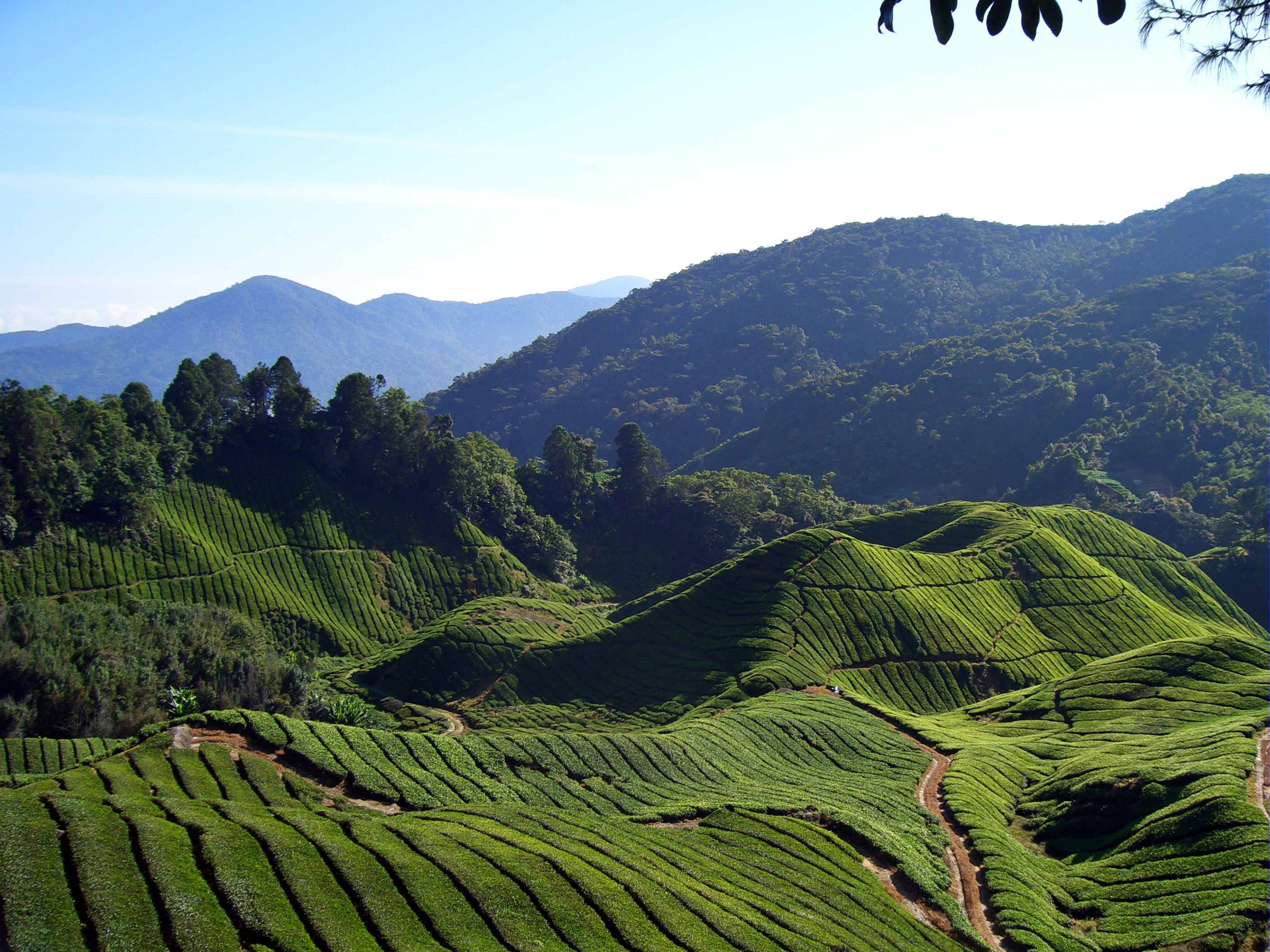
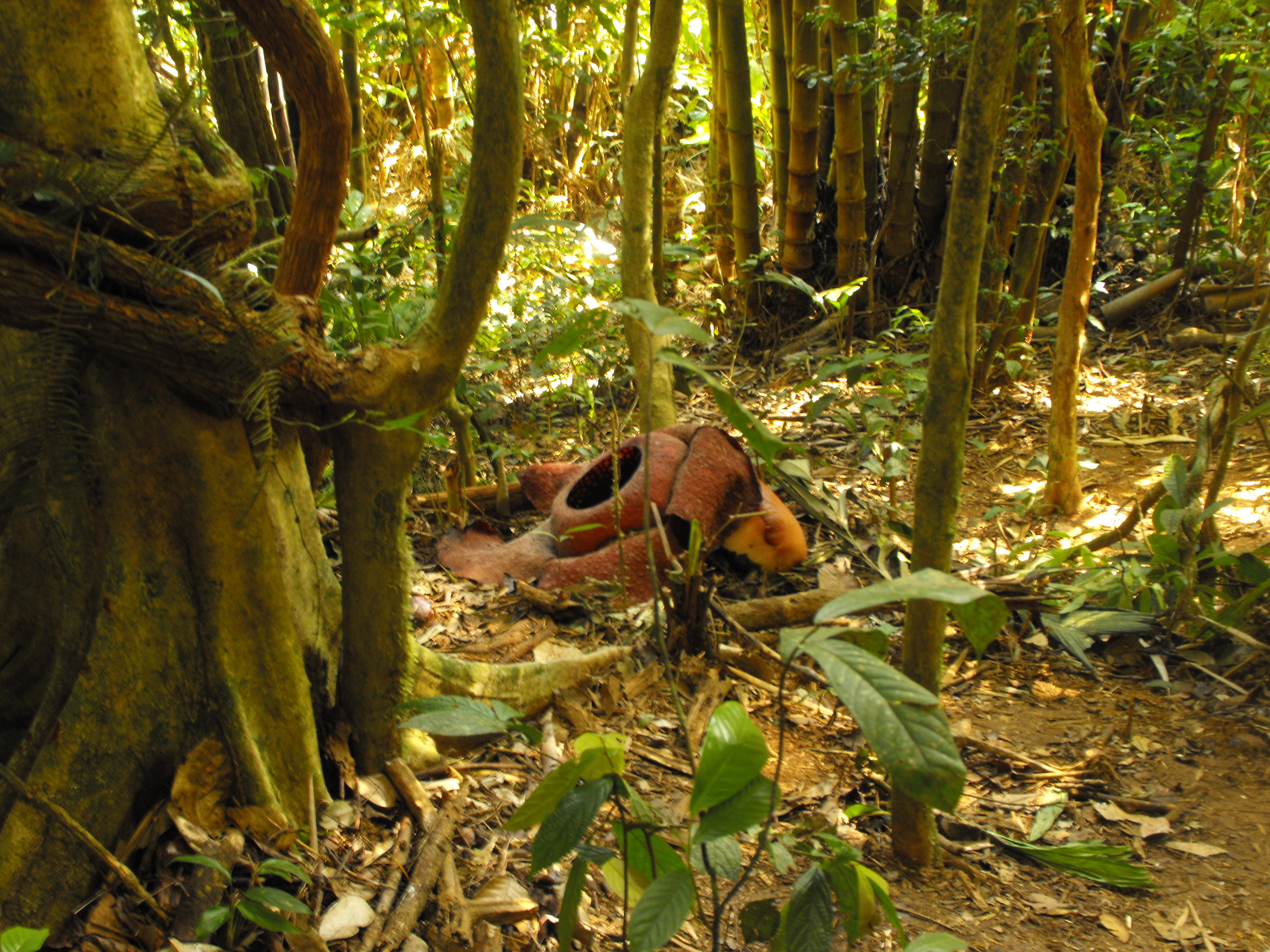
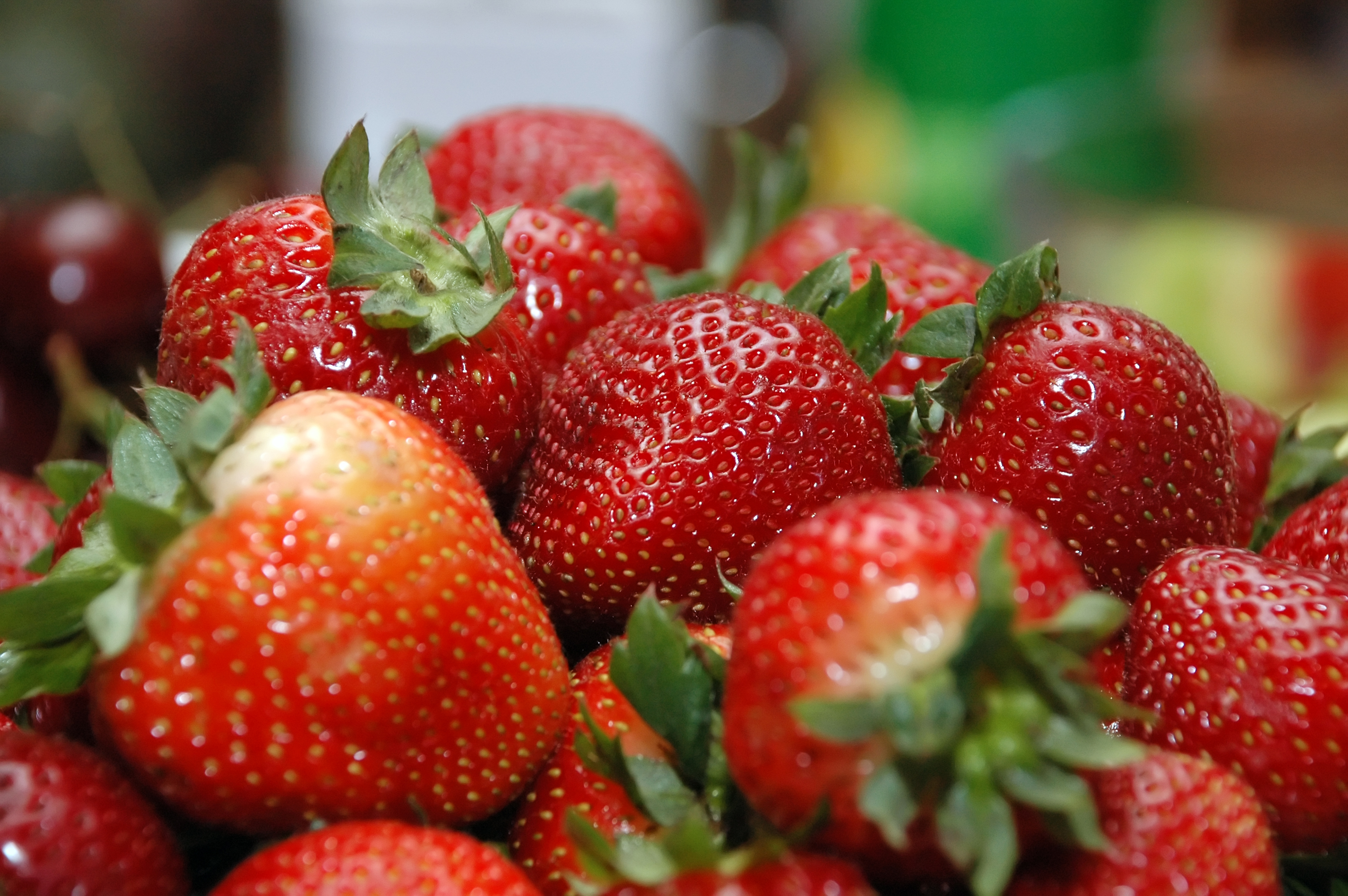
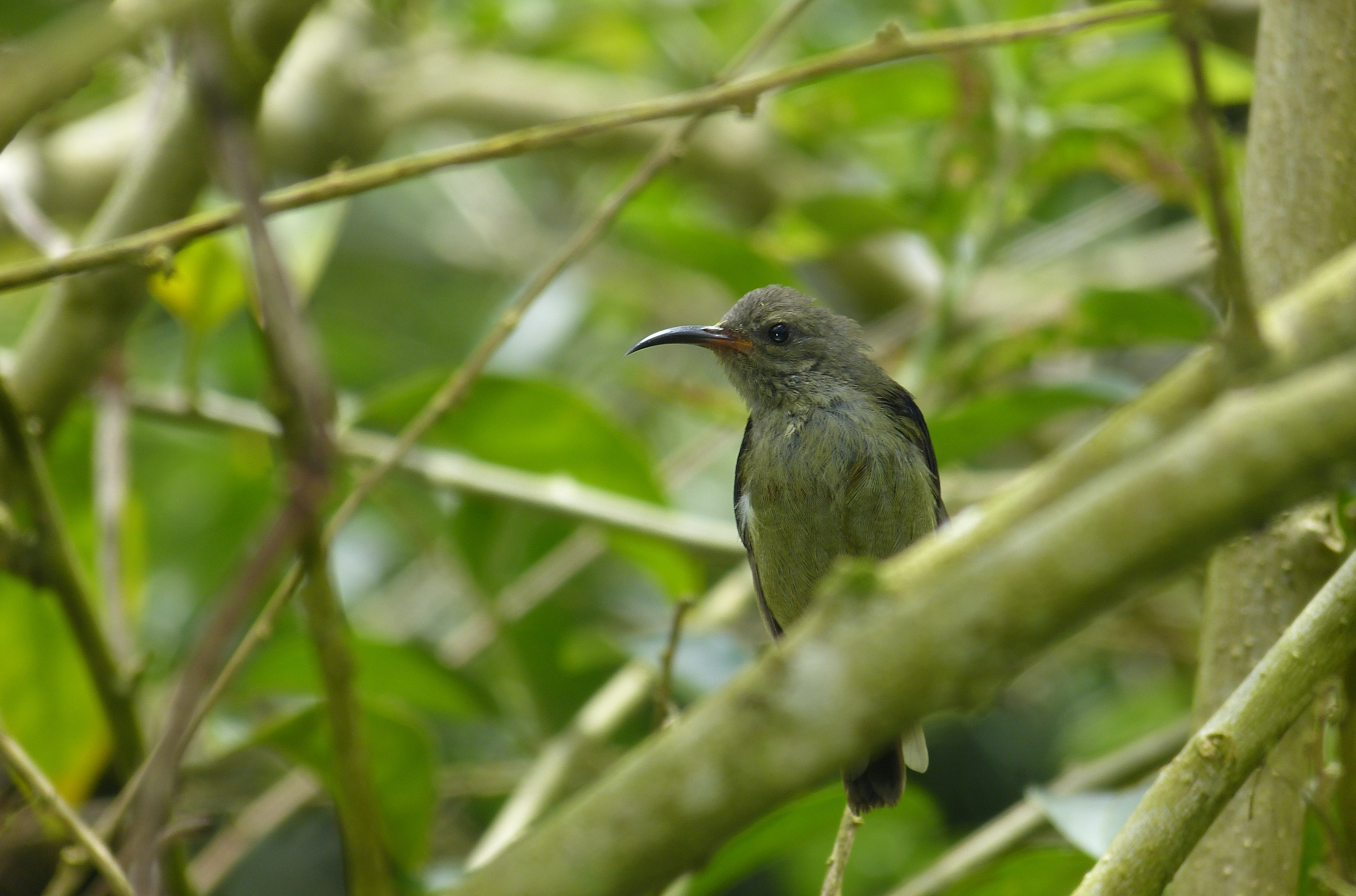
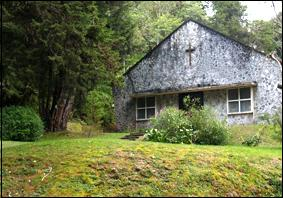
- Top down: Tea plantation • Rafflesia plant • Strawberries (left) • Black-throated sunbird (right) • All Souls' Church.

- Seal
- Etymology: Named after William Cameron, a British explorer and geologist.
- Location of Cameron Highlands District in Pahang
- Interactive map of Cameron Highlands District
- Location of Cameron Highlands District in Peninsular Malaysia Location of Cameron Highlands District in Malaysia
- Coordinates: 4°30′N 101°30′E
- Country: Malaysia
- State: Pahang
- Surveyed: 1885 by William Cameron
- Seat: Tanah Rata
- Local area government(s): Cameron Highlands District Council

Government
  - President: Zainal-Abidin Amin

Area (MDCH operation area)
  - Total: 712.18 km^{2} (274.97 sq mi)

Population (2019)
  - Total: 43,700
  - Density: 61.4/km^{2} (159/sq mi)
  - Demonym: Cameron Highlander
- Time zone: UTC+08:00 (MST)
- Postcode: 39xxx
- Calling code: +6-05
- Vehicle registration plates: C
- Website: www.mdcameron.gov.my

The Cameron Highlands (Malay: Tanah Tinggi Cameron) is a district in Pahang, Malaysia, occupying an area of 712.18 square kilometres (274.97 sq mi). To the north, its boundary touches that of Kelantan; to the west, it shares part of its border with Perak. Situated at the northwestern tip of Pahang, Cameron Highlands is approximately 90 kilometres (56 mi) east from Ipoh, roughly 200 kilometres (120 mi) north from Kuala Lumpur or about 355 kilometres (221 mi) from Kuantan, the capital of Pahang. It is the smallest municipality in the state.

Surveyed by the government geologist and explorer William Cameron in 1885, the outpost consists of three mukims (subdistricts), namely Ringlet, Tanah Rata and Ulu Telom. Its eight settlements are Ringlet, Tanah Rata (the administrative centre), Brinchang, the Bertam Valley, Kea Farm, Tringkap, Kampung Kuala Terla, Kampung Raja and Blue Valley. All are nestled at elevations ranging from 800 metres (2,600 ft) to 1,603 metres (5,259 ft) above sea level.

Developed in the 1930s, the tableland is one of the oldest tourist spots in Malaysia. Apart from its tea estates, the plateau is noted for its cool weather, orchards, nurseries, farmlands, cream tea culture, waterfalls, rivers, lakes, wildlife, mossy forest, golf course, hotels, places of worship, bungalows, Land Rovers, museum and native inhabitants (Orang Asli).

== Background ==
The Cameron Highlands were named after William Cameron, a Scottish explorer and geologist who was commissioned by the colonial government to map out the Pahang-Perak border area in 1885.

In a statement concerning his mapping expedition, Cameron mentioned he saw "a sort of vortex on the mountains, while for a (reasonably) wide area we have gentle slopes and plateau land." When approached, Sir Hugh Low, the Resident of Perak (1887–1889), expressed the wish of developing the region into a "sanatorium, health resort and open farmland." A narrow path to Cameron Highlands was then carved through the jungle. Nothing much happened after that.

Forty years later, the tableland was given another review when Sir George Maxwell (1871–1959) visited the locale to see if it could be turned into a resort. He spent about nine days surveying the territory. Maxwell described the terrain as being "somewhat oval in shape on his return from the highlands." After comparing it with Nuwara Eliya in Sri Lanka and Baguio in the Philippines, he decreed that the site should be developed into a hill station.

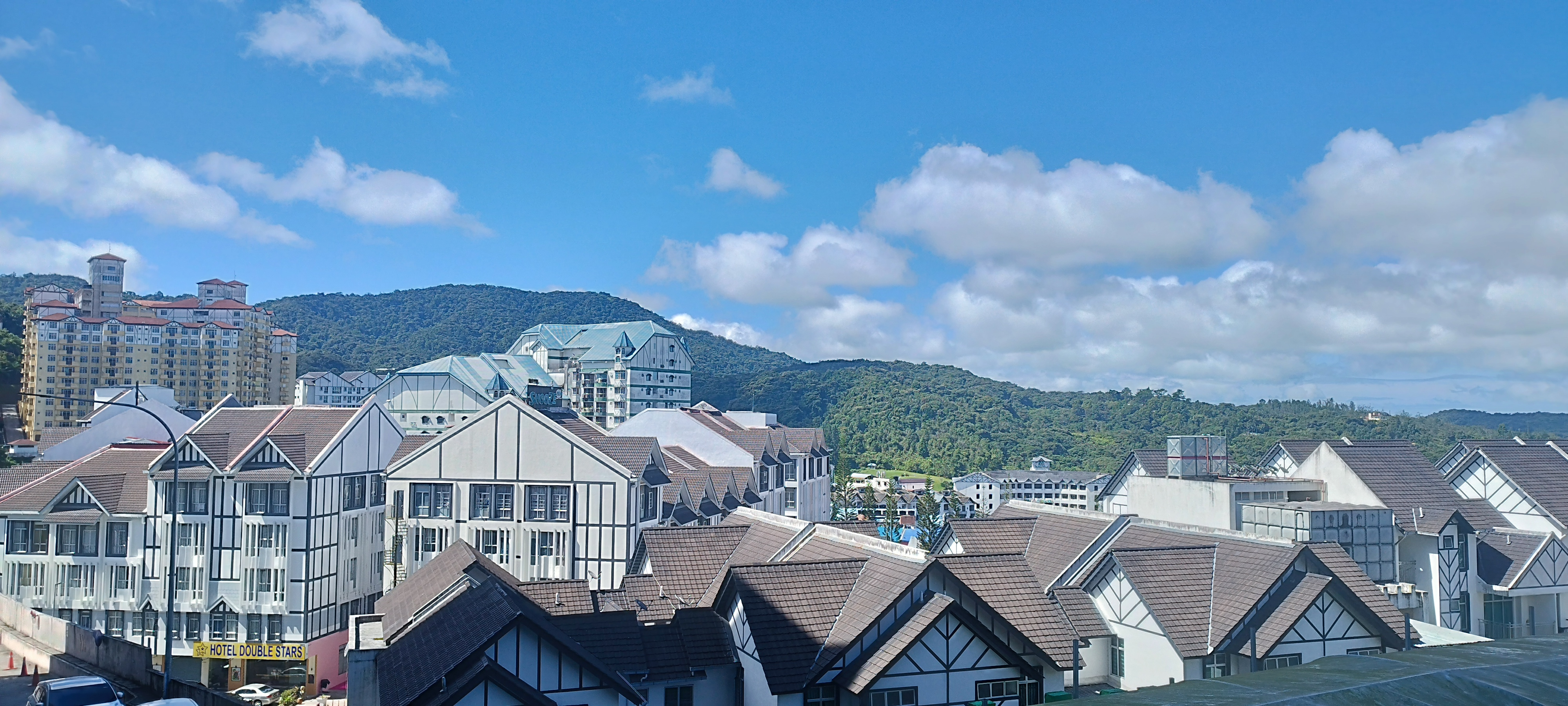
Township of Brinchang (c. 2026).

In mid-1925, an Agricultural Experiment Station was set up to confirm if cinchona, tea, coffee, fruits and vegetables could be grown at the district. In December 1925, a superintendent was appointed to supervise the 200-acre (81-ha) plantation on Mount Beremban. While research at the station was being carried out, the colonial office assigned Captain C.C. Best, a surveyor from the Federated Malay States to trace the Telom River (Malay: Sungei Telom). The Annual Report of the Survey Department (1925) states he explored "the Ulu of the Telom which was the actual area traversed by Cameron" and "he went first to what is known as Cameron Highlands to obtain a basis of comparison and from there crossed over into the Telom Valley. He made a reconnaissance map of the headwaters of the Telom and his exploration has established definitely that the area at the Ulu of the Bertang (Bertam?) is incomparably the most suitable for development." This report, coupled with the confirmation that tea could also be grown, gave the British the motivation to develop the place.

In 1926, a development committee was formed to zone off the moorlands agriculture, defense, administration, housing, and recreation. Later, a three-million-dollar road was constructed from Tapah to the highlands. It started from the 19th mile Tapah-Pahang Road and ended at Ginting "B" (Tanah Rata). The three-year contract was awarded to Messrs. Fogden, Brisbane and Company. The first installment of $250,000 was made in 1926. The project commenced on 1 January 1928; it was completed on Friday, 14 November 1930 – 47 days ahead of schedule. The building of the road was a challenge: the crew not only had to deal with the weather; they also had to cope with the risk of being struck down with malaria. The manning level varied from 500 to 3,000 workers during the construction stage. Throughout the contract, 375 employees were hospitalized for fever. The biggest problem faced by the contractor was the haulage of heavy equipment from the lowlands to the upper reaches. This setback was overcome with the use of steam-driven locomotives which were designed for work on steep gradients.

When the road was opened in 1931, the British and the locals moved in to settle on the slopes of the mountain. They were soon followed by tea planters and vegetable growers who found the climate to be suitable for the growth of their crops. On 1 July 1931, Cameron Highlands was made an autonomous sub-district under Kuala Lipis, with its own Deputy District Officer subordinate to the Lipis District Officer. By the mid-1930s, there was a notable improvement in the constituency: it now had a six-hole golf course, several cottages, three inns, a police post, two boarding schools, a military camp, a dairy, a horse spelling ranch, nurseries, vegetable farms, tea plantations, a Government Rest House and an Agricultural Experiment Station. The domain continued to grow until the outbreak of the Second World War. During the Japanese Occupation of the Malay Peninsula (1942–1945), there was hardly any development in the area. When the Japanese withdrew in August 1945, the place transformed. This, however, came to a halt during the Malayan Emergency (1948–1960). When the conflict ended, Cameron Highlands" experienced a constant change in its landscape. Today, the haven is not only the biggest and best known of Malaysia's hill stations; it is also the highest point in Peninsular Malaysia accessible by car.

== Demographics ==
Historical population
Year	Pop.	±%
1991	25,555	—
2000	28,077	+9.9%
2010	36,978	+31.7%
2020	39,004	+5.5%
Source: Department of Statistics, Malaysia

Ethnic groups in Cameron Highlands District (2010 census)
Ethnicity	Population	Percentage
Chinese	13,099	39.4%
Bumiputera	12,989	39.0%
Indian	6,988	21.0%
Others	202	0.6%
Total	33,278	100%

The district has a diverse population of 33,278 people. It comprises Chinese (13,099), Bumiputeras (12,989) — Malays (7,321); others (mainly Orang Aslis (5,688) — Indians (6,988), non-Malaysian citizens (5,193), and other nationalities (202). Most of the residents are entrepreneurs, service industry employees, farm workers, retirees or government servants.

== Politics ==
Previously contested as part of Kuala Lipis, parliamentary representation for Cameron Highlands was granted in 2004. Though named as such, the Cameron Highlands also covers a few areas that are outside the ward. For instance, the FELDA settlement of Sungai Koyan, which is represented by the Cameron Highlands in the federal parliament, is located in the district of Kuala Lipis. The Cameron Highlands itself contributes two seats to the Pahang State Legislative Assembly — Tanah Rata and Jelai. The Tanah Rata constituency covers the entire district of the Cameron Highlands; the Jelai constituency covers the western part of Kuala Lipis which includes Sungai Koyan and some other FELDA settlements.

== Geography ==
Map of Cameron Highlands district.

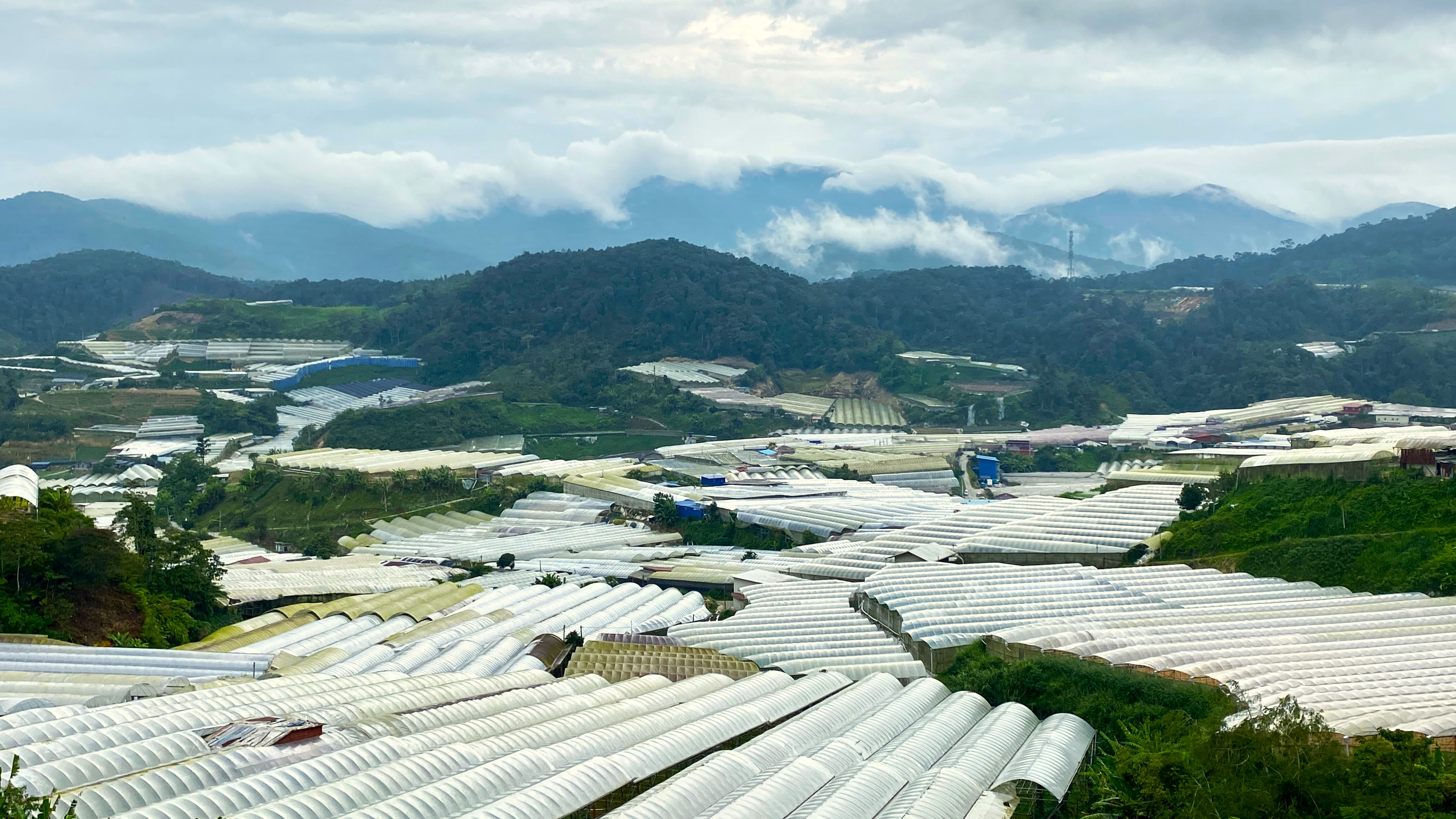
The Titiwangsa Mountains rises over Kampung Raja in the northern part of the highlands.

The Cameron Highlands is one of the 11 districts of Pahang. Occupying an area of 712 square kilometres (275 sq mi), the district comprises three townships and five settlements. Tucked up high in the Pahangese and Perakian sections of the Titiwangsa Mountains, the mountainous spine of Peninsular Malaysia, it owes its present standing to its location at a high altitude (generally between 800 metres (2,600 ft) to 1,603 metres (5,259 ft) above sea level). There are eight mountains (gunung in Malay) at the retreat. They are Mts. Brinchang (2,031 metres (6,663 ft)), Berembun (1,840 metres (6,040 ft)), Irau (2,091 metres (6,860 ft)), Jasar (1,696 metres (5,564 ft)), Mentigi (1,563 metres (5,128 ft)), Perdah (1,576 metres (5,171 ft)) and Siku (1,916 metres (6,286 ft)). Mount Swettenham (1,961 metres (6,434 ft)) is located on its border with Kelantan. At the top of Mount Brinchang is a radio and television station. It was constructed by the British in the early 1950s. Close to it is the famed mossy forest. The trail to the forest starts from the BOH Sungei Palas Tea Plantation. It takes about 15 minutes to reach the cloud forest by road.

Cameron Highlands is unique compared to the other hill stations in Malaysia — three river systems drain it with numerous tributaries (totaling 123). Their high points serve as the water catchment for the Pahang and Perak rivers (Malay: Sungai Pahang and Sungai Perak).

Overall, much of the retreat is still forested (estimated at 71%). Jungle trails lead visitors to tranquil spots, waterfalls, and aboriginal villages. Most of the tracks begin at Tanah Rata. There are more than ten paths to pick and choose from. Depending on its distance, some routes can take as long as five hours to cover. Apart from its numerous walks, the sanctuary is also known for its native inhabitants, the Orang Asli, who rely on the land for subsistence farming, hunting, and fishing. Many have left to take up residence in the nearby towns. There are still some who prefer to treat the woods as their home. To date, there have been many changes at the resort. During the colonial era, the county was developed to be "a healthy hill station similar to Nuwara Eliya." Today, it is different. During the Post-Independence Period (1957–1973), vast tracts of land were cleared for agriculture and infrastructure development. After 1974, more land was cleared for agriculture, housing projects, power plants, logging activities, livestock farming, hotel construction, small-scale industries, human resettlement, and road building. There is no doubt that some advances have brought economic benefits. This, however, has come with a price. Over the years, the "development (in this area) has been at the expense of the weather and the environment," as well as the indigenous communities' consent.

=== Biodiversity ===
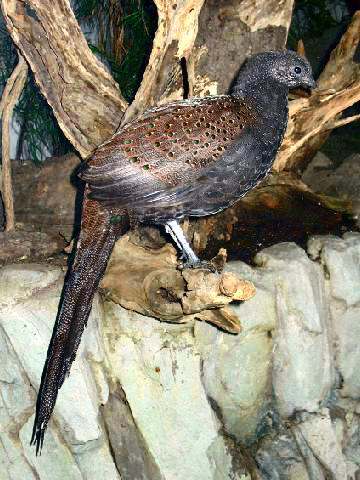
A Malaysian mountain peacock-pheasant. It is listed in the 2004 IUCN Red List of Threatened Species.

Cameron Highlands is one of the few places in Malaysia that serves as a habitat for a wide variety of flora and fauna, as well as hosting a totally different ecosystem. There are more than 700 species of plants that grow here. The vegetation changes as one ascends the mountain. The ward is known for its tea growing, vegetable farms and flower nurseries. Its woodlands form the prevailing natural ecosystem within and around the prefecture. Of the fauna, the Sumatran serow, mountain peacock-pheasant and Malayan whistling-thrush are listed in the 2004 IUCN Red List of Threatened Species. In 1958, the outpost was declared as deer reserve. Four years later, it became a venue affording protection to animals and birds.

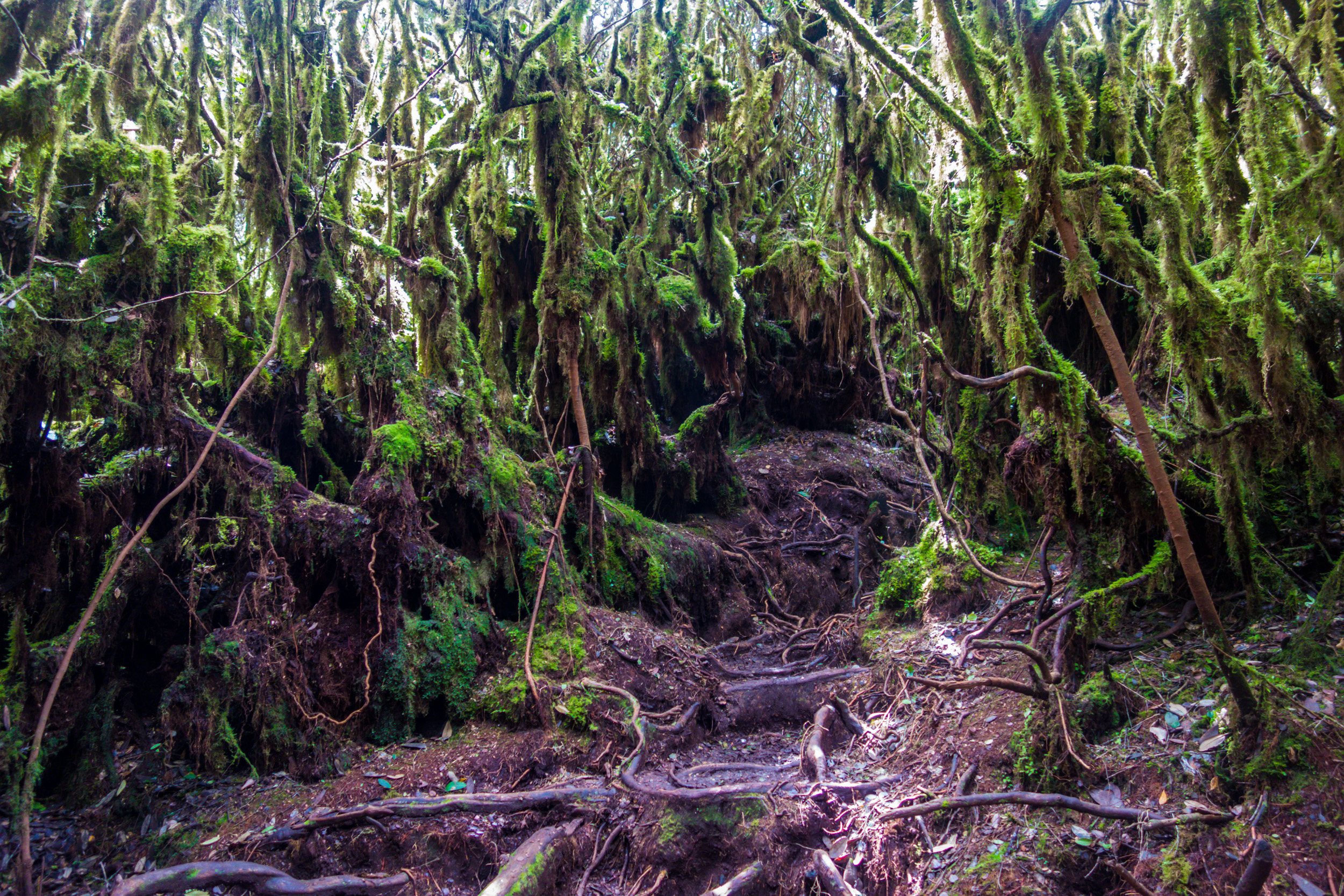
Mossy forest on Mount Irau, is one of the highest peaks in the Cameron Highlands

=== Climate ===
Cameron Highlands features a subtropical highland climate with uniform precipitation (Köppen climate classification Cfb). Its mean annual temperature is 18 °C (64 °F). During the day, the temperature seldom rises over 25 °C (77 °F); at night, it can drop to as low as 9 °C (48 °F) at the higher reaches. Its yearly precipitation is more than 2,700 mm (110 in). The lowest temperature recorded was on Wednesday, 1 February 1978 – the temperature dropped to 7.8 °C (46.0 °F) at an altitude of 1,471.6 metres above sea level.

Climate data for Cameron Highlands
Month	Jan	Feb	Mar	Apr	May	Jun	Jul	Aug	Sep	Oct	Nov	Dec	Year
Record high °C (°F)	25.7 (78.3)	27.4 (81.3)	26.6 (79.9)	27.0 (80.6)	27.9 (82.2)	26.5 (79.7)	26.6 (79.9)	25.6 (78.1)	26.5 (79.7)	26.2 (79.2)	26.1 (79.0)	25.7 (78.3)	27.9 (82.2)
Mean daily maximum °C (°F)	21.4 (70.5)	22.4 (72.3)	23.0 (73.4)	23.4 (74.1)	23.2 (73.8)	22.8 (73.0)	22.4 (72.3)	22.0 (71.6)	22.0 (71.6)	21.8 (71.2)	21.7 (71.1)	21.1 (70.0)	22.3 (72.1)
Daily mean °C (°F)	17.2 (63.0)	17.6 (63.7)	18.2 (64.8)	18.7 (65.7)	18.7 (65.7)	18.4 (65.1)	18.0 (64.4)	17.8 (64.0)	17.7 (63.9)	17.6 (63.7)	17.6 (63.7)	17.2 (63.0)	17.9 (64.2)
Mean daily minimum °C (°F)	14.6 (58.3)	14.7 (58.5)	15.2 (59.4)	15.8 (60.4)	16.1 (61.0)	15.6 (60.1)	15.3 (59.5)	15.3 (59.5)	15.3 (59.5)	15.3 (59.5)	15.3 (59.5)	14.9 (58.8)	15.3 (59.5)
Record low °C (°F)	10.9 (51.6)	10.0 (50.0)	11.6 (52.9)	13.4 (56.1)	14.2 (57.6)	13.4 (56.1)	13.5 (56.3)	13.6 (56.5)	13.1 (55.6)	13.3 (55.9)	12.0 (53.6)	12.1 (53.8)	10.0 (50.0)
Average rainfall mm (inches)	109.5 (4.31)	115.1 (4.53)	198.4 (7.81)	275.7 (10.85)	268.8 (10.58)	145.1 (5.71)	162.1 (6.38)	180.2 (7.09)	244.8 (9.64)	334.7 (13.18)	300.6 (11.83)	203.1 (8.00)	2,538.1 (99.91)
Average rainy days	14	12	17	20	21	15	16	18	22	25	24	20	224
Average relative humidity (%)	84	83	84	91	92	90	90	91	92	93	93	92	90
Source: Malaysian Meteorological Department

== Transportation ==
The Cameron Highlands can be accessed by road via Tapah, Simpang Pulai, Gua Musang or Sungai Koyan. Tapah and Simpang Pulai are the two approaches from Perak. Gua Musang and Sungai Koyan are the entryways from Kelantan and Pahang, respectively.

=== Car ===
Until the 1990s the only access road to the Cameron Highlands was by Federal Route 59 which begins in Tapah, Perak. In 2004, a new access road was opened — Federal Route 185 — connecting Simpang Pulai (about a kilometre south of Ipoh, Perak) through the northern part of the Highlands and Gua Musang in southern Kelantan before terminating in Kampung Kuala Jenderis in Hulu Terengganu, Terengganu.

By 2010 a third access route was opened — Federal Route 102 — connecting Ringlet to FELDA Sungai Koyan, near Kuala Lipis. With the opening of this route, motorists from the other parts of Pahang (especially Kuantan) are now able to access the district of Cameron Highlands without having to leave the state. There is another route to the hill station — the Pahang State Route (C5). It links Sungai Koyan to Raub which is the gateway to Fraser's Hill.

=== Public transportation ===
As with most of western Pahang, the Cameron Highlands is not served by any KTM railway station, the closest being in Kuala Lipis and Tapah Road. Nevertheless, several bus services connect the Highlands to the cities and towns, such as Singapore, Kuala Lumpur, Ipoh, Penang and Tapah.

== Federal Parliament and State Assembly Seats ==
List of Cameron Highlands district representatives in the Federal Parliament (Dewan Rakyat)

Parliament	Seat Name	Member of Parliament	Party
P78	Cameron Highlands	Ramli Mohd. Nor	Barisan Nasional (UMNO)

List of Cameron Highlands district representatives in the State Legislative Assembly (Dewan Undangan Negeri)

Parliament	State	Seat Name	State Assemblyman	Party
P78	N1	Tanah Rata	Ho Chi Yang	Pakatan Harapan (DAP)

== See also ==
- Geography of Malaysia
- Environment of Malaysia
- Landmarks in Cameron Highlands
- Settlements in Cameron Highlands
