= All Souls' Church, Cameron Highlands =

All Souls' Church
- Malay: Gereja Para Arwah; Tamil: இறந்த விசுவாசிகள் அனைவரின் தேவாலயம்
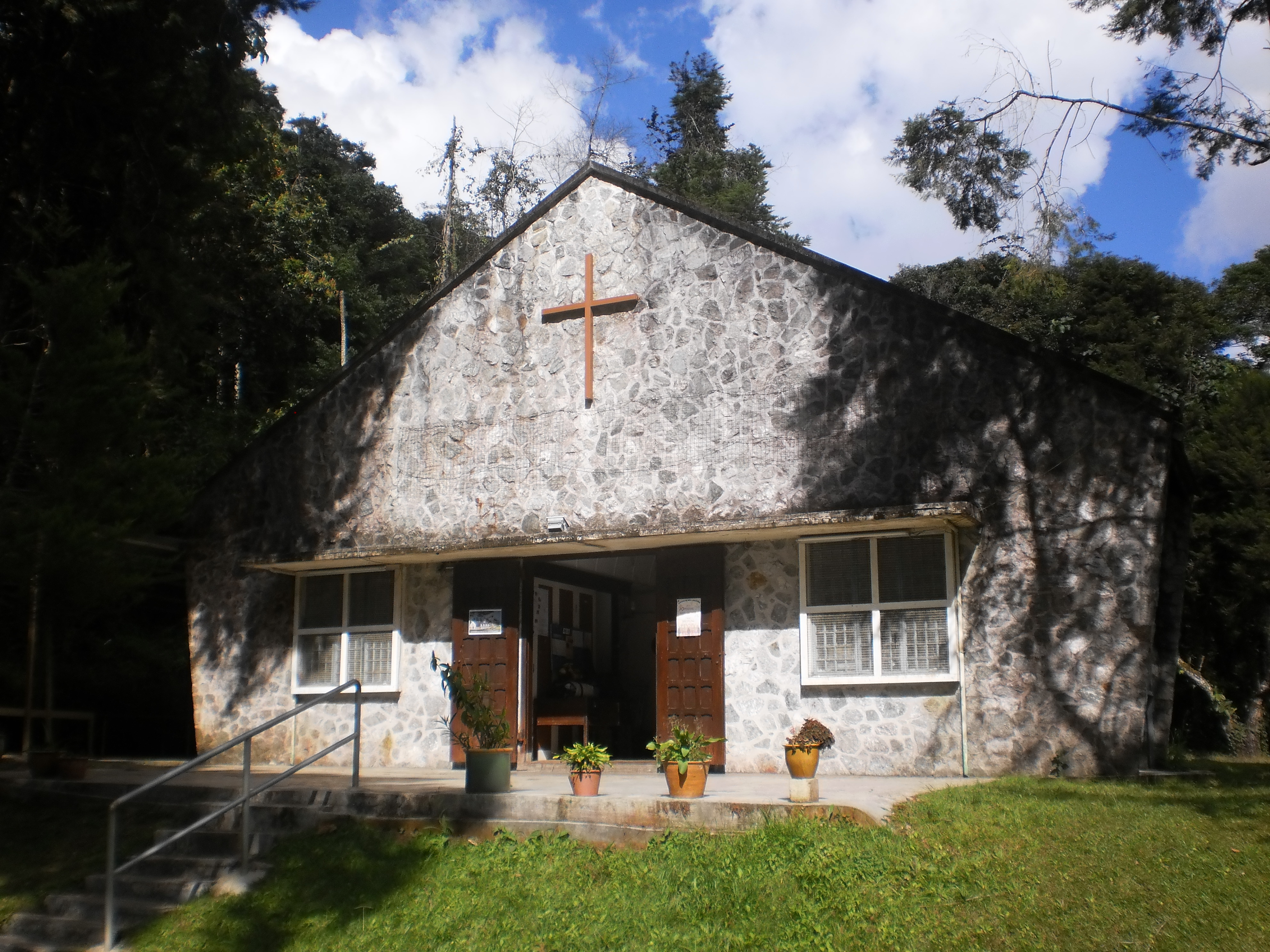
- Front view of All Souls’ Church.
- All Souls' Church
- 4.480667°N 101.381096°E
- Location: Jalan Pejabat Hutan, Taman Sedia, 39000, Tanah Rata, Cameron Highlands, Pahang, Malaysia
- Denomination: Anglican

History
- Consecrated: Thursday, 20 April 1959

Architecture
- Style: “Nissen” Hut
- Completed: September 1958

Administration
- Province: Church of the Province of South East Asia
- Diocese: Anglican Diocese of West Malaysia
- Archdeaconry: Eastern Archdeaconry

Clergy
- Priest: Ven. Canon Jacob G. John

All Souls’ Church (Abbreviation: ASC) is located in the Cameron Highlands, Pahang, Malaysia. Founded in 1958, the church is affiliated to the Anglican Diocese of West Malaysia and the Council of Churches, Malaysia.

== History ==
All Souls’ Church, previously known as the Cameron Highlands Church, was erected in 1958. It was initially attached to St. John's Church in Ipoh, Perak. The then committee members were Captain Hugh Fitzherbert Bloxham (Police Force, Tanah Rata), Mr. E.G. Waller (District Officer), Major Raymond Thomas (Commander, OC Troops), Major W.R. Stokes (Headmaster, Slim School), Mr. Hogarth (Chefoo School), Mr. Whitelaw (District Engineer), Rev. G.A. Williamson (OMF, Tapah), Mr. Sales (Clerk of Works), Miss Dove and Miss Anne L.P. Griffith-Jones.

The history of ASC dates back to the 1950s when the Vicar of St. John’s Church in Perak and other expatriate clergy held regular services at the Cameron Highlands Hotel (now the Cameron Highlands Resort), the Eastern Hotel (which is the present site of the Century Pines Resort), Slim School (currently the home of the Malaysian Commando Unit) and Tanglin Boarding School (which is now Bala’s Holiday Chalet). Church records show that the Rt. Rev. Anthony Charles Dumper visited the congregation at Slim School in early 1950. The first confirmation service was held in 1952

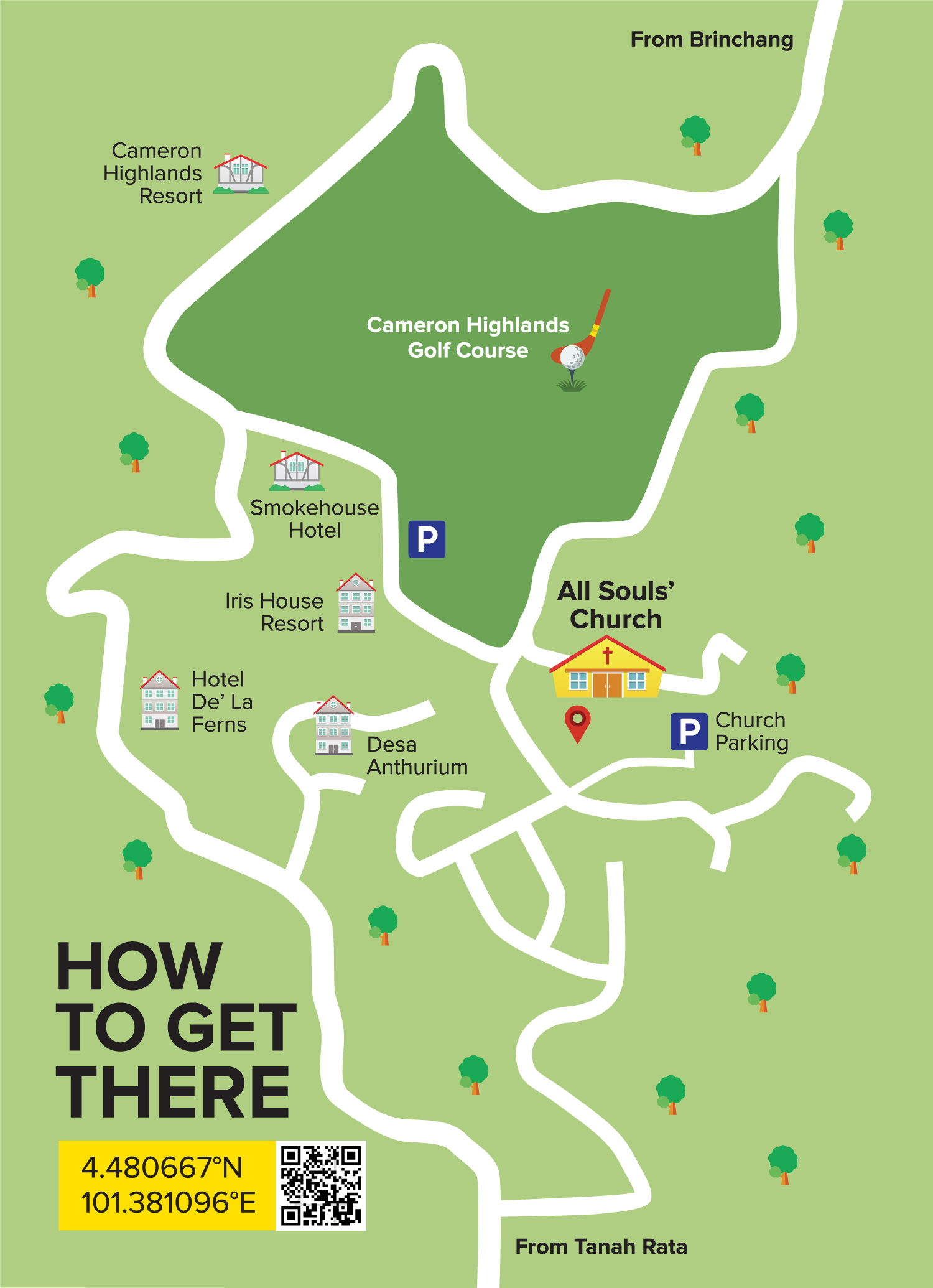
Location map of All Souls’ Church.

During the Malayan Emergency (1948–1960) there was a rapid increase in the number of British troops stationed in the Cameron Highlands. Army chaplains visited the “Camerons” to hold weekly services at either the Eastern Hotel or Slim School.

In early 1958, Miss Anne L.P. Griffith-Jones, OBE (1890–1973) transferred a piece of land near the Slim School grounds to the diocese on the understanding that a church would be built on it.

The construction of the church began in 1958. The British Armed Forces provided a dismantled Nissen hut for erection as a church and also donated a sum of RM$1,000 towards the total erection costs of RM$4,643. Part of this money also came from the European planter families from Kampong Kuantan and Kuala Selangor.

The erection of the church was completed in September 1958. The name "All Souls’ Church" was given at its consecration on 20 April 1959 by the Rt. Rev. Bishop Henry W. Baines, Bishop of Singapore and Malaya to commemorate the soldiers who died in the two World Wars. The first service was conducted by Rev. G.A. Williamson on 11 September 1958.

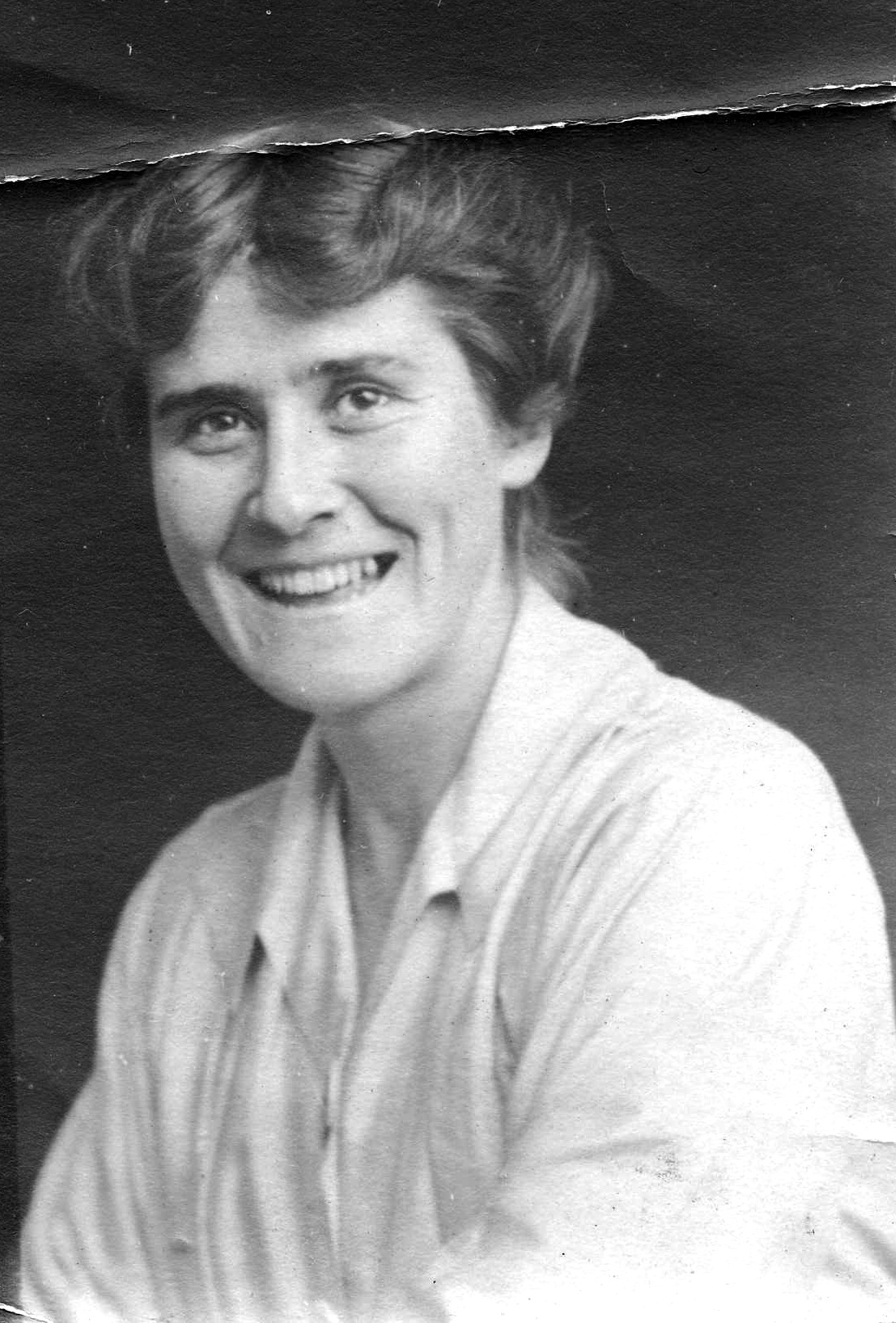
Miss Anne Griffith-Jones, OBE.

NEW CHURCH IN
CAMERON HIGHLANDS

A small church is being erected in Cameron Highlands for inter-denominational Christian worship on land which was formerly a part of Tanglin School playground.

Donations will be appreciated from Tanglin Old Boys and Girls who would like to be associated with the church and from past and present Slim School pupils, and from those who have happy memories of holidays spent in the Highlands.

Donations will be acknowledged by the C.H. Church Secretary Miss A.L. Griffith-Jones, Tanglin, Cameron Highlands, Malaya.

A.L. GRIFFITH-JONES (Miss)
(Letter to the editor, The Straits Times,
20 September 1958, page 10)

At the outset, ASC was ministered to by chaplains of the British Armed Forces and the expatriate clergy from the Overseas Missionary Fellowship who were seconded to the Diocese of West Malaysia. Among these were the Rev. G.A. Williamson (1952–1960), Rev. Whitaker (1957), Rev. C.K. Davis (1958), Rev. K. Oliver (1958), Rev. P. Scott (1959), Rev. J.G.C. Thistle (1959–1960), Rev. T.O. Sturdy (1959–1960), Rev. G. Baker (1960–1961), Rev. Donald H. Temple (1960–1961), Rev. Vokes (1961). Rev. Fred Collard (1965–1974) and Rev. David H. Uttley (1970–1971). All Souls’ Church later became a part of the Parish of South Perak and in 1986 it became a member church of the Parish of Batang Padang, Tapah, Perak.

Since its origination, All Souls’ Church has been governed by an independent committee comprising lay members of the church. The first Malaysian clergy who ministered at ASC, were the clergy from Emmanuel Church in Tapah, Perak. They were the Rev. Moses Elisha Ponniah (1975–1979), Rev. Samuel D. John (1980–1986), Rev. S. Alakumalai (1986–1990) and Rev. Steven Abbarow (1990–1998).

The first resident priest to be appointed to All Souls’ Church was Rev. K. Kalaimuthu who was licensed by the late Bishop Tan Sri John G. Savarimuthu on 21 August 1994. He was succeeded by Rev. Dr. Vijendra Daniel in November 1997. On 30 August 1998 the Bishop Tan Sri Datuk Dr. Lim Cheng Ean inaugurated ASC as a Missionary District, with Rev. Dr. Vijendra Daniel serving as the resident priest.

On 1 January 2007, Rev. David Cheong took over from Rev. Dr. Vijendra Daniel as Priest-in-Charge of All Souls’ Church. He was succeeded by Rev. Jeremiah Lee (2008—2011), Rev. Simon Soh (2011—2015) and Rev. James Ming Sabaran (2015—2017). On 1 January 2018, Rev. Steven Raj succeeded Rev. James Ming Sabaran as Priest-in-Charge of All Souls' Church.

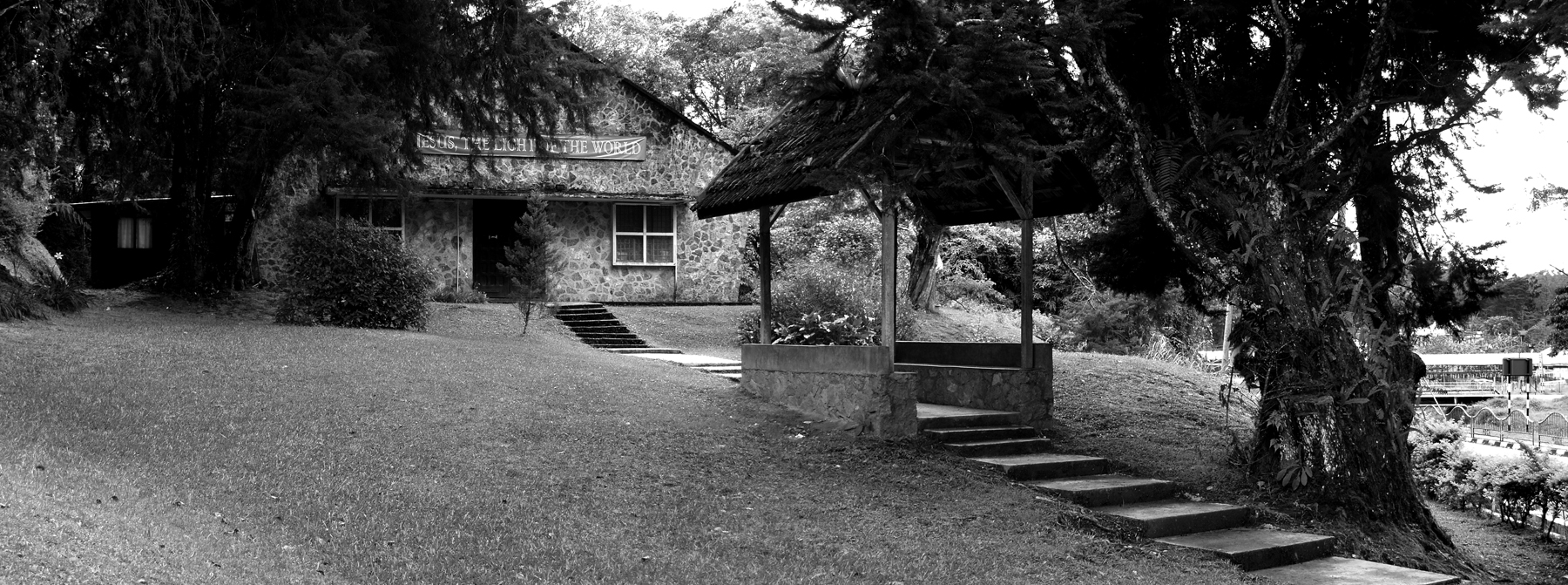
Lawn area of All Souls’ Church (c. 2009).

== Services ==
The church runs four services throughout the week. All services involve lay participation.

The mid-week Holy Communion Service is conducted on Wednesday, the Kg. Telimau Holy Communion Service (Thursday), the Tamil Holy Communion Service (Friday) and the weekend Holy Communion Service (Sunday).

== See also ==
- Anglicanism
- Anglican Communion
- Anne Griffith-Jones
- Bishop of West Malaysia
- Church of the Province of South East Asia
- Christianity in Malaysia
- Diocese of West Malaysia

== News articles ==
- "Perfect English wedding for ex-beauty queen and lawyer". The Star. 25 April 2005.
- "Cameron Highlands: Malaysia's enduring 'Little England'". CNN Travel. 27 June 2013.
