= Federal Detention Center, SeaTac =

U.S. federal prison in Washington state

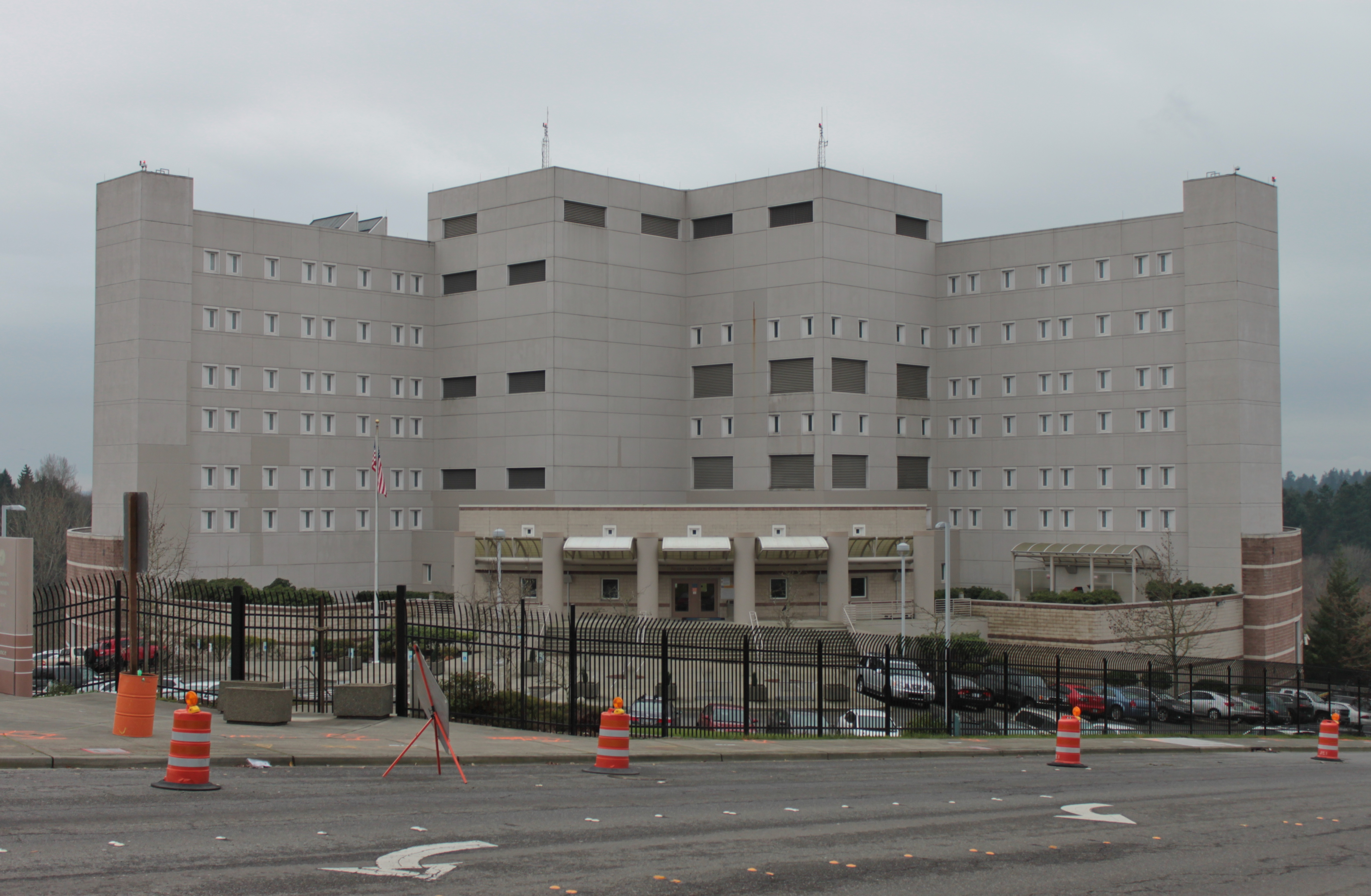
- Interactive map of Federal Detention Center, SeaTac
- Location: 2425 South 200th Street SeaTac, Washington 98198; 47°25′19″N 122°18′06″W
- Status: Operational
- Security class: Administrative
- Capacity: 1000
- Population: 608 (March 23, 2015)
- Opened: September 1997
- Managed by: Federal Bureau of Prisons

The Federal Detention Center, SeaTac (FDC SeaTac) is a federal prison in SeaTac, Washington, near the Seattle–Tacoma International Airport. It is operated by the Federal Bureau of Prisons, a division of the United States Department of Justice. The facility is also adjacent to the Angle Lake light rail station.

The administrative facility employed 200 staff as of 2002 and housed 608 male and female inmates as of March 23, 2015.

== Background ==
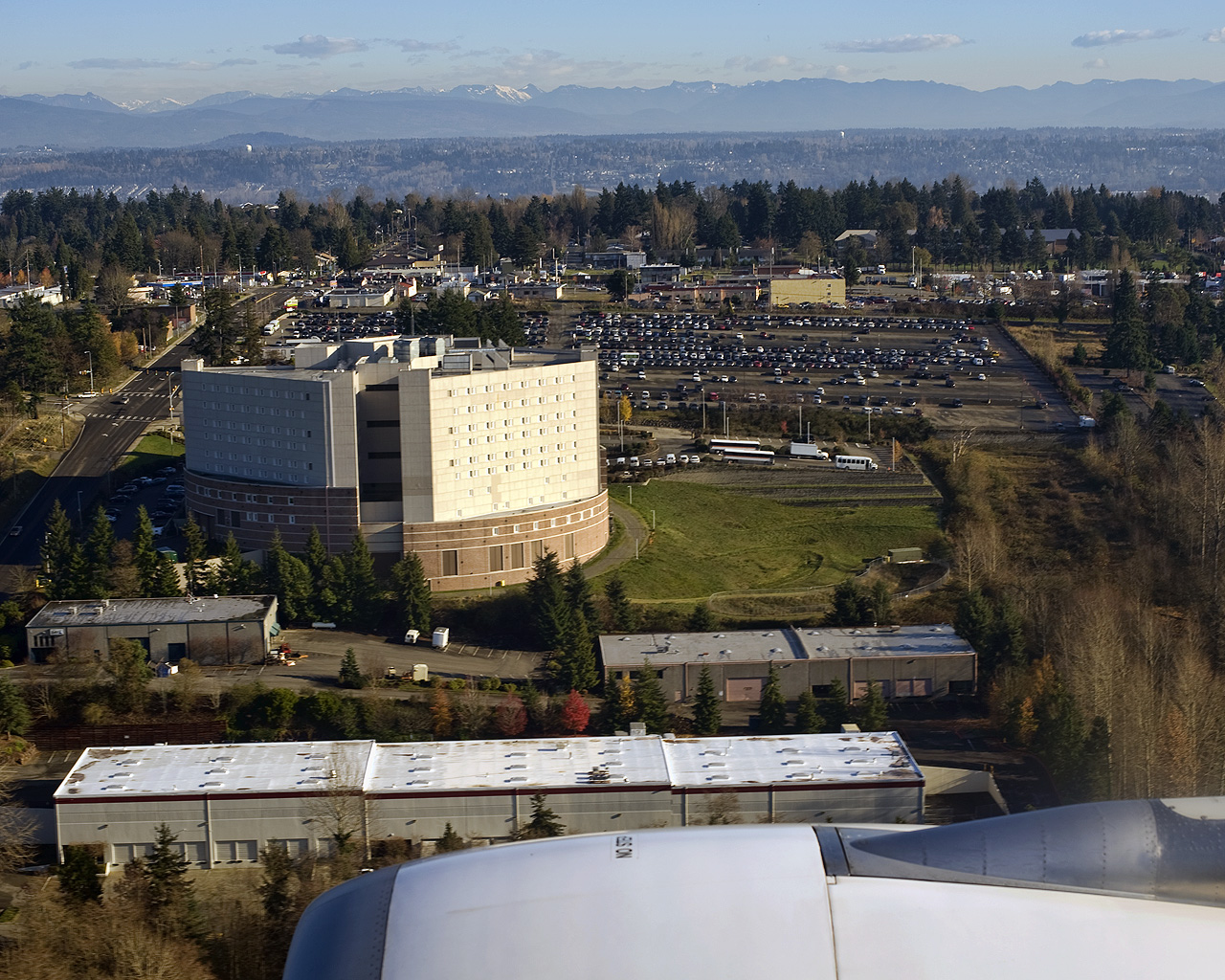
FDC SeaTac

Opened in September 1997, the detention center was designed for a capacity of 1000 inmates. The facility houses sentenced inmates, both male and female, as well as pre-trial, holdover, and immigration detainees. Many are involved in federal court proceedings in the Western District of Washington.

=== Procedures ===
Inmates are issued a "standard bed roll" consisting of bedding and towels upon arrival. Once assigned to a unit, inmates are estimated for size, provided clothes, and issued an identification card that must be carried at all times except to and from showers.

=== Death of Roxanna Brown ===
Roxanna Brown, the director of the Southeast Asian Ceramics Museum, died in a cell at the detention center on May 14, 2008. She had been arrested on May 9 for alleged wire fraud upon her arrival in the United States to give a lecture at an Asian art symposium at the University of Washington. The charge was dropped immediately after her death at the facility.

A medical malpractice lawsuit was filed by her son Taweesin Jaime Ngerntongdee after it was determined that Brown died of peritonitis caused by a perforated ulcer. The suit claimed that she had suffered stomach problems in the detention center and other inmates took her to a shower after a guard did not respond when she vomited something that "smelled like excrement." When Brown called for help after the 10 p.m. lockdown on May 13, the guard told her that she would have to wait until the morning for medical attention, according to the suit. Detention center officials acknowledged that there was no overnight medical staff on duty and took the case to mediation. The federal government settled the case for $880,000 in July 2009. Attorney Tim Ford stated that part of the settlement stipulated that Brown's death would be investigated by the Federal Bureau of Prisons.

=== Prosecutor murder plot ===
The Federal Bureau of Prisons filed a request on June 16, 2009, to transfer Clayton Roueche of the United Nations gang from SeaTac to the U.S. Penitentiary in Marion, Illinois, after the discovery of an alleged plot with fellow inmate Luke Elliott Sommer to kill three federal prosecutors and the warden of the detention center. Roueche was eventually transferred to the U.S. Penitentiary in Lee County, Virginia.

== Notable inmates (current and former) ==
Inmate Name	Register Number	Photo	Status	Details
Colton Harris-Moore	83421-004		Released in September 2016	American criminal and former fugitive nicknamed the "Barefoot Bandit"; pleaded guilty in 2011 to stealing several small planes and a boat, and bank burglary; also committed over 100 home burglaries.
Jim Bell	26906-086		Released on March 12, 2012	Crypto-anarchist
Roxanna Brown	35939-086		Died in cell on May 14, 2008	Alleged wire fraud
Gary Bowser	11017-509		Served 30 months at SeaTac, released on March 28, 2023	Arrested on October 1, 2020, for his participation in the hacking of the Nintendo Switch and sentenced to 40-month term on February 12, 2022. Member of the Team Xecuter group.
Ethan Nordean	28596-509		Released on March 3, 2021; currently at FCI Coleman	Member of the Proud Boys who was arrested for participation in the 2021 United States Capitol attack. Nordean was sentenced to 18 years in prison in 2023.
Marc Emery	40252-086		Released on July 10, 2014	Cannabis advocate
Anthony Curcio	38974-086		Released in April 2013; completed 6-year sentence at USP Coleman	Former college football player and real estate investor, convicted in 2009 for masterminding one of the most elaborate armored car heists in history.
David Sidoo	25452-111		Served a 90-day sentence, released December 17, 2020	Charged with connection to the 2019 college admissions bribery scandal.
Clayton Roueche	36994-177		Transferred to FCI Edgefield	Drug lord; founder of the United Nations gang
Luke Elliott Sommer	38474-086		Transferred to USP Coleman II, Florida	Bank robbery

== See also ==
- Incarceration in the United States
- List of U.S. federal prisons
