= Operation Antiquity =

Operation Antiquity was a criminal investigation by U.S. federal law enforcement agencies to investigate the smuggling of ancient artifacts from Thailand, Vietnam, Myanmar (Burma), Cambodia, Laos, and other countries in Asia and the Americas to the United States. The investigation began in 2002 and concluded officially in 2014. After several years of quiet development and undercover work, the case was made public on January 24, 2008 when federal law enforcement officers raided several museums and two antiquities dealers throughout California and a private museum in Illinois.

The case examined coordinated efforts from individuals who smuggled artifacts from Southeast Asia to the United States, as well as several museums that accessioned donations of suspect origination. Tens of thousands looted cultural relics were seized in this case, many of them from Ban Chiang and related archaeological sites. The case later facilitated the repatriation of some artifacts to Thailand and other countries and resulted in higher standards of museum acquisitions who deal with ancient cultural property.

== Background ==
Initially, the main suspects in the case were Robert Olson and Armand Labbé. Robert Olson started collecting antiquities from North and South America in 1970. Often these antiquities were looted from archaeological sites and then smuggled from their countries by middle men or himself, allegedly. In some cases, he would then sell these artifacts to museums across California for a profit. Labbé was the curator at the Bowers Museum but died before the raids took place. The Bowers Museum was one of those raided for possessing smuggled artifacts. Labbé had Marc Pettibone, an American living in Thailand and alleged coconspirator of Olson, collect ancient artifacts from Thailand, and assist in bribing Thai customs for the smooth transportation of artifacts across borders. Olson's customers also included Beverly Hills home improvement stores and private art galleries such as the Silk Roads Gallery. After smuggling ancient artifacts into the United States, art galleries found people who needed tax deductions and provided appraisers' services, inflating the price of artifacts obtained from Thailand as the appraised value. Individuals would then donate them to museums to receive a tax deduction for art donations. It was deemed that there are more cultural relics from Thailand in American museums than in excavationed collections.

Silk Roads Gallery was run by Jonathan and Carolyn Markell and was one of the raided businesses. The Markells and Olson were singled out in the investigation due to their numerous ties to the smuggled artifacts in circulation. They were involved in the inflated appraisal values of many artifacts, some inflated as much as 400 times the commercial value, and were believed to have personally coached individuals to donate these items. Most donation assessments remained under the sum of $5000 each to avoid further documentation required by the IRS.

== Investigation and Raids ==
The IRS and various other Federal Law Enforcement agencies began to pay attention to this pattern of criminal activity in 2002, launching a federal investigation code-named "Operation Antiquity". Todd Swain, a National Park Service agent, went undercover as a private collector, referred to as Tom Hoyt. His operation entailed buying smuggled artifacts from Robert Olson and the Markells and donating them to museums with the supposed intent to write them off on his taxes. Through this operation, agents discovered that the directors of these museums had some level of knowledge about the suspicious origins of the ancient artifacts (or at the least that their origins were dubious), and agreed to accept donations anyway. While many of the museums ultimately cooperated with federal agents, they continued to protest that all artifacts in their possession were legitimately acquired. Personnel and informants later stated that obtainment of many artifacts and art pieces was not thoroughly investigated. At the time of the raids, the director of the Bowers museum, Peter Keller, stated he had done nothing criminal, however appraisals done by late Bowers curator Armand Labbé's girlfriend during Keller's employment raised questions. Labbé was a known associate of Robert Olson and is admitted to have accepted smuggled or dubiously obtained artifacts prior.

The case was made public on January 24, 2008, when 500 federal law enforcement officers raided multiple museums, shops, warehouses and homes of private art collectors in California and Illinois. The investigation revealed thousands of ancient artifacts from Ban Chiang and other prehistoric sites in Thailand that were in the collections of several California museums, including the Los Angeles County Museum of Art, Pacific Asia Museum, Bowers Museum, and the Mingei International Museum.

On the same day as the raids in California, the private museum of a trustee of the Art Institute of Chicago, Barry MacLean, was served a search warrant by federal agents. The raid at MacLean's property revealed the extensive reach of this illegal artifact trade. Through the investigation, it was determined that many of Barry MacLean's artifacts had been procured with the help of Robert Olson. This was confirmed by Olson who alleged that MacLean was one of his top clients, spending between $50,000 to $100,000 a year during their eight to ten year business relationship.

Beginning in 2005, Dr. Joyce White assisted the U.S. government as an expert witness in identifying more than 10,000 artifacts of Southeast Asian origin, including copper-base adzes, copper-base bangles, glass and stone beads, clay rollers, and pottery vessels . As a leading expert on Northeast Thai archaeology, she was brought in to assess the authenticity of many artifacts and later to testify to the irreparable damage looting cultural objects causes. One of the main sites in which artifacts were looted from was the UNESCO World Heritage Site, Ban Chiang. In a subsequent study, Joyce White and her co-authors presented a methodology for quantifying the archaeological damage represented by the seized objects was presented through calculation of archaeological value (AV). The study calculated the rates of recovery of marketable object recovered from actual archaeological excavation, namely at Ban Chiang, and combined that data with the cost of excavations to calculate the AV for individual seized objects in Operation Antiquity. The assessment estimated that the AV of the stone beads alone was US$22 billion and the 444 recovered copper-base adzes were assigned an estimated AV of US$3.2 billion. This assessment illustrates that the "commercial value" commonly associated with objects in illicit trafficking of looted materials fails to include the extent of damage incurred by the archaeological record, which often represents much greater monetary value.

== Outcomes ==
Robert Olsen was arraigned in 2013 but pleaded not guilty. The trial was expected to take place in November 2016, but Olson's ill health delayed it several times before his plea was withdrawn following his death in May 2017. Roxanna Brown, director of the Southeast Asian Ceramics Museum at Bangkok University, originally assisted the prosecution in investigating the case, but when the prosecution later found out that Brown and Olsen had a close relationship and had emails exchanged between the two parties, her position was switched from witness to suspect. One case of these suspicious handlings was when Brown allowed Olson to use her electronic signature as proof of the valuation of museum donation, and Olson promised to pay Brown an honorarium. Brown was arrested in Seattle on May 9, 2008, but died in the detention center five days later. Roxanna Brown's family won a civil suit against the federal government for her death. Mark Pettibone was indicted by U.S. prosecutors in 2012, but could not be extradited to the U.S. for trial.

In contrast to the high-profile search operation in January 2008, the prosecution's investigation stagnated in the following years, and very few of the suspected collectors, curators, smugglers, etc. were prosecuted. However, the case still has yielded partial results. Jonathan and Carolyn Markell, the owners of Silk Roads Gallery, pleaded guilty to the charges in 2015. Jonathan was sentenced to 18 months in prison and one year of supervised probation for trafficking in looted antiquities and forged documents; Jonathan and Carrie were each sentenced to three years of unsupervised probation. Additionally, they also had to pay a flat fine of about $2,000 and for the expenses of shipping the over 300 artifacts seized from their homes and galleries back to Southeast Asia, totaling about $25,000.

== Return ==
Some museums found to be holding smuggled artifacts have returned at least some of them to Thailand: in October 2014, the Bowers Museum returned 542 artifacts to Thailand, and Mingei International Museum returned 67 artifacts. The returning of the artifacts was part of deals made with the Los Angeles US Attorney's Office where museums would avoid prosecution if they cooperated with the case and repatriation efforts. The Bangkok Post reported that, thanks to the hard work of the Thai and American authorities, the ancient relics looted from archaeological sites have been returned, and the Thai government welcomes the repatriation of these relics. This case is of great significance in the United States, mainly for two reasons: first, this investigation was initiated by the U.S. federal government, and not by a complaint from a foreign government, and second, the US government's interest in the crimes set a higher standard of accountability for museum officials who deal with ancient cultural property.
