= Murder of Mackenzie Cowell =

2010 child murder in Wenatchee, Washington, US

Mackenzie Cowell
- Born: Mackenzie Nicole Cowell; April 1, 1992
- Disappeared: February 9, 2010; Wenatchee, Washington, United States
- Died: February 9, 2010 (aged 17)
- Cause of death: Homicide by strangulation and stabbing
- Body discovered: Crescent Bar, Washington, United States
- Resting place: Wenatchee City Cemetery
- Occupation: Student

Mackenzie Nicole Cowell (April 1, 1992 – February 9, 2010) was a 17-year-old American youth who went missing and was murdered in February 2010. She was last seen at the beauty school she attended in Wenatchee, Washington. Her body was discovered on the banks of the Columbia River four days later on February 13, 2010. A post-mortem examination determined she had been strangled, stabbed in the neck, and had suffered blunt force trauma to the head.

After an extensive investigation, police implicated 29-year-old Christopher Scott Wilson— a beauty school classmate of Cowell's— in her death. Police began to suspect Wilson after several people came forward claiming that he had a fascination with death and serial killers. Wilson was arrested after DNA evidence linked him to the crime scene. Police later found Cowell's blood in his apartment.

In a plea agreement, Wilson pleaded guilty to manslaughter and was sentenced to just over 14 years in prison. Wilson later attempted to withdraw his guilty plea, stating that he only accepted the plea agreement because he felt he would not have received a fair trial. He was freed from Monroe Correctional Center on December 11, 2023.

== Background and disappearance ==
Mackenzie Cowell was 17 years old at the time of her disappearance. She lived in Orondo, Washington and was a senior at Wenatchee High School, where she was a member of the school dance team. She also worked as a model and studied cosmetology at the Wenatchee Academy of Hair Design in downtown Wenatchee.

Cowell went missing shortly after 3:00 p.m. on February 9, 2010. She was last seen on surveillance video leaving the Academy of Hair Design, walking to her car and driving away. She had told classmates that she would be back in less than 15 minutes. Around this time, she sent a text message to her boyfriend that said, "Hey, what's up". This was the last time she is known to have used her phone.

Cowell's father attempted to contact her at around 5:40 p.m., but his calls went straight to voicemail. Her family became increasingly concerned after she missed her 8 p.m. curfew. Later that night, a homeowner in remote Chelan County reported an abandoned car near his driveway. Police traced the car's registration to Cowell's father, who informed them Cowell was missing. The car was located near Mission Ridge, about 40 miles (64 km) from her home in Orondo. Cowell's purse and some clothes were found in the car, although her debit card and cell phone were missing. According to police, only one pair of footprints was found at the scene.

The Chelan County Sheriff's Office began the investigation into Cowell's disappearance by using a helicopter to search the area near where her car was found. Search warrants were issued for Cowell's phone records and social media activity. At the request of the sheriff, the FBI was called in to assist with the investigation.

== Discovery of body and autopsy ==
On the afternoon of February 13, Cowell's body was discovered by a passer-by on the banks of the Columbia River near Quincy, Washington, at a resort community about 20 miles (32 km) away from Wenatchee. She was found fully clothed, with her feet in the water. Her body was found approximately 50 yards (46 m) from a vacant house that was for sale.

An autopsy determined the cause of death had been strangulation and stab wounds to the neck. Cowell also suffered blunt force trauma to the head. The killer had apparently attempted to cut off one of her arms after her death. A knife was found, still stuck into her shoulder. Investigators found no evidence that Cowell had been sexually assaulted.

On February 25, around 1,800 people attended a memorial service for Cowell, which was held at the Town Toyota Center in Wenatchee.

== Investigation ==
The investigation was headed by the Mackenzie Cowell Task Force, a multi-agency police group assembled after the recovery of Cowell's body. The task force included law enforcement agents from the cities of Wenatchee and East Wenatchee, and from the counties of Chelan and Douglas. An FBI agent and two officials from U.S. Immigration and Customs Enforcement also assisted the task force. The case was the largest multi-agency investigation in the Wenatchee area since an attempted serial bombing in 1997. Police interviewed over 800 people throughout the course of the investigation.

Police initially looked into Cowell's boyfriend, Joaquin Villasano, as well as her mother's boyfriend, Joey Fisher. According to police, Villasano had failed a polygraph when asked if he knew what happened to Cowell. Fisher had allegedly gotten into an argument with Cowell the day before she went missing. However, both Villasano and Fisher were later completely cleared by police.

The next lead in the case came from Liz Reid, a college student, police informant and former drug dealer. Reid told police that two men, Sam Cuevas and Emmanuel Cerros, had murdered Cowell in a case of mistaken identity. The two had supposedly believed Cowell was an informant. Reid claims she saw a snuff film of the murder, and that Cuevas admitted to her: "'I choked that bitch to shut her up".

Reid was able to describe the murder weapon before it was made public, and gave police a ring which she claimed had belonged to Cowell. She said Cerros had sent her to the murder site to find the ring. None of Cowell's family members recognized the ring as belonging to Mackenzie. Reid later retracted her claim of seeing a video of the murder. As a result, police began to question Reid's credibility. Cuevas and Cerros were interviewed by police and produced alibis, witness statements and phone records placing them elsewhere on the day of Cowell's disappearance.

=== Christopher Scott Wilson ===
After receiving several tips, police began to focus the investigation on Christopher Scott Wilson, a 29-year-old classmate of Cowell's at the Academy of Hair Design. Police received a letter in August which claimed that Wilson had an "obsession with death, dead bodies and serial killers." One of Wilson's classmates told police that Wilson had said he used to work in funeral homes and that he "liked to cut people up".

On October 6, Wilson was arrested on suspicion of second-degree murder and held on US$1 million (equivalent to $1.6 million in 2025) bail. DNA found on duct tape near where Cowell's body was discovered linked Wilson to the crime. According to investigators, Wilson left the beauty school shortly after Cowell did on the day she disappeared. Three witnesses reported seeing a man matching Wilson's description near where her car had been abandoned. A search of Wilson's apartment revealed the presence of blood which matched Cowell's DNA.

In December, the Cowell task force made a second arrest. Wilson's friend Tessa M. Schuyleman was accused of— but never charged with— helping Wilson to conceal the crime. She was instead charged with obstruction of justice for an unrelated case. Detectives claimed that many photos were found on Wilson's computer of Schuyleman "posing as a dead person" on the spot in Wilson's apartment where Cowell's blood was found. Schuyleman claims she had no knowledge of the blood stain and that Wilson had told her to pose there.

== Court proceedings and aftermath ==
Prosecutors upgraded Wilson's charge from second-degree to first-degree murder in April 2011, stating that his actions constituted premeditation. If convicted, he faced a sentence of 20 to 26 years in prison. Before the trial began, Wilson rejected a plea deal in which he would have received a prison sentence of about six and a half years in exchange for pleading guilty to first-degree manslaughter.

Wilson's defense team was led by John Henry Browne, a prominent Seattle attorney who had previously represented high-profile defendants such as Ted Bundy and Colton Harris Moore. Browne intended to argue that Cowell's blood had been planted in Wilson's apartment. According to Browne, more blood should have been found at the apartment, given the violent nature of Cowell's death. The presiding judge ruled that the defense would be allowed to present evidence implicating Cuevas and Cerros as the killers. The judge also ruled that the prosecution would not be allowed to bring up Wilson's work history at area funeral homes, his tattoo of Hannibal Lecter, or his online activity on DeviantArt and on serial killer forums.

After jury selection for the trial had begun, Wilson accepted a new plea deal. He pleaded guilty to the first-degree manslaughter of Mackenzie Cowell, as well as first-degree robbery for taking her cell phone and second-degree assault for an unrelated case. He was sentenced to 14 years and 3 months in prison. Wilson would later maintain his innocence, stating that he only pleaded guilty because he did not believe he would receive a fair trial. According to Wilson, around 80% of juror candidates answered questionnaires stating either that they believed Wilson was guilty or that they had knowledge of evidence which was ordered to be suppressed at trial.

Wilson later filed a motion to withdraw his guilty plea, but the motion was rejected by the Washington Court of Appeals.

Wilson was freed from Monroe Correctional Center on December 11, 2023.

== See also ==
- List of murdered American children
- List of solved missing person cases (post-2000)
