= Tam Pa Ling Cave =

Cave in Laos with archaic human fossils

- Cave of the Monkeys
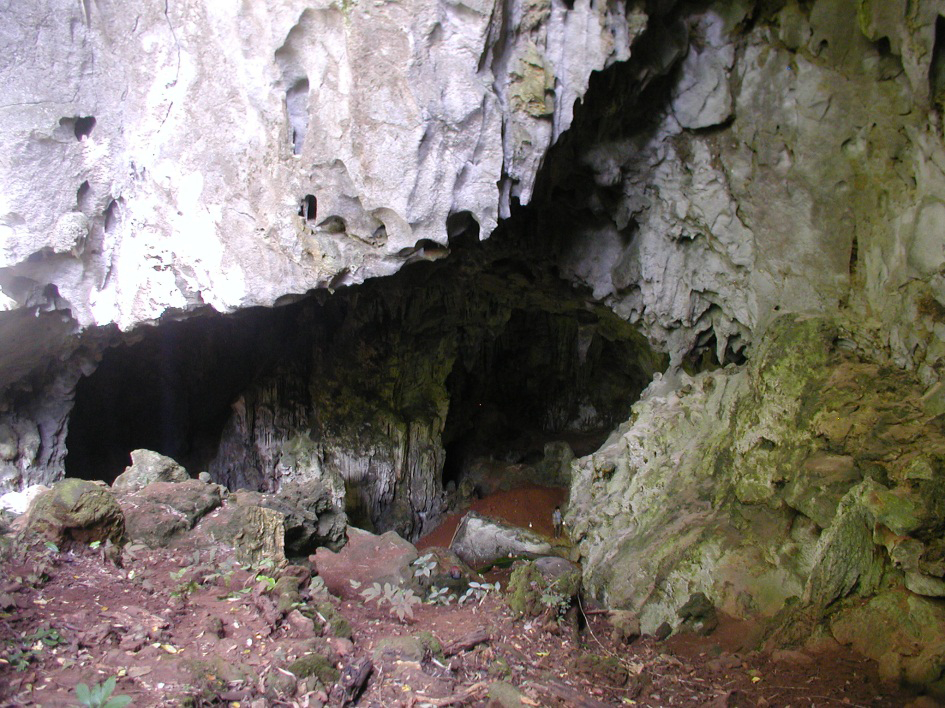
- South entrance to the cave

- location in Laos
- 20°12′31″N 103°24′35″E
- Type: Cave
- Periods: Upper Paleolithic, Middle Paleolithic
- Associated with: Paleo-humans
- Location: Houaphanh Province, northern Laos 260 km (160 mi) NNE of Vientiane
- Region: Annamite Mountains
- Part of: Pa Hang Mountain

Site notes
- Material: limestone, karst
- Elevation: 1,170 m (3,840 ft)
- Length: 40 m (130 ft)
- Width: 30 m (98 ft)
- Excavation dates: 2008-ongoing
- Archaeologists: Fabrice Demeter, Laura Shackleford

Tam Pa Ling (Lao: ຖ້ຳຜາລິງ, Cave of the Monkeys) is a cave in the Annamite Mountains in north-eastern Laos. It is situated at the top of Pa Hang Mountain, 1,170 m (3,840 ft) above sea level.

Three hominin fossils have been discovered in the cave: TPL1, a skull belonging to an anatomically modern human; TPL2, a mandible with both modern and archaic traits; and TPL3, a partial mandible with both modern and archaic traits. The three fossils represent three separate individuals and date from around 70,000 to 46,000 years old. The discoveries indicate that modern humans may have migrated to Southeast Asia by 60,000 BP.

== Location and geology ==
Tam Pa Ling has a single, south-facing opening and descends 65 m (213 ft) to its main gallery. It is part of a network of karst caves, formed by the dissolution of limestone beds that were laid down between the Upper Carboniferous and Permian periods. The main gallery measures 30 m (98 ft) from north to south and 40 m (130 ft) from east to west.

== Fossils ==
Excavations at the eastern end of the cave's main gallery, at the base of the sloped entrance, were conducted by a team of American, French and Laotian researchers starting in 2009.

The first fossil find, a hominin skull dubbed TPL1, was recovered at a depth of 2.35 m (7 ft 9 in) in December 2009. A mandible, TPL2, was found the following year at a depth of 2.65 m (8 ft 8 in). Radiocarbon and luminescence dating of the sediments established a minimum age of 51,000 to 46,000 years, and direct uranium-thorium dating of the fossils indicated a maximum age of 63,000 years.

TPL1 includes the frontal, partial occipital, right parietal, and temporal bone, as well as the right and left maxillae and a largely complete dentition. It was identified as belonging to an anatomically modern human with distinct Sub-Saharan African features. As of 2017, it provides the earliest skeletal evidence for the presence of Homo sapiens in mainland Southeast Asia.

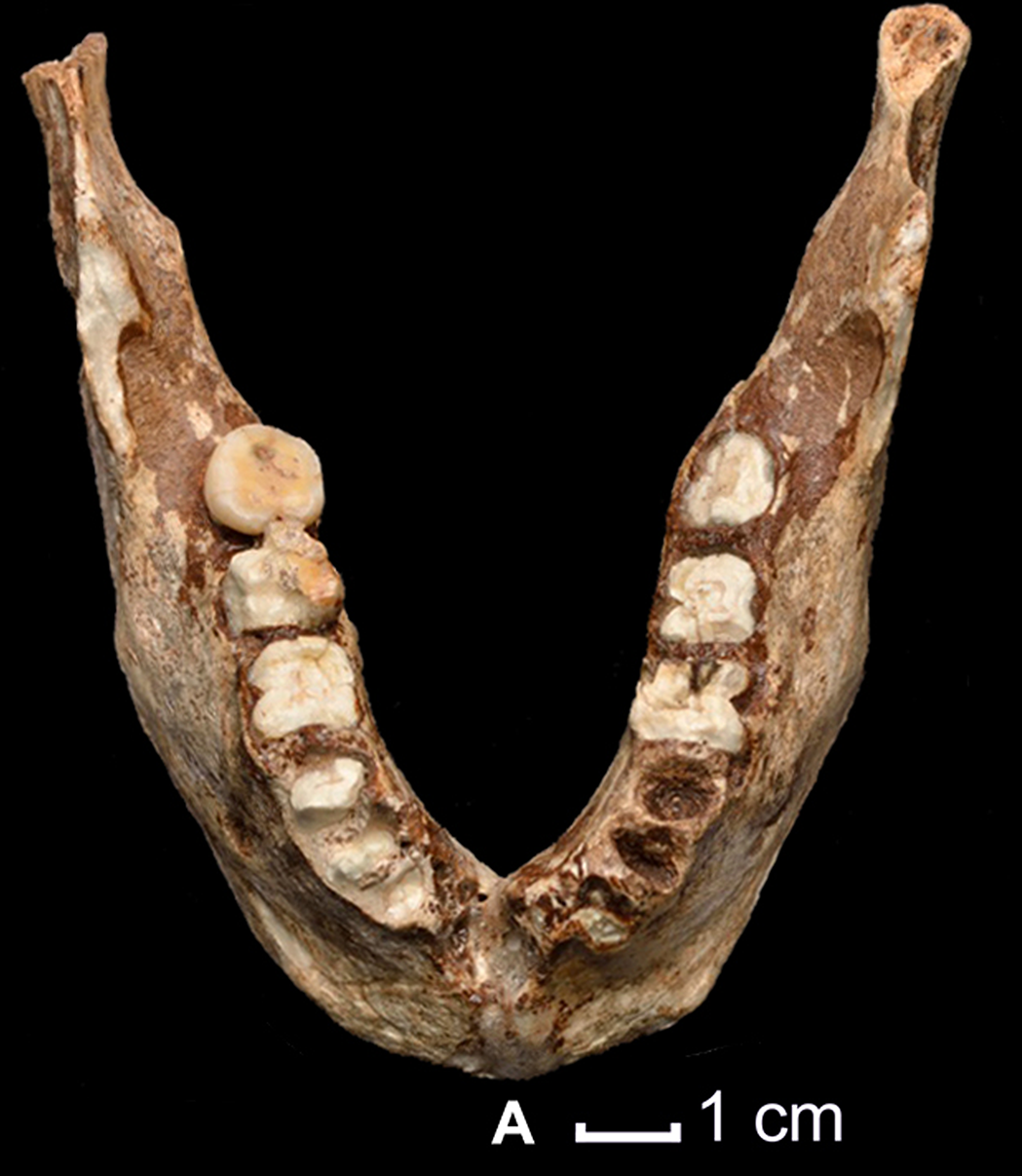
TPL2 mandible

The TPL2 mandible was found lower down in the same stratigraphic unit as TPL1, and represents a mature adult that combines archaic human features such as a robust mandibular corpus and small overall size, with modern human traits like a developed chin.

In 2013, researchers recovered the partial mandible of a third fossil find, TPL3, at a depth of 5.0 m (16.4 ft), from the same area as the previous finds. The bone fragment likely belonged to an adult. Like TPL2, TPL3 exhibits a mix of archaic and anatomically modern human traits, exhibiting modern human features such as having a developed chin but not having a robust mandibular corpus; however, TPL3 also retains archaic human features such as having a broad anterior mandibular arch. Luminescence dating of the TPL3 sediment layer provides a date range from around 70,000 to 48,000 years old.

=== Significance ===
The timing of modern human migration from Africa to East Asia is not known with certainty; because bone is poorly preserved in tropical climates, human fossils from the region are rare. Recent discoveries in China, the Philippines, Sri Lanka and Australia had previously established that archaic human fossils were present between 125,000 and 100,000 BP, and those of modern humans from about 40,000 BP. The discovery of the fully modern TPL1 specimen was therefore considered a major discovery because it filled in a 60,000-year gap in the fossil record, demonstrating the presence of modern humans in Southeast Asia from at least 60,000 BP. Additionally, as Tam Pa Ling lies a thousand miles inland, the finds challenged previous assumptions that humans migrated out of Africa by following coastlines. They suggest that the migration may also have proceeded along river valleys, which served as natural corridors through the continent.

The fossils were temporarily removed to the United States for study by paleoanthropologist Laura Shackleford, Fabrice Demeter and the team. In April 2016 they were returned to Laos, and are now housed in a new building of the Lao National Museum in Vientiane.

== See also ==
- Tham An Mah
- Laang Spean
- Peopling of Southeast Asia
