= Ban Chiang =

Archaeological site in Udon Thani province, Thailand

Ban Chiang Archaeological Site
UNESCO World Heritage Site
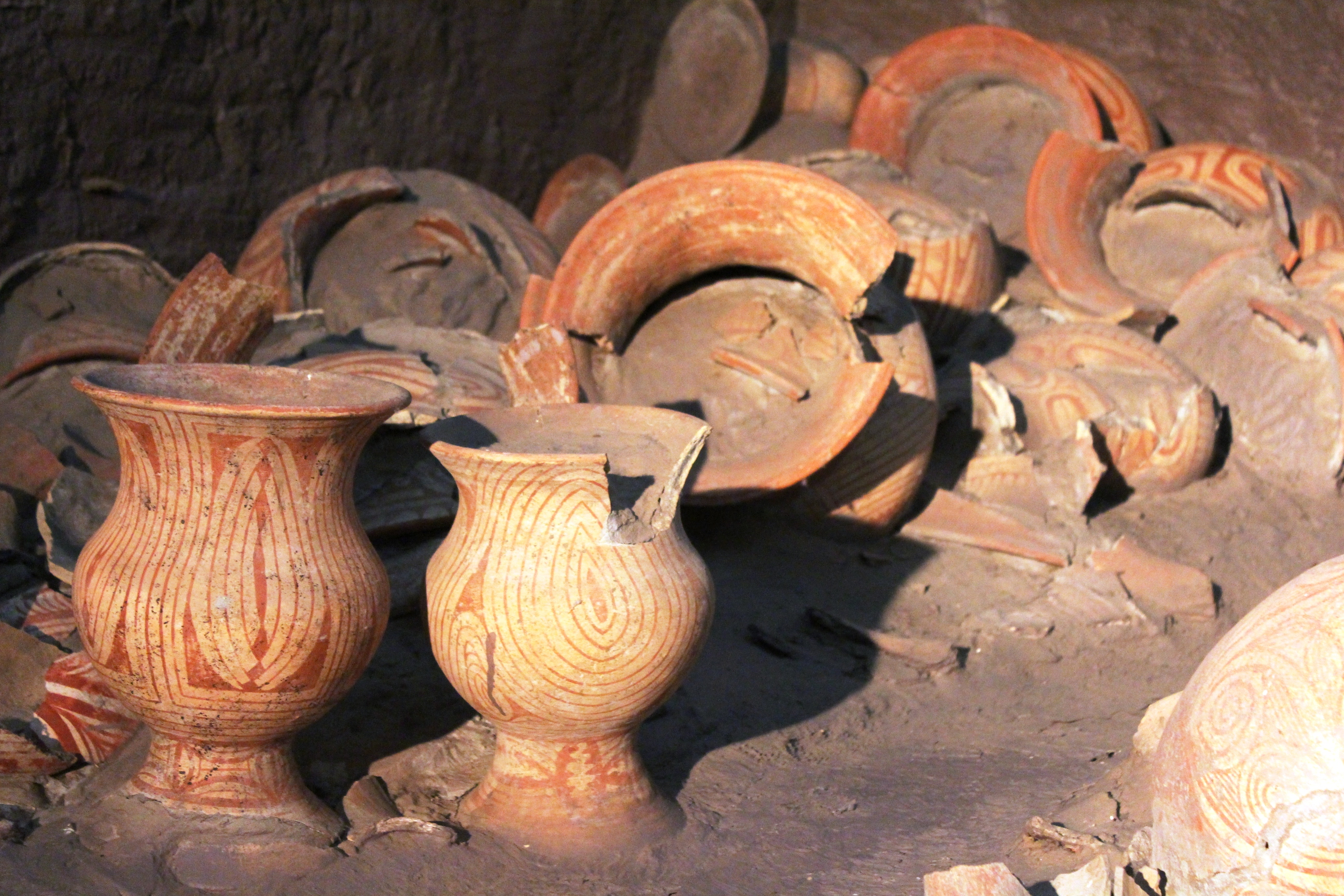

- Location within Thailand
- Location: Nong Han district, Udon Thani province, Thailand
- Criteria: Cultural: iii
- Reference: 575
- Inscription: 1992 (16th Session)
- Area: 30 ha (74 acres)
- Buffer zone: 760 ha (1,900 acres)
- Coordinates: 17°24′25″N 103°14′29″E

Ban Chiang (Thai: บ้านเชียง, pronounced [bâːn tɕʰīaŋ]; Northeastern Thai: บ้านเซียง, pronounced [bâːn sîaŋ]) is an archaeological site in Nong Han district, Udon Thani province, Thailand. It has been a UNESCO World Heritage Site since 1992. Discovered in 1966, the site first attracted interest due to its ancient red-painted pottery. Furthermore, Ban Chiang is a significant site known for its archaeological evidence of early agriculture and its strong influence of culture depicted through artwork specifically seen in the red-painted pottery. Ban Chiang’s long history of site history and metal craftsmanship shows the biological and cultural changes over time and their influences on the community. More recently, it gained international attention in 2008 when the United States Department of Justice, following an undercover investigation begun in 2003, raided several museums for their role in trafficking in Ban Chiang antiquities.

== Discovery ==
Villagers had uncovered some of the pottery in prior years without insight into their age or historical importance. In August 1966, Steve Young, a political science student at Harvard College, was living in the village conducting interviews for his senior honors thesis. Young, a speaker of Thai, was familiar with the work of Wilhelm Solheim and his theory of the possible ancient origins of civilization in Southeast Asia. One day while walking down a path in Ban Chiang with his assistant, an art teacher at the village school, Young tripped over the root of a red kapok tree (Bombax ceiba) and fell on his face in the dirt path. Under him were the exposed tops of small and medium-sized pottery jars. Young recognized that the unglazed earthenware pots had been low-fired and were quite old, but that the designs applied to the surface of the vessels were unique. He took samples of pots to Princess Phanthip Chumbote at the private museum of Suan Pakkad Palace in Bangkok and to Chin Yu Di of the Thai Government's Fine Arts Department. Later, Elisabeth Lyons, an art historian on the staff of the Ford Foundation, sent potsherds from Ban Chiang to the University of Pennsylvania for dating. Unfortunately, the early publicity, the beauty of the pots, and the belief that the pots were several thousands of years old led to avid collecting and consequent avid looting by the villagers.

== Archaeology ==
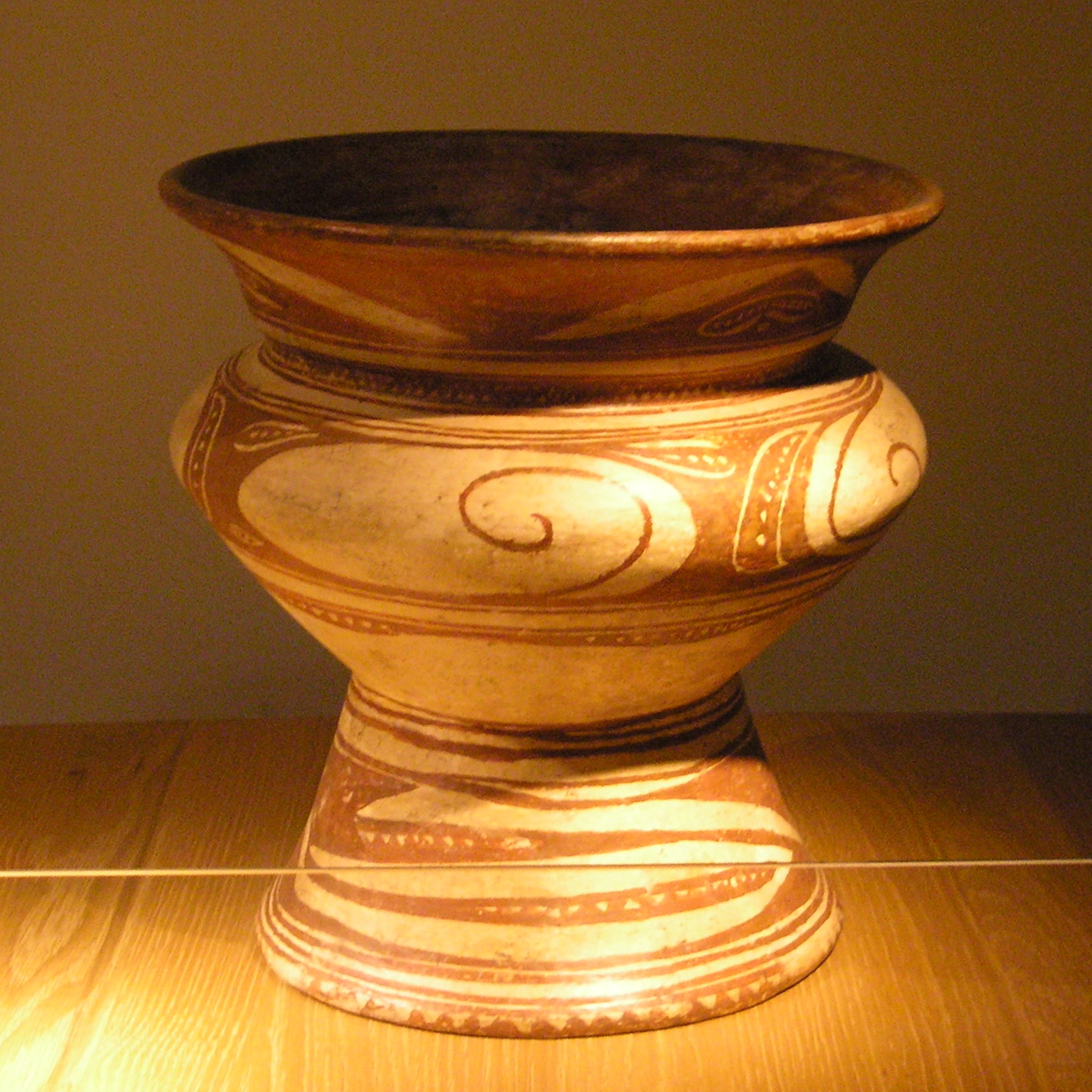
Bowl; from Ban Chiang site; painted ceramic; height: 32 cm, diameter: 31 cm

The Fine Arts Department of Thailand conducted several small excavations during the 1960s and early 1970s. These excavations revealed skeletons, bronze artifacts and a wealth of pots. Rice fragments were also found, leading to the belief that the Bronze Age settlers were probably farmers. The site's oldest graves do not include bronze artifacts and are therefore from a Neolithic culture; the most recent graves date to the Iron Age.

=== The 1974-1975 excavations ===
The first intensive excavation of Ban Chiang was a joint effort by the University of Pennsylvania Museum and the Thai Department of Fine Arts, with co-directors Chester Gorman and Pisit Charoenwongsa. The aim was not only to investigate the site but to train Thai and western archaeologists in the latest techniques. Because of the looting, they had difficulty finding undisturbed areas to excavate, but settled on two areas 100 meters apart. The locales proved to be far richer in finds than expected, and the distinctive red-on-buff pottery that had excited so much interest proved to be quite late (300 B.C.– AD 200), with many levels of equally noteworthy pottery and other cultural remains beneath them. More exciting, the excavations uncovered crucibles and other evidence of metal working, showing that the villagers of Ban Chiang from an early stage manufactured their own metal artifacts rather than simply importing them from elsewhere. Recovered bronze objects include bracelets, rings, anklets, wires and rods, spearheads, axes and adzes, hooks, blades, and little bells. After the two seasons of excavation, six tons of pottery, stone, and metal artifacts were shipped to the University of Pennsylvania Museum for analysis. The early death of Chet Gorman in 1981, at the age of 43, slowed the process of analysis and publication.

This site has often been called a "cemetery site", but research has suggested that the deceased were buried next to or beneath dwellings. This practice is called residential burial.

=== Lifestyle as revealed by human remains ===
At least 142 discrete burials were found in the 1974-1975 excavations. Analysis of the human remains by Michael Pietrusewsky and Michele Toomay Douglas revealed that the people lived a vigorous and active lifestyle with little evidence of interpersonal violence or any form of warfare. The subsistence was based on mixed agricultural/hunting/gathering economy, co-occurring with metallurgy. The conclusion that the centuries-long occupation of the site was largely peaceful is bolstered by the lack of metal weapons.

== Dating the artifacts ==
The excavation at Ban Chiang in 1974–1975 was followed by an article by Chester Gorman and Pisit Charoenwongsa, claiming evidence for the earliest dates in the world for bronze casting and iron working. Subsequent excavations, including that at Ban Non Wat, have now shown that the proposed early dates for Ban Chiang are unlikely. The first datings of the artifacts used the thermoluminescence technique, resulting in a range from 4420–3400 BCE, which would have made the site the earliest Bronze Age culture in the world. These dates stirred world-wide interest. Thermoluminescence dating of pottery was at the time an experimental technique and had been applied to Ban Chiang sherds of uncertain provenance. However, with the 1974–1975 excavation, sufficient material became available for radiocarbon dating. Reanalysis by radiocarbon dating suggested that a more likely date for the earliest metallurgy at Ban Chiang was c. 2000–1700 BCE. A date of 2100 BCE was obtained from rice phytoliths taken from inside a grave vessel of the lowest grave, which had no metal remains. The youngest grave was about 200 CE. Bronze making began circa 2000 BCE, as evidenced by crucibles and bronze fragments. A contrasting analysis was conducted by Charles Higham of the University of Otago using the bones from the people who lived at Ban Chiang and the bones of animals interred with them. The resulting determinations were analyzed using Bayesian statistics and the results suggested that the initial settlement of Ban Chiang took place about 1500 BCE, with the transition to the Bronze Age about 1000 BCE. The chronology of Ban Chiang metallurgy is still in considerable dispute.

== Metallurgy ==
Ban Chiang, along with other surrounding villages in northeast Thailand, contains many bronze artifacts that demonstrate that metallurgy had been practiced in small, village settings nearly four thousand years ago. Bronze artifacts represent culture, art, and diversity and allows researchers to better interpret early ways of life.This is of interest to archaeologists, as ancient Southeast Asian metallurgy flourished without the presence of a militaristic or urbanized state, unlike many other ancient societies that had mastered metallurgy.

Dr Joyce White and Elizabeth Hamilton co-authored a four-volume Ban Chiang metals monograph, the most extensive of its kind in Ban Chiang scholarship. The work presents metals and related evidence from the site as well as three other sites in northeast Thailand: Ban Tong, Ban Phak Top, and Don Klang. It is the second installment in the Thai Archaeology Monograph Series, published by the University of Pennsylvania Press and distributed for the University of Pennsylvania Museum of Archaeology and Anthropology.

In the monograph, White and Hamilton catalogue and classify metal artifacts as well as contribute to the Ban Chiang chronology discourse. They analyzed the metals comprehensively through innovative technological perspectives in order to understand ancient metals in their social contexts. To do this, they make systematic assessments by typological range, variation in metal composition and manufacturing techniques, evidence for on-site production activities, and contextual evidence for deposition of metal finds. White and Hamilton also write that regional variation in metalworker know-how and choices can reveal past networks of communities of metallurgical practice that could have important ramifications for economic and social networks of the time as well as how those changed over time. One of their major findings is that most copper alloy products were cast in local villages and not at large centralized workshops.

White, a leading scholar on Ban Chiang, directs an organization, the Institute of Southeast Asian Archaeology (ISEAA), that manages the Ban Chiang Project at the University of Pennsylvania Museum. The project runs an open access metals database that presents the data on metal and metal-related artifacts found at Ban Chiang and surrounding sites. The metal artifacts are classified into nine groups: bangles, adzes/tillers, blades, points, bells, wires/rods, flat, amorphous, and miscellaneous. The three metal-related groups are crucibles, molds, and slag. The metals database also records the time period in which the artifacts were created and the technical analyses performed on each artifact.

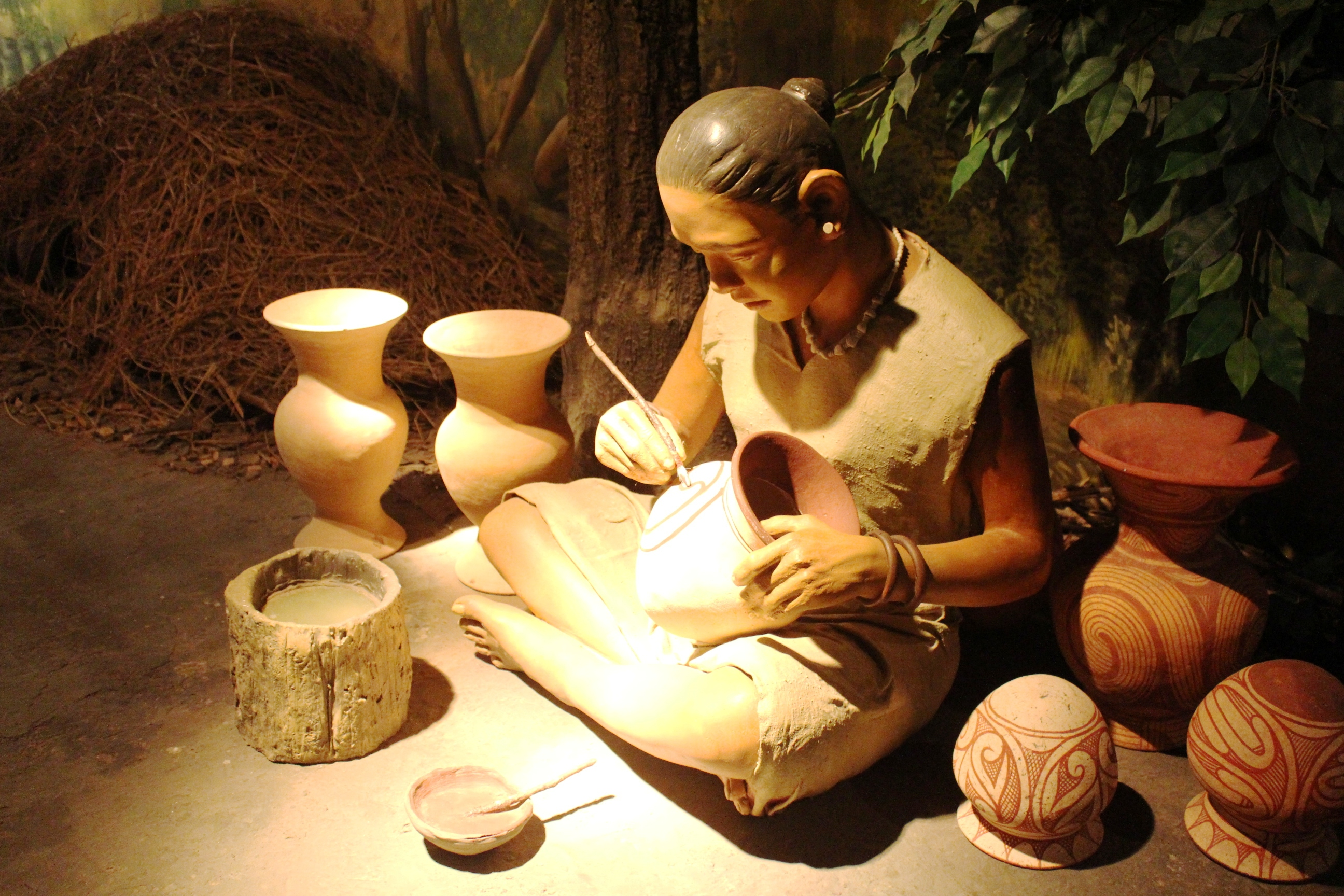
A diorama of an ancient Ban Chiang lady painting pots, Ban Chiang National Museum

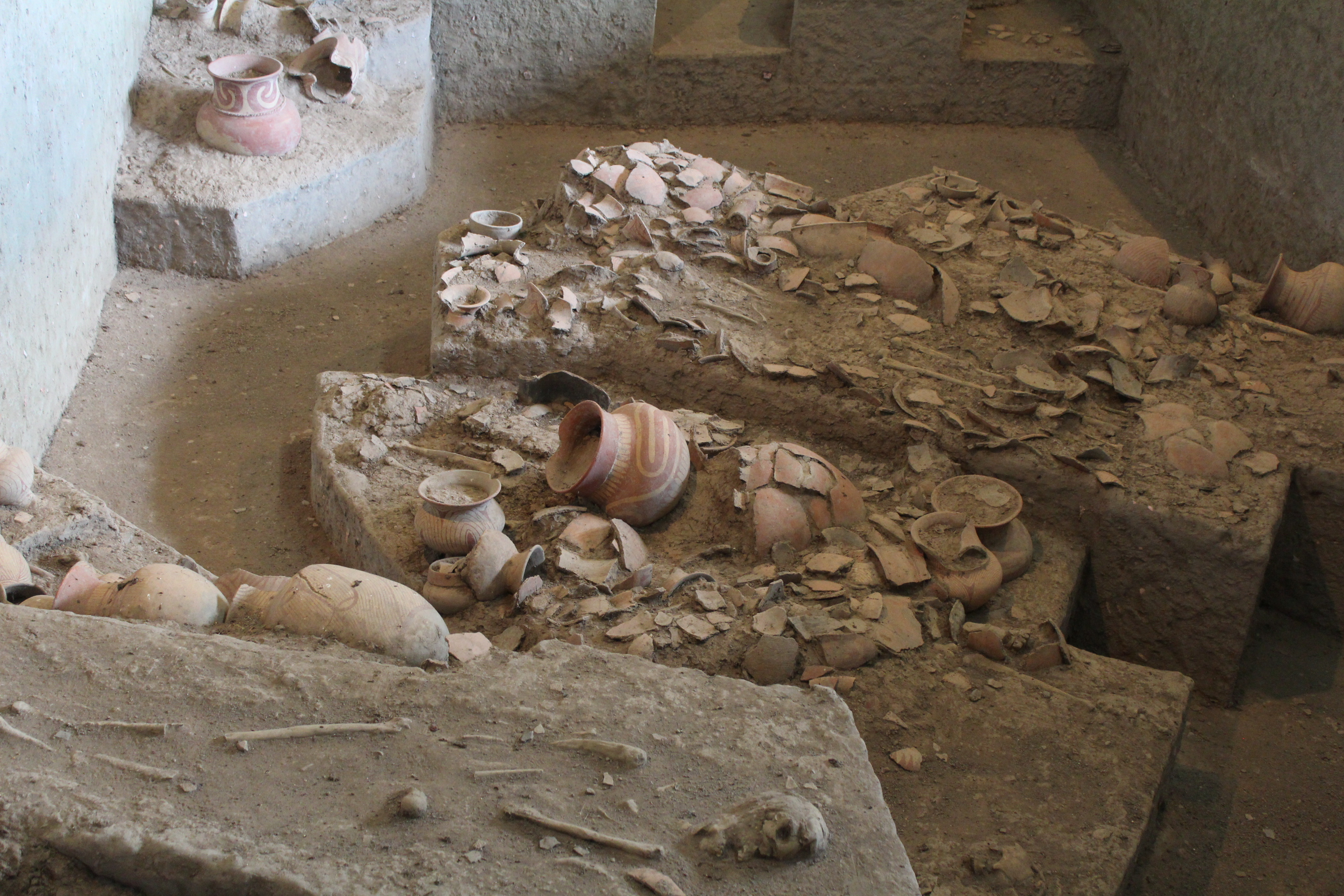
Wat Pho Si Nai is about 700 m from the Ban Chiang Museum. It is the only original archaeological site in a cluster that has not been built on by the encroachment of the village. The display documents the dense grave remains with pottery and other goods buried with the people.

== Significant bovidae zooarchaeological work ==
A faunal remain analysis done by Amphan Kijngam and Charles Higham allows for a deeper understanding of Ban Chiang’s chronological and cultural sequences. Previous research on Ban Chiang and the use of radiocarbon determinations dated the site’s initial settlement to the midfourth millennium BC, but through the work of dating human remains found, the original settlement has been dated to ca 1500 BC which in turns affects the faunal remain analysis of agriculture adaptation and environmental reconstruction. Over the course of several excavations in 1975, remains of multiple species in the bovidae family have been identified and analyzed in order to determine if domesticated cattle were introduced to Ban Chiang as was rice cultivation, or if Thai cattle use was previously present prior to rice cultivation. The remains excavated, to be considered for analysis, must have been sexually dimorphic, dense, and able to be distinguishable between bovidae species. The size and ascription of bones was used to differentiate domestic vs wild.

Through these excavations, researchers found elements from two species of wild bovidae B. gaurus and B. javanicus. Interestingly, phalanges similar in size to modern domestic samples were discovered but three of them were more closely related to a male gaur resulting in a strong hypothesis of hunting happening at Ban Chiang. A further analysis of dental wear and eruption showed patterns of being worn down and few were deciduous, little to no long bones with unfused epiphyses were found, and large butcher marks were found. Furthermore, an analysis of the second fore phalanges matched the modern domestic breed of Bubalus arnee, so it is unlikely that this breed was hunted and was actually a domesticated breed. MtDNA variation and Y-chromosomal sequences show that this breed was domesticated by 2000 BC in Southern China and Southeast Asia.

B. taurus is a common bovidae found at Ban Chiang. Similar species inherited mtDNA from B. taurus. This led zooarchaeologists to believe that B. taurus was domesticated in early Thai settlements and were descendents of the same populations. This provides insight to the spread of taurus through its introduction in China where it was then brought into northeastern and central parts of Thailand due to agriculture expansion, from early Neolithic farmers. This data is used to examine the time period of rice adaptation in northern Thailand of about 1050 BC to AD 400 which marked a significant change in early societies from hunter gatherers to farming and agriculture. Although often overlooked, faunal remains are a crucial part of archaeology in order to better understand early human evolution.

== A decline in health ==
With a reliance on the work of water buffalo in wet rice paddy fields during the Early period 2100 to 900 BC brought an increase of agriculture and an increase of new diseases for those at Ban Chiang. The over exposure of early domesticated animals is thought to have increased the risk of new diseases individuals were not accustomed to. This was determined through an analysis of life expectancy where researchers found a life expectancy of 28.1 years in the post water buffalo agriculture group and a life expectancy of 30.4 years in the pre water buffalo agriculture group. Although new innovations, such as the water buffalo, decreased life expectancy at Ban Chiang, these innovations contributed to the increase of goods, culture, and evolution at Ban Chiang.

== UNESCO World Heritage status ==
The site itself was declared a UNESCO World Heritage Site in 1992 under criterion iii, which describes a site that "bear[s] a unique or at least exceptional testimony to a cultural tradition or to a civilization which is living or has disappeared."

=== The Ban Chiang National Museum ===
The site has been increasingly attractive to Thai and international tourists, an interest fostered by a site museum that has continually upgraded its buildings and exhibitions about the site, its discovery, and archaeological interpretation, as well as the history of interest in the site by the Thai royal family. The museum includes an accurate open pit recreation of the excavation at a temple some 700 meters away called Wat Pho Si Mai, with the Ban Chiang Culture artifacts and simulated skeletons displayed as they appeared during excavation. Included in the museum's collection is the traveling exhibit curated by Dr White, titled Ban Chiang, Discovery of a Lost Bronze Age, which toured internationally following the 1974-75 Penn Museum excavations and became part of the Ban Chiang Museum permanent exhibit in 1987. The museum includes "displays and information that highlight the three main periods and six sub-periods" as well as the site's general and excavation history. Artifacts from the museum are also displayed in a Virtual Museum website. The site and museum have been reviewed by several travel publications, including CNN, TripAdvisor, and the official tourism site of Thailand. This tourist traffic in turn has had a profound impact on the village economy, with several small shops and restaurants developing near the museum.

== US legal case ==
The site made headlines in January 2008, when thousands of artifacts from the Ban Chiang and other prehistoric sites in Thailand were found to be in the collections of at least five California museums, including the Los Angeles County Museum of Art, the Mingei International Museum, the Pacific Asian Museum, the Charles W. Bowers Museum, and the UC Berkeley Art Museum. The complex plot functioned as a crime ring and involved smuggling the items out of Thailand into the US, and then donating them to museums in order to claim tax write-offs. There were said to be more items in US museums than at the site itself.

The case was brought to light during 13 high-profile raids conducted by federal law enforcement officers on various California and Chicago museums, shops, warehouses, and homes of private art collectors; it was the culmination of a five-year federal undercover investigation called Operation Antiquity. A National Park Service special agent had posed as a private collector and documented the case. The agent bought looted antiquities from two art dealers and donated them to various California art museums like the ones listed above. He found that museum officials had "varying degrees of knowledge about the antiquities' provenance" and agreed to the donations. In total, the federal government seized more than 10,000 looted artifacts, many of which were from Ban Chiang. It is estimated that the stone beads recovered from the seized collection represent more than US$22.2 billion in archaeological damage alone. This reflects both the substantial costs of conducting comparable excavations and the irreparable damage to the archaeological record.

These artifacts were examined by Dr. Joyce White, an archaeologist specializing in Northeast Thailand. Dr. White's expertise helped prove the authenticity of the artifacts and assign damage costs for each object in accordance with the Archaeological Resources Protection Act of 1979. Later in the case, she would serve as an expert witness. In a study following Operation Antiquity, published in the Journal of the Siam Society, White and her colleagues developed a methodology for quantifying the archaeological damage caused by the trafficking, estimating the resources required to properly excavate, document, and study comparable artifacts through legitimate archaeological investigations.

The alleged smuggler of the trafficking plot imported all the Southeast Asian antiquities illegally. He entered the business during a 1970s trip to Thailand, buying antiquities from Thai middlemen and flipping the items to California museums for a small profit. His frequent clients included Beverly Hills home decor shops and private art galleries like the Silk Road Gallery. Based on the smuggler's interactions with the undercover agent, federal agents obtained warrants to search the 13 properties that held the looted artifacts. The smuggler was arraigned in court in 2013 and pleaded not guilty and his trial was scheduled for November 2016, but was continued numerous times until he died in May 2017. Other alleged major players in the trafficking ring died of various causes before ever going to trial.

However, the case still yielded fruitful results, including convictions and an article that developed a new methodology for archaeological value. Jonathan and Cari Markell, owners of the Silk Road Gallery, pleaded guilty to antiquities trafficking charges in 2015. Jonathan Markell was sentenced to 18 months in prison for trafficking looted archaeological artifacts and falsifying documents, as well as a year of supervised probation. The couple was also sentenced to three years of unsupervised probation for tax evasion. Additionally, they were fined approximately US$2,000 restitution and must pay to ship more than 300 artifacts seized from their home and shuttered gallery back to Southeast Asia at an estimated cost of US$25,000.

Some of the museums discovered to possess trafficked and looted artifacts have returned them to Thailand. The Mingei International Museum has repatriated 68 artifacts, while the Bowers Museum has returned 542 vases, bowls, and other objects. By doing so, the museums avoided prosecution. The Markells themselves are expected to give back 337 antiquities as part of their sentencing agreement. The Los Angeles County Museum of Art, the Pacific Asia Museum, and the UC Berkeley Art Museum are also expected to repatriate stolen goods. This case is nationally significant for two major reasons: it was a US government-led crackdown, as opposed to being a result of complaints by foreign governments, and it also set a higher standard of accountability for museum officials who deal with cultural property, in accordance with the National Stolen Property Act and Archaeological Resources Protection Act.

== See also ==
- Ban Non Wat Archaeological Site
- Dong Son culture
- Luoyue people
- Udon Thani province
- Northeastern Thailand
- Si Satchanalai Historical Park
- Sukhothai Historical Park
- Ayutthaya Historical Park
- Si Thep Historical Park
- Phu Phra Bat Historical Park
- List of World Heritage Sites in Thailand

== Notes ==
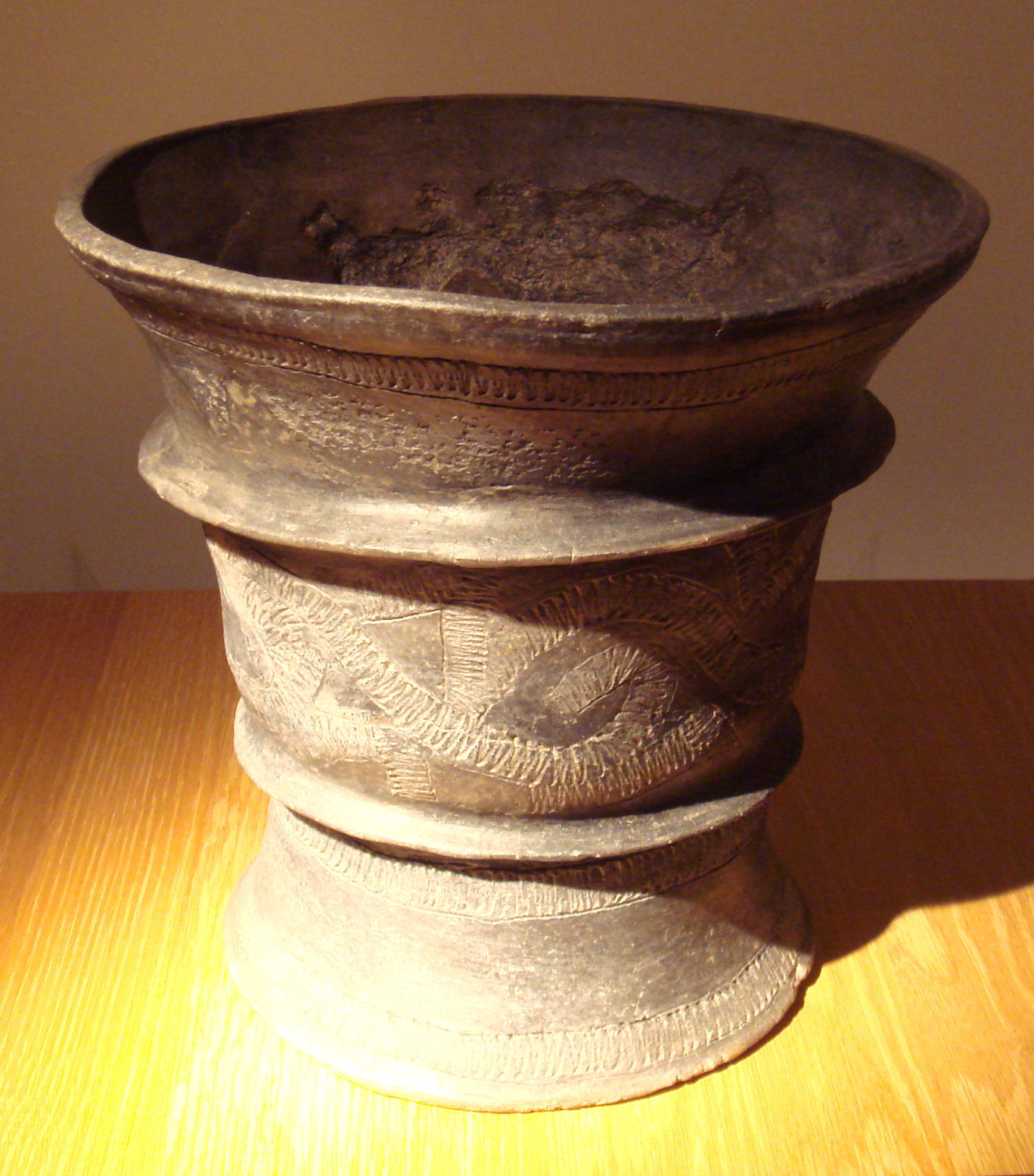
Black ceramic jar, Ban Chiang culture, Thailand, 1200–800 BCE.

After Dr. Gorman's death in 1981, Dr. Joyce White continued research and publications as Director of the Ban Chiang Project at the University of Pennsylvania Museum of Archaeology and Anthropology. Dr. White's research endeavors have included analysis and publication of Penn's excavations at Ban Chiang in Thailand in the mid-1970s; ecological field research at Ban Chiang in 1978–1981 including investigations of how local people identified and used plants; lake coring and ecological mapping for palaeoenvironmental research in several parts of Thailand during the 1990s; and, since 2001, survey and excavation in northern Laos, especially in Luang Prabang Province. For Ban Chiang, White, along with Elizabeth Hamilton, has published a monograph through the University of Pennsylvania Press on the ancient metallurgy of Ban Chiang and nearby sites. The last of the four volumes was published in 2021.
