= Joyce White =

American archaeologist

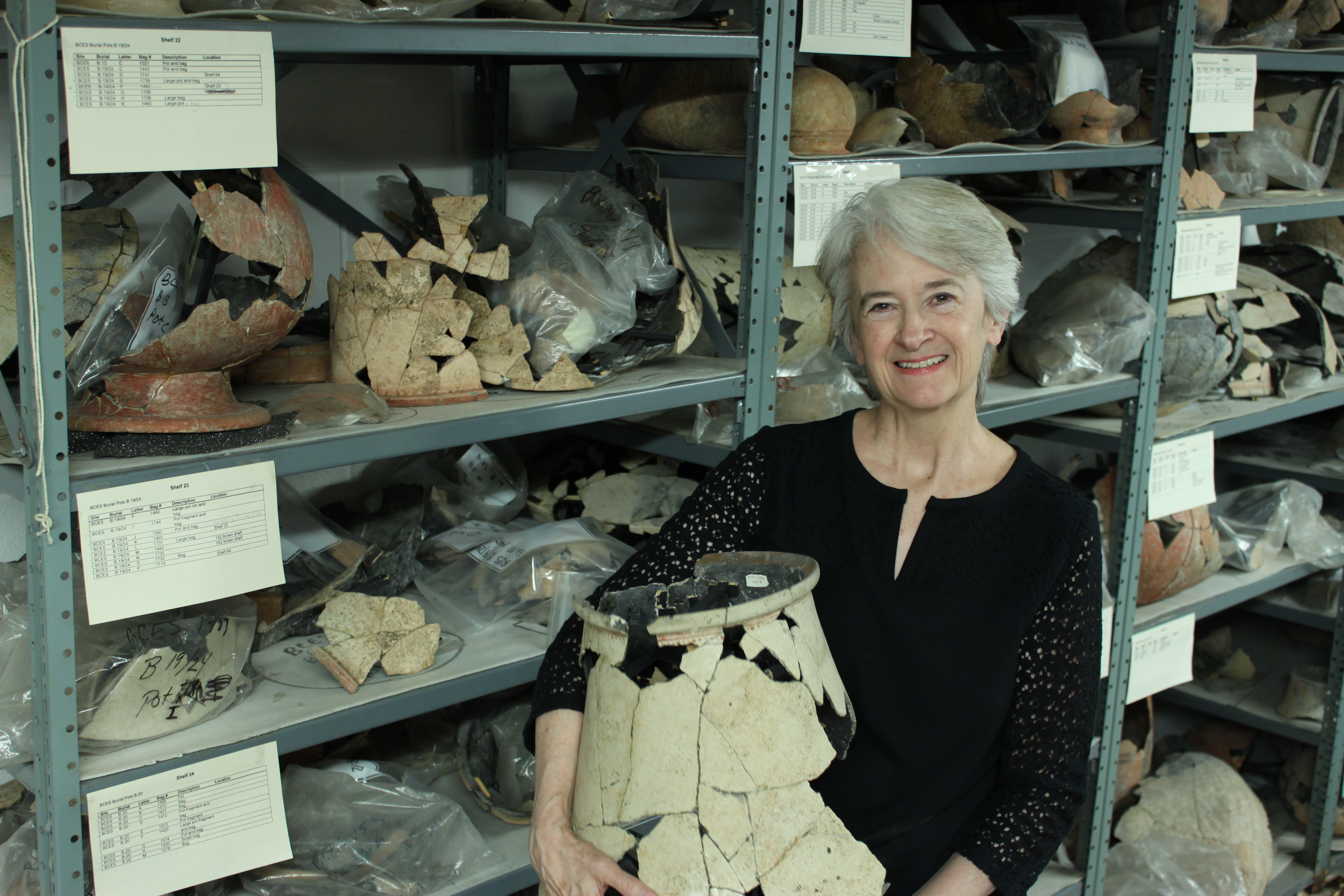
- Joyce White

Institute for Southeast Asian Archaeology
- Incumbent
- Assumed office October 1, 2013

Personal details
- Born: Joyce White Chicago, Illinois, United States
- Education: University of Pennsylvania
- Profession: Archaeologist
- Website: Institute for Southeast Asian Archaeology

Joyce C. White is an American archaeologist, an adjunct professor of anthropology at the University of Pennsylvania, and executive director of the new Institute for Southeast Asian Archaeology. Her research primarily concerns decades-long multidisciplinary archaeological investigations in Thailand and Laos covering the prehistoric human occupation of the middle reaches of the Mekong River Basin. She is considered the world's leading expert on the UNESCO World Heritage Site of Ban Chiang, Thailand, and directs an archaeological fieldwork program in the Luang Prabang Province of Laos. She has become a strong advocate of cultural heritage preservation and has served as an expert witness in an antiquities trafficking case for the U.S. Department of Justice.

== Early life ==
Joyce White initially settled on a career in archaeology when she observed an excavation at a medieval church and cemetery in England at the age of 15. While this initial incident inclined her towards a focus on Europe, this changed when she saw a photograph of Thailand during a professor's presentation on his excavation there in graduate school. She notes that "it was a vivid experience. I saw myself in that slide." Despite discouragement from professors, she changed her focus to Southeast Asian archaeology.

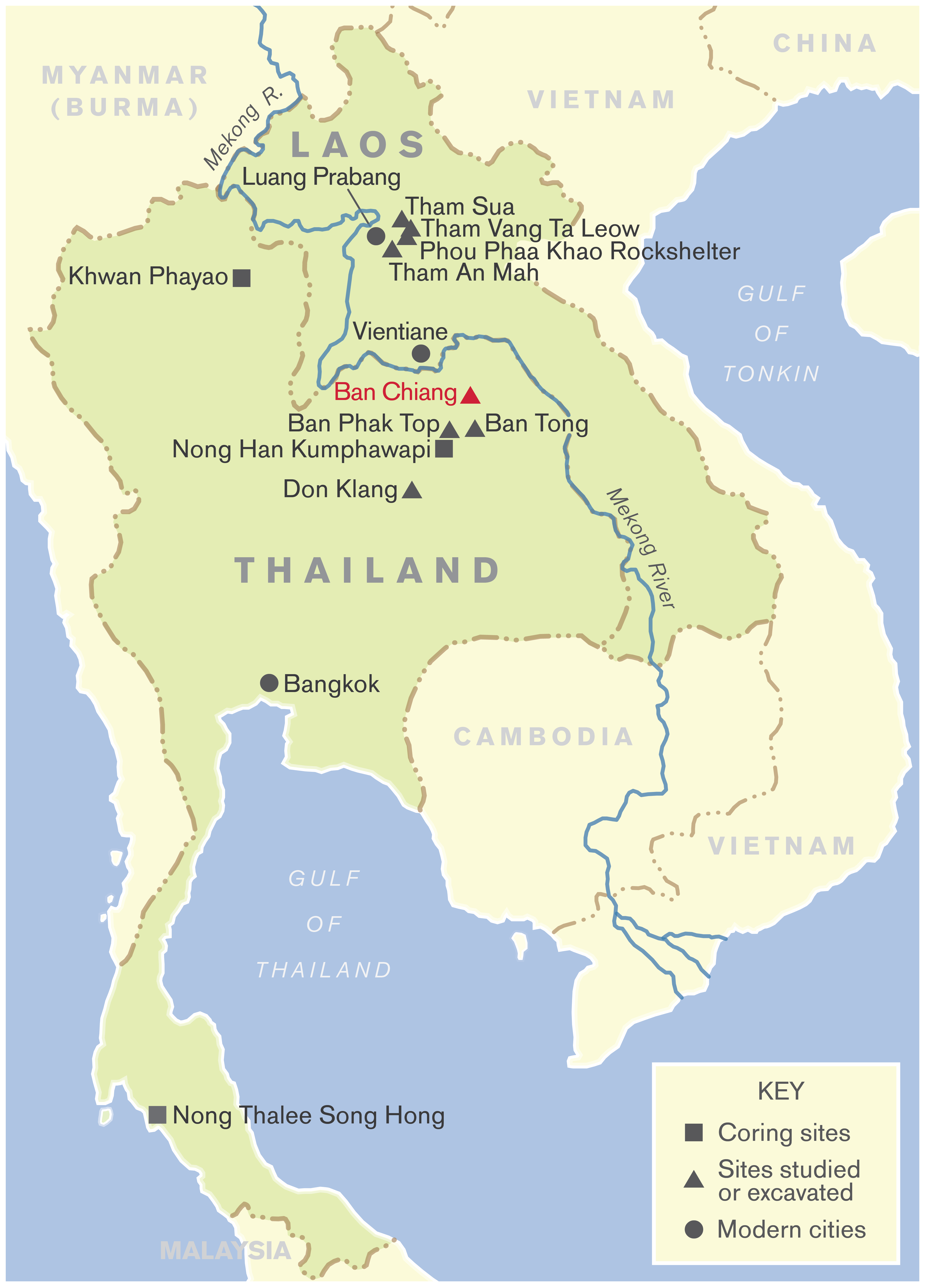
Localities in Thailand and Laos where Joyce White has conducted field research and/or studied recovered remains.

== Research and career ==
White is a senior Southeast Asian archaeologist in the Greater Philadelphia area. She received her MA and PhD in anthropology from the University of Pennsylvania and holds the position of lllConsulting lllScholar at the University's Museum of Archaeology and Anthropology. While working on her dissertation, she lived in Thailand doing field work for 20 months from 1979 to 1981. White founded the Institute for Southeast Asian Archaeology (ISEAA) in October 2013 in order to build upon the decades-long archaeological research programs in Thailand and Laos undertaken by the University of Pennsylvania. White is the current director of the Middle Mekong Archaeological Project and of the Ban Chiang Project (since 1982) at the University of Pennsylvania Museum of Archaeology and Anthropology. In 2021, the Office of Science and Technology of the Royal Thai Embassy, Washington D.C. selected White for their Friend of Thai Science award for her contributions to Thai archaeology.

== Ban Chiang Project ==
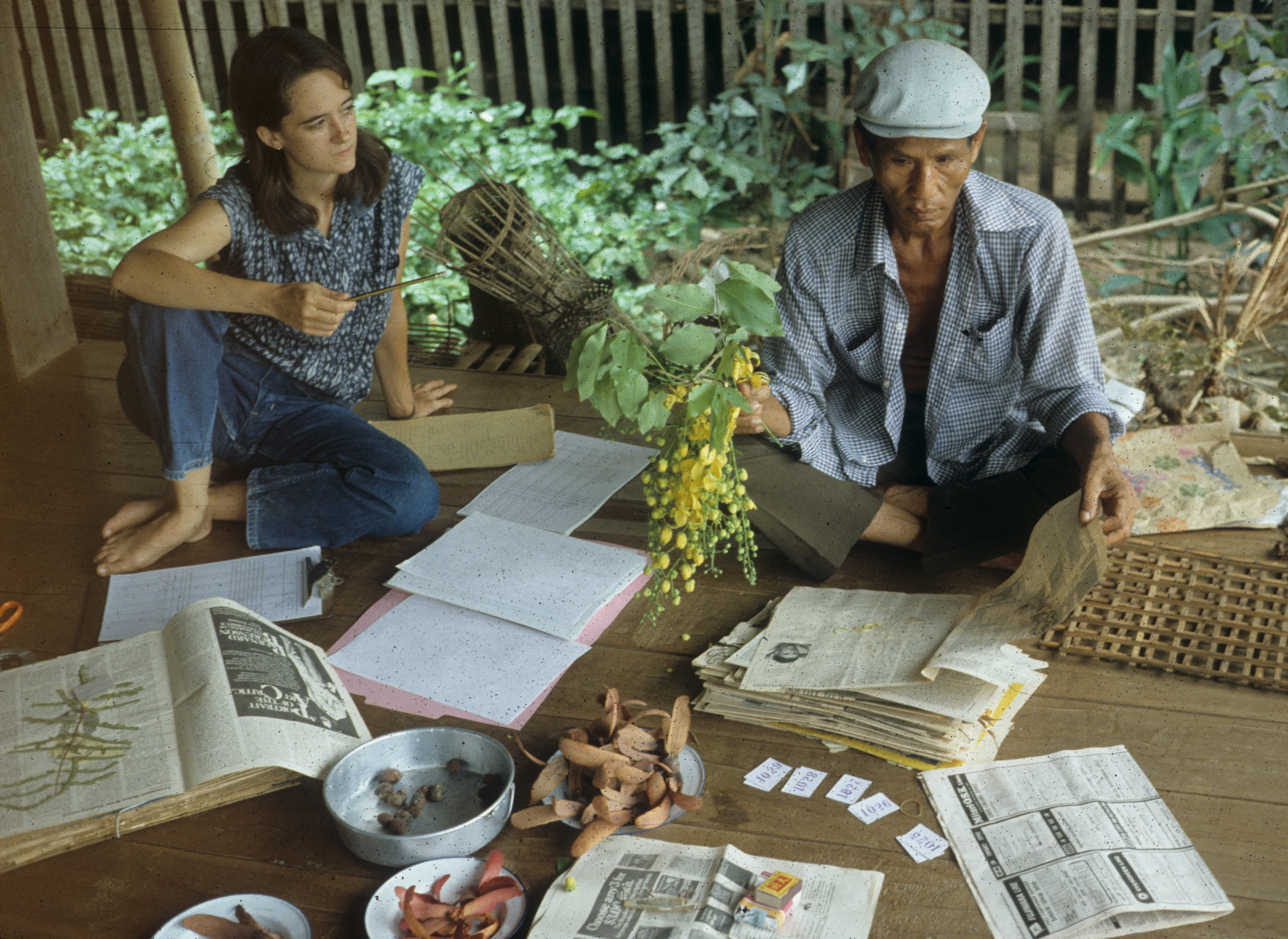
Joyce White and Lung Li look over gathered plant specimens in 1981.

White's investigation of Southeast Asian prehistory began in the mid-1970s when, as a PhD student under the supervision of the late Chester Gorman, she ran the labs conducting post-excavation analysis of artifacts from Gorman's excavations in northern and northeast Thailand. From 1976 she focused on the analysis of the metal age site of Ban Chiang, a site subsequently named in 1992 as a UNESCO World Heritage Site. In 1978 she initiated an ethnoecological research program in the Ban Chiang area studying the local understanding of indigenous natural resources with a special emphasis on native plants. While there, she compiled an ethnographic collection of everyday traditional material culture items (e.g., baskets, tools, pottery, etc.) for the Penn Museum. After conducting this field project in Ban Chiang village for nearly two years in 1979–1981, she returned to Philadelphia where, following Gorman's premature death in June 1981, she curated the Smithsonian-produced traveling exhibition “Ban Chiang: Discovery of a Lost Bronze Age” and authored its catalog. The exhibition was later installed in a branch of Thailand's National Museum in Ban Chiang village and parts of it are still on display. In 1986, White completed her PhD thesis at Penn that revised the Gorman chronology for Ban Chiang. Since that time White's career has centered on the multi-disciplinary investigation of the human past in Thailand and Laos. She continued with the analysis of the Ban Chiang site at Penn Museum as a senior research scientist and later as an associate curator. In 1993 she founded the Friends of Ban Chiang to facilitate fund-raising to continue the post-excavation analysis and publication program. In the mid-1990s she was co-principal investigator of the Thailand Palaeoenvironment Project, which cored sediments from lakes in northeast, north, and south Thailand that for the first time in that country retrieved vegetation evidence from the terminal Pleistocene to the Late Holocene from each area. The first Ban Chiang monograph published in 2002 was on the human remains from the site and was authored by Michael Pietrusewsky and Michele Douglas. On February 9, 2010, White was honored by Her Royal Highness of Thailand Crown Princess Maha Chakri Sirindhorn at the opening of the new National Museum at Ban Chiang, Thailand.

== Middle Mekong Archaeological Project (MMAP) ==
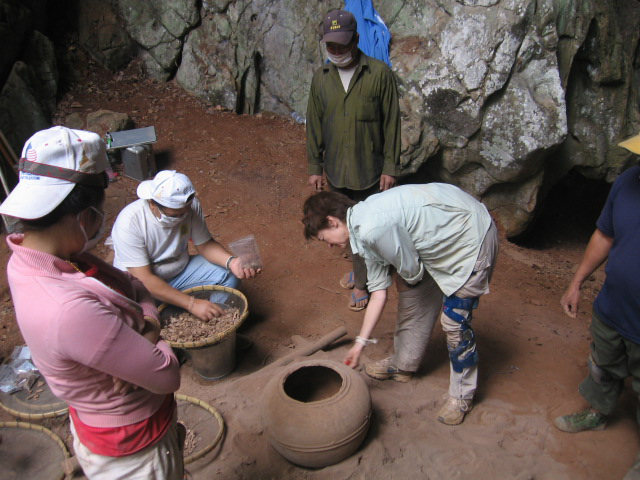
In 2010, MMAP undertook a test excavation at the Tham An Mah rockshelter in northern Laos. During the field season, evidence for Iron Age burials dating to about 2000 years ago, and Stone Age occupation dating back to about 13,000 years ago, was found in the rockshelter.

In 2001, White initiated what was to become the first and so far only archaeological research program in Laos led by an American, the Middle Mekong Archaeological Project (MMAP). White has pursued larger Mekong regional questions raised by the original Ban Chiang excavations in Thailand and her work on the Thailand Palaeoenvironment Project. With seed funding from the National Science Foundation and the National Geographic Society in 2005, the Middle Mekong Archaeological Project (MMAP) has excavated and surveyed numerous sites along the Mekong and its tributaries in Luang Prabang province in northern Laos, with the goal of investigating early human settlement of the Mekong Valley.

From 2008 to 2013, during White's tenure as Associate Curator for Asia at University of Pennsylvania Museum of Archaeology and Anthropology, she directed the Museum's program to Strengthen Southeast Asian Archaeology, funded by the Henry Luce Foundation. In addition to surveys and cave excavations, a variety of scientific and capacity-building endeavors sought to enhance knowledge and skills among Asian and western archaeologists to lay the foundation for future development of archaeological research in the Middle Mekong Basin. By early 2010, 85 historic and prehistoric sites had been recorded by MMAP in Luang Prabang and four cave sites have been excavated, including Tham An Mah. In 2013 several ancillary scientific studies were undertaken, including palaeoenvironmental research using speleothems led by a team from the University of California at Irvine, and population history research using modern human DNA led by a team from Oxford University. The Luce Program also included a year of intensive analysis of hundreds of pottery vessels excavated from Ban Chiang on loan to the Penn Museum as well as extensive development of a regional archaeological database that contains data from both the Ban Chiang and Lao research programs.

== Institute for Southeast Asian Archaeology (ISEAA) ==
In 2013 White founded the ISEAA, which is dedicated to the multi-disciplinary investigation of Southeast Asia's archaeological past in order to advance that knowledge for the benefit of scholars as well as the public. Due to strategic decisions to downsize its research staff, Penn Museum ended funding for its research program for Southeast Asian Archaeology in 2013. The new non-profit Institute was then created by White with initial support from several founding donors. The Institute's objective is to continue the internationally renowned research and publication programs of the Ban Chiang Project and the Middle Mekong Archaeological Project (MMAP), in order to preserve for posterity the knowledge of the human past revealed by those pioneering research programs. ISEAA can also serve as a center for future research projects in Southeast Asian archaeology.

== Recent scholarship ==
White's scholarship has significantly influenced the scholarly discourse concerning the place of Southeast Asia in world prehistory, as well as public appreciation for Southeast Asian archaeology generally and for Ban Chiang in particular. A 2009 publication she co-authored with Dr. Elizabeth Hamilton has been described as providing an “innovative model of cultural transmission of metal technology [that is] a significant intellectual landmark in archaeometallurgy.”

White, along with Elizabeth Hamilton, has completed a four-volume Ban Chiang and Northeast Thailand metals monograph. The work presents metals and related evidence from four sites in northeast Thailand: Ban Chiang, Ban Tong, Ban Phak Top, and Don Klang. It is the second installment in the Thai Archaeology Monograph Series, published by the University of Pennsylvania Press and distributed for the University of Pennsylvania Museum of Archaeology and Anthropology. The first volume of the metals monograph, published in 2018, discusses different viewpoints used to assess the materials at Ban Chiang and other Northeast Thai sites and reviews and critiques the current archaeological paradigm. It also introduces new archaeometallurgical paradigms for analyzing the materials found at these sites and their relation to ancient society, economics, and culture. The second volume, published in early 2019, explains the methodological and technical analyses for the metals, presents evidence from the four archaeological sites, and applies the paradigms from the first volume to support new insights for this evidence. The third volume, published in late 2019, presents the Ban Chiang metallurgical evidence in a regional context and examines the site's interactions with others throughout central and northeast Thailand. The fourth volume, 2D, was published in 2022 and contains the detailed catalog of all the metal and crucible remains, along with the results of the laboratory analyses and photomicrographs.

Published in 2021, Whites article, co-authored with Elizabeth Hamilton, appeared in the journal Archaeological Research in Asia. This open-access article, entitled “The metal age of Thailand and Ricardo’s Law of Comparative Advantage” argues that, contrary to established theory in Southeast Asia that ties the appearance of copper-base technology to the appearance of elites and top-down control of production, in prehistoric Thailand metal production and metal artifact production emerged in decentralized communities, without elite control. This system fits a scenario termed ‘heterarchical’ rather than ‘hierarchical’. The evidence for this hypothesis is based on the extensive and detailed analysis of metal remains from Ban Chiang, Ban Pak Top, Ban Tong, and Don Klang extensively laid out in the Metals Monographs, as well as the results of analytical work at 21 additional consumer sites and lead-isotope analysis from three metal production sites.

Her most recent publication, co-authored with David J. Welch, Judith R. McNeill, and Todd Swain, is featured in The Journal of the Siam Society. The article, “Quantifying Archaeological Damage: The Operation Antiquity Seizures from Thailand,” presents the methodology developed to asses the archaeological damage caused by the looting in the case Operation Antiquity. This is the first quantitative assessment of the severe damage inflicted on Thailand’s cultural heritage. The study illustrates that, while looting cases typically emphasize the "commercial value" of individual objects, this valuation often overlooks their archaeological value (AV), which represents the cost of excavation for comparable rates of artifact recovery and the irreparable damage to the archaeological record caused by looting. As described in the article, AV can represent a much greater monetary value.

== Expert witness ==
In the US federal investigation Operation Antiquity, which investigated an artifact smuggling ring especially dealing with Ban Chiang artifacts, White acted as an expert witness for the U.S. Department of Justice. In January 2008, 500 federal agents served warrants at 13 locations including several museums tied to the extensive ring.

White was responsible for "authenticating more than 10,000 prehistoric Thai artifacts that had been smuggled from Thailand since about 2003." Her testimony in the case argued the seized artifacts represented more than 150 times what had been scientifically excavated at Ban Chiang and similar sites. The case led to several convictions, fines, plea deals, and prison time for some smugglers. Some of the museums have returned to Thailand artifacts seized in the case.

== Awards ==
In 2016, White was given an award by the United States Attorney's Office of Central California for her service as an expert witness in the US Federal investigation Operation Antiquity.

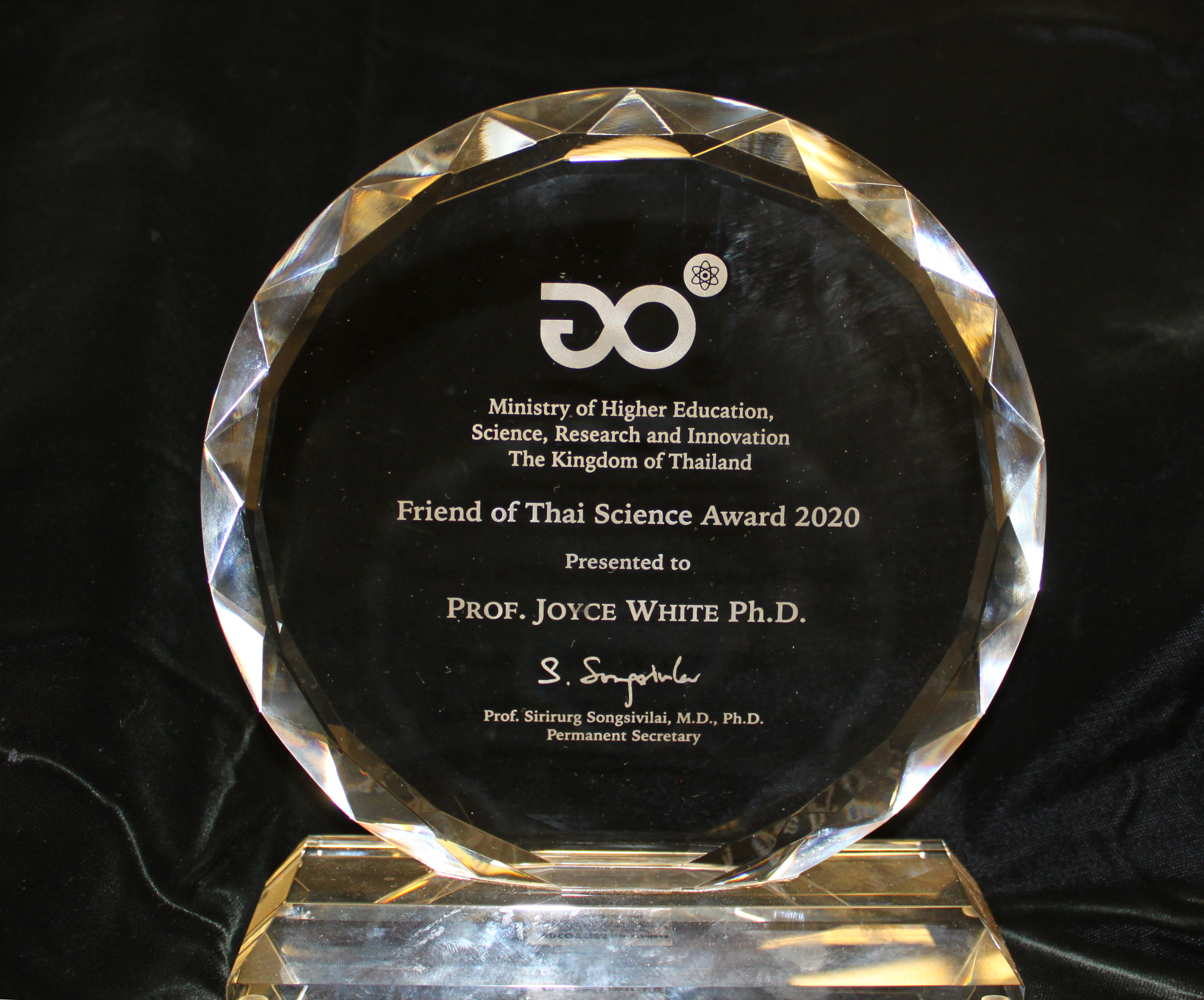
Joyce White was named a Friend of Thai Science in 2021

Every year, the Office of Science and Technology of the Royal Thai Embassy in Washington, D.C. selects two recipients for their Friend of Thai Science award. For 2020, the Office gave this award to Joyce White for her accomplishments in Thai archaeology and scholarship. These include the publication of the Ban Chiang Metals Monograph, fostering Thai-Lao collaboration in local archaeological investigations through the Middle Mekong Archaeological Project (MMAP) that she initiated, and the development of digital resources for Southeast Asian Archaeology.

== Selected publications ==
- 1982 Ban Chiang: Discovery of a Lost Bronze Age, The University Museum, University of Pennsylvania and the Smithsonian Institution Traveling Exhibition Service.
- 1988 Early East Asian Metallurgy: The Southern Tradition. In The Beginning of the Use of Metals and Alloys, edited by R. Maddin, pp. 175 181. MIT Press, Cambridge.
- 1992 (with B. Bronson) Radiocarbon and Chronology in Southeast Asia. In Chronologies in Old World Archaeology, 3rd ed., edited by R. Ehrich, Vol. 1: pp. 491–503, Vol. 2: pp. 475–515. University of Chicago Press, Chicago.
- 1995 Modeling the Development of Early Rice Agriculture: Ethnoecological Perspectives from Northeast Thailand. Asian Perspectives 34(1):37-68.
- 1995 Incorporating Heterarchy into Theory on Socio-Political Development: the Case from Southeast Asia. In Heterarchy and the Analysis of Complex Societies, edited by R. Ehrenreich, C. Crumley and J. Levy, pp. 101–123. Archeological Papers of the American Anthropological Association, No. 6. American Anthropological Association, Arlington.
- 1996 (With V. Pigott) From Community Craft to Regional Specialization: Intensification of Copper Production in Pre-State Thailand. In Craft Specialization and Social Evolution: in Memory of V. Gordon Childe, edited by Bernard Wailes, pp. 151–175. University of Pennsylvania Museum Monograph 93.
- White; Penny, Daniel; Kealhofer, Lisa; Maloney, Bernard (2004). "Vegetation Changes from the Terminal Pleistocene Through the Holocene from Three Areas of Archaeological Significance in Thailand" (PDF). Quaternary International. 113 (1): 111–132. Archived from the original (PDF) on October 4, 2018.
- 2004 (with C. Gorman) "Patterns in Amorphous Industries: The Hoabinhian Viewed Through a Lithic Reduction Sequence. " IN Southeast Asian Archaeology: A Festschrift for Wilhelm G. Solheim II. Edited by Victor Paz. Quezon City: University of the Philippines Press. pp. 411–441.
- 2008 "Archaeology of the Middle Mekong: Introduction to the Luang Prabang Exploratory Survey. " IN Recherches nouvelles sur le Laos (New research on Laos), edited by Yves Goudineau and Michel Lorrillard. Coll. Etudes thématiques, no. 18, Paris : Publication de l’École Française d’Extrême Orient. pp. 37–52.
- 2009 (with H. Lewis, B. Bouasisengpaseuth, B. Marwick & K. Arrell) Archaeological Investigations in Northern Laos: New Contributions to Southeast Asian Prehistory. Antiquity Vol 83 Issue 319 March 2009.
- 2009 (with E. Hamilton) "The Transmission of Early Bronze Technology to Thailand: New Perspectives". Journal of World Prehistory 22: 357–397.
- 2011 (with C. Eyre) Residential Burial and the Metal Age of Thailand. In Residential Burial: A Multi-regional Exploration. Rod Adams and Stacie King, eds. Archeological Papers of the American Anthropological Association, Number 20. American Anthropological Association, Arlington VA. pp. 59–78.
- 2011 "Emergence of Cultural Diversity in Mainland Southeast Asia: a View from Prehistory " in Mainland Southeast Asia: a View from Prehistory. In Dynamics of Human Diversity: the Case of Mainland Southeast Asia. N.J. Enfield, ed. Pacific Linguistics 627. Pacific Linguistics, Canberra. pp. 9–46.
- 2013 Ban Non Wat: New Light on the Metal Ages of Southeast Asia. Antiquity 87(337): 909–011.
- 2018 (with E. Hamilton) Ban Chiang, Northeast Thailand, Volume 2A: Background to the Study of the Metal Remains, University of Pennsylvania Press, Philadelphia. ISBN 9781931707787
- 2019 (with E. Hamilton) Ban Chiang, Northeast Thailand, Volume 2B: Metals and Related Evidence from Ban Chiang, Ban Tong, Ban Phak Top, and Don Klang, University of Pennsylvania Press, Philadelphia. ISBN 9781931707213
- 2022 (with E. Hamilton) Ban Chiang, Northeast Thailand, Volume 2D: Catalogs for Metals and Related Remains from Ban Chiang, Ban Tong, Ban Phak Top, and Don Klang, University of Pennsylvania Press, Philadelphia. ISBN 9780934718400
- 2021 (with E. Hamilton) “The Metal Age of Thailand and Ricardo’s Law of Comparative Advantage.” Archaeological Research in Asia 27 (Article 100305). https://doi.org/10.1016/j.ara.2021.100305.
- 2026 (with D. Welch, J.R. McNeill, and T. Swain) “Quantifying Archaeological Damage: The Operation Antiquity Seizures from Thailand,” The Journal of the Siam Society, 114(2): 19–44. https://doi.org/10.69486/114.2.2026.3a.
