= John Henry Browne =

American lawyer

- Born: August 11, 1946 (age 80); Oak Ridge, Tennessee
- Occupation: Attorney
- Employer(s): Law Offices of John Henry Browne, P.S.
- Website: https://www.jhblawyer.com/

John Henry Browne (born August 11, 1946) is an American criminal defense attorney practicing in Seattle, Washington. Browne is known for his zeal in defending his clients, his flair for garnering media attention, and for being known as the “plead guilty to avoid the death penalty” lawyer. He has represented defendants in a number of high-profile cases, including serial killer Ted Bundy, Colton Harris-Moore (also known as "The Barefoot Bandit"), Benjamin Ng and Martin Pang. He has tried over 250 criminal cases to verdict. Browne and his actions have been the subject of some controversy, and he has sometimes been criticized for his peculiar and combative style both in and out of the courtroom. He is particularly known for obtaining sympathetic treatment for his clients by shifting the focus away from the serious crimes that were committed by arguing for consideration of the background of the defendant and the circumstances in which the events took place.

== Particular cases ==
In May 2011, Browne defended Christopher Scott Wilson in the case of the murder of Mackenzie Cowell. Wilson was charged with first-degree murder. Prosecutors accused Wilson of having a fascination with death and compared him to the fictional serial killer Dexter Morgan from the TV series Dexter. As part of a plea bargain, Wilson pleaded guilty to manslaughter and was sentenced to 14 years in prison.

On March 14, 2012, Browne took the case of Staff Sgt. Robert Bales, the U.S. soldier accused of murdering 16 Afghan citizens (mostly women and children) in an incident known as the Kandahar massacre. Browne defended Bales alongside military lawyers. Browne described Bales as "mild-mannered", and claimed his client was upset after seeing a friend's leg blown off the day before the killings, but held no animosity toward Muslims. Browne said "I think the message for the public in general is that he's one of our boys and they need to treat him fairly." Browne also criticized anonymous reports from government officials, stating "the government is going to want to blame this on an individual rather than blame it on the war." In order to avoid the death penalty, Bales pleaded guilty to sixteen counts of murder and six counts of assault and attempted murder in a plea deal. On August 23, 2013, he was sentenced to life in prison without parole.

Browne's client Colton Harris-Moore was accused of at least 67 crimes in a long-running crime spree spanning several U.S. states, Canada, and the Bahamas. The crimes included burglaries and thefts of cars, boats, airplanes, store property, and personal property. By arguing for consideration of Harris-Moore's abusive upbringing, Browne was able to arrange a plea bargain involving a 6 1/2-year prison sentence, which was less severe than was generally expected in this highly publicized case.

In 2011, when representing a client Dominic Briceno against drug dealing charges, Browne got into a significant dispute with the judge in the case and made various accusations against the judge. A mistrial was declared, and the judge later died before the issues were resolved.

On behalf of David Wayne Kunze, Browne convinced a Washington state appeals court to overturn the murder conviction for the first man ever convicted based on forensic "earprint" evidence. After winning Kunze a new trial, he discredited a key witness and convinced prosecutors to drop all charges and set Kunze free in 2001.

Browne also gained nationwide attention as lead plaintiff in a lawsuit filed in 2007 by class action lawyer Steve Berman against Avvo, a law-related review site. He was reportedly upset that the site had rated him "average" via a rating system that considered disciplinary actions that had been taken against attorneys. He claimed that the rating system was deceptive, not based on any valid criteria, and not reliable. The suit against Avvo was dismissed on pre-trial motion, on grounds that the ratings were expressions of opinion protected by the First Amendment to the United States Constitution.

In 2006, the Washington State Bar admonished Browne as part of a settlement of ethics charges stemming from compensation issues, saying that he charged more than what had been arranged in a written agreement. Such an admonition was the lowest form of Bar disciplinary action. Browne said that an assistant had prepared the written agreement and he had not known about it.

In 1995, Martin Pang set fire to his parents' frozen foods processing business – resulting in the deaths of four firefighters with the Seattle Fire Department – and fled to Brazil, where Browne successfully argued before the Brazilian Supreme Court that treaty law required that Pang could only be extradited if he was not charged with murder. As a result, King County Prosecutor Norm Maleng was forced to drop the initial charges of first degree arson and four counts of first degree murder and no longer seek the death penalty, thus sparing Pang a potential death sentence.

Browne was less successful in representing his client Darrell Cloud, who was accused in 1994 of murdering his former middle-school teacher with a firearm after years of sexual abuse. Browne guided his client in rejecting a plea bargain offer, and then presented an unsuccessful insanity defense in a jury trial. Cloud was convicted of first degree murder, and later successfully argued that Browne had harmed his ability to conduct plea negotiations by making an unreasonable assessment of his chances of success in the trial (which Browne had described as a 95% chance of a favorable outcome). By blaming Browne's conduct, Cloud was able to obtain a reduced sentence on a lesser charge.

His client Benjamin Ng had participated in killing thirteen people in the 1983 incident known as the Wah Mee massacre. Browne was able to avoid his client receiving the death penalty by arguing that Mr. Ng had previously suffered a brain injury and that it was inconclusive whether he was the shooter.

Browne defended the professional American football player Duke Fergerson of the Seattle Seahawks against a charge of rape, obtaining an acquittal in 1980.

== Sources ==
- John Henry Browne, The Devil’s Defender: My Odyssey Through American Criminal Justice from Ted Bundy to the Kandahar Massacre, Chicago Review Press City, 2016.
