= Tham An Mah =

Archaeological site in Laos

- Horse Saddle Cave
- location in Laos
- 19°53′0.2″N 102°8′4.8″E
- Type: Cave
- Location: Luang Prabang Province
- Region: northern Laos
- Part of: Pa Hang Mountain

Site notes
- Material: limestone, karst
- Length: 40 m (130 ft)
- Width: 30 m (98 ft)
- Excavation dates: 2010
- Archaeologists: Joyce White, Helen Lewis, Middle Mekong Archaeological Project, Department of Heritage of Laos

Tham An Mah, (Lao: ຖ້ຳອານມ້າ, Horse Saddle Cave) is an archaeological site located in the Luang Prabang Province of Laos. The site was initially excavated in 2010 by a joint team of the Middle Mekong Archaeological Project and the Department of Heritage of Laos. Perhaps most important is the site's status as one of the stone jar burial sites from iron age Laos, the most famous of which is the Plain of Jars. Test excavations in 2010 included two trenches. Finds from trench B included a circular stone disk, possibly made of limestone or a similar material. The initial reports listed the possibility that the disk represented a jar covering or grave marker similar to those found on the Plain of Jars. The B trench also included the remains of four pots, one of which was directly under the discovered disk and accompanied by loose remains. The single datable piece of material that has thus far been recorded was from the lowermost portion of the excavation and gave a date of c. 13,000, which could indicate an earlier site not recorded. The site also included a Buddhist painting on the cave walls that villagers believed was from the 1950s.

== Looting ==
The interior has been almost entirely destroyed by looters, though initial reports suggested the damage was not critical. When the archaeologists returned in 2013, they characterized the site as almost entirely destroyed. Villagers stated that the looters were after the fine sediment inside the cave that could be resold as gardening soil elsewhere. Given the later destruction, only a preliminary analysis of the test excavation is available to provide information on the site.

== See also ==
- Tam Pa Ling Cave
