= Luke Elliott Sommer =

American-Canadian US Army Ranger and bank robber (born 1986)

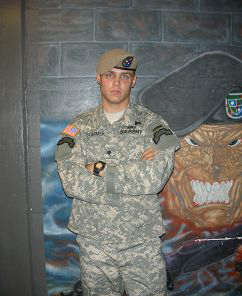
Sommer in 2005

Luke Elliott Sommer (born June 26, 1986, in Peachland, British Columbia) is a former US Army ranger and bank robber. On May 27, 2008, after almost two years under house arrest in Canada, he pleaded guilty to the August 7, 2006 robbery of a branch of the Bank of America in Tacoma, Washington. Sommer is currently serving his sentence at Coleman II United States Penitentiary.

== The heist and subsequent criminal charges ==
Sommer's arsenal

On August 7, 2006, four men brandishing weapons robbed the Bank of America branch in South Tacoma of $54,011. While two robbers with automatic rifles covered the bank's entrances, the other two, with handguns, moved swiftly to confront the tellers. The gang's leader wielded a 9 mm Glock 19 with a red laser sight, which he pointed threateningly at the employees. While one of the door guards called out the elapsed time, Luke Elliott Sommer, the gang leader, vaulted over the teller counter and barged behind the bandit barrier into the cages, shouting threats and commands. He ordered the tellers to give him only stacks of banded $20, $50 and $100 bills and not to include any bait money, with prerecorded serial numbers, or dye packs. His assistant collected the money from the teller stations and took $20,000 from a money cart inside the vault. At the two-minute mark, the timekeeper shouted "Let's go!" The gang exited the bank with $54,011 stuffed into duffel bags, ran down a side street into an alley, jumped into a waiting automobile, and sped away. According to the bank surveillance camera, the robbery, executed with military precision, took place in just two minutes and 21 seconds.

The gang were tracked down because they failed to remove the front license plate from their getaway vehicle. A bystander noted the number, and passed it to the police. Within three days of the robbery, FBI agents arrested Alex Blum at his parents' home in Greenwood Village, Colorado. Blum confessed to driving the getaway car, and named the other members of the gang, including Luke Elliott Sommer.

On December 15, 2008 Sommer was sentenced to 24 years in prison and 5 years of supervised release for conspiracy to commit armed bank robbery, armed bank robbery, brandishing a firearm during and in relation to a crime of violence, and possession of an unregistered destructive device (a hand grenade).

Sommer was sentenced to an additional 20 years in prison on March 8, 2010 for assaulting a co-defendant and plotting to kill a federal prosecutor.

== Background ==
Luke Elliott Sommer was born on June 26, 1986, in Peachland, British Columbia, Canada. He is the son of Luke and Christel Sommer (who have since divorced). He is the oldest of six children and has one son. Sommer was raised as a Christian and was home-schooled for a majority of his life. He travelled extensively with his grandmother, Denise Fichtner, who died on August 8, one day after the robbery in Tacoma.

Sommer joined the Army on June 26, 2003, and was assigned to a basic training class at Sand Hill, Fort Benning Georgia on November 4, 2003, graduating on January 27, 2004. After completing OSUT (One Station Unit Training) he attended and completed Airborne School at Fort Benning prior to attending the Ranger Indoctrination Program (RIP) in the green fence at Ranger Training Detachment. After completing RIP Sommer was sent to Fort Lewis Washington to the 1st Platoon (Madslashers), Charlie Company, 2nd battalion of the 75th Ranger Regiment. Sommer was at the unit for less than three weeks before he left his girlfriend and newborn son and was shipped to Baghdad, Iraq, where he remained until September 2004.

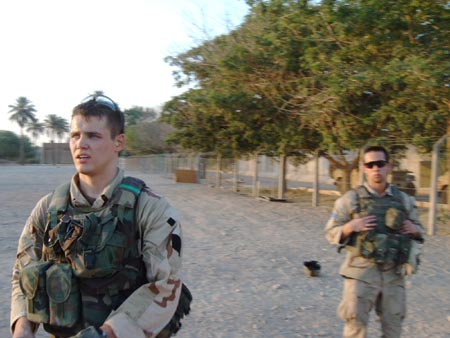
Sommer and Olinger in Iraq, 2004

After returning from Iraq, Sommer conducted ranger consolidated skill training, which includes hot-wiring vehicles, operating heavy machines and basic EMT courses. After spending six months in the United States, he was again deployed with 1st Platoon, Charlie Company overseas, this time to Bagram, Afghanistan.

After Sommer returned from Afghanistan in September 2005, he was sent to the United States Army Ranger School. He spent nearly seven months completing the prestigious military leadership school, and although he had to restart the school twice, he managed to complete the school on April 7, 2006.

After attending Ranger School, court documents assert that Sommer began recruiting and training several members of his unit and two civilians for what was called a robbery with "military style precision and planning." After the robbery, he was arrested and detained in the North Fraser Pretrial Centre where other prisoners such as Rakesh Saxena and Robert William Pickton were held. Sommer was released on bail in September 2006 and was then placed under house arrest.

=== House arrest in Canada ===
Sommer was under house arrest at his home in Peachland, British Columbia, while waiting for an extradition hearing. He was released on bail September 17, 2006 after a short hearing. During the hearing his lawyer argued successfully that Sommer was a resident of Canada (even in light of his three-year assignment to the United States military) and that his involvement with the United States military was "like being a professional athlete, traveling and operating abroad." With the success of this argument, Chief Justice Dohm placed the onus on the Crown, which failed to prove a valid reason for his incarceration pending his extradition hearing. Sommer eventually agreed to return to the United States and plead guilty.

=== Media attention ===
Sommer received significant media attention in 2006 after revealing his robbery role in an interview with Seattle Weekly. He was interviewed by a variety of television, radio and print outlets, including National Public Radio, National Post, Rolling Stone, Seattle Times, and New York Times. This attention stemmed from his Ranger background, his assertion that the AK-47 assault rifles used in the robbery were smuggled back from Iraq, and his charge that his alleged involvement, if proven, was actually an effort to draw public attention to his allegations that Task Force 6-26, a unit he was assigned to during his time overseas, was involved in war crimes. These accounts confirmed that United States Special Operations Command (SOCOM) has been interacting with him, and a portion of a recorded call was played on National Public Radio in which a SOCOM officer admits that officers of the rank of brigadier general and above had been briefed and were concerned. However, in December 2006, the Seattle Times reported that the United States Army Criminal Investigation Division (CID) released a statement alleging that Sommer's war crimes allegations were investigated and found to be unsubstantiated. The calls between Sommer and SOCOM, in which the officer states the command’s interest, occur after the CID statement was released.

=== Political defense ===
The strategy behind Sommer's extradition fight asserts that if he was involved in the robbery, the robbery was a form of political protest to draw attention to the Task Force 6-26 war crimes allegations. The belief was that Canadian authorities would not extradite Sommer for what his defense claimed is a "political" crime. U.S. attorneys arguing for Sommer's extradition claimed there was no political motive for the robbery. Rather, the money stolen in the robbery was intended to create a motorcycle gang that would rival the motorcycle gangs controlling crime in the American Pacific Northwest and Canadian British Columbia, primarily the Hells Angels. Sommer contended however that the US had an ulterior motive in promoting the organized crime element of their story, claiming that the accusations may be an attempt to elicit interest in him by the Hells Angels.

=== Accomplices ===
All of the other defendants in the case entered guilty pleas in 2006. Twenty-two-year-old Chad Palmer was sentenced to 11 years in prison on December 16, 2008. Tigra Robertson was sentenced to 12 and a half years in prison on February 20, 2009. Alex Blum was sentenced on March 6, 2009 to time served (16 months). Nathan Dunmall was sentenced to 10 years in prison on March 20, 2009. Scott Byrne, who assisted in planning the heist, was sentenced to eight months.
