= Roxanna Brown =

American art historian

Roxanna Maude Brown (May 2, 1946 – May 14, 2008) was a prominent authority on Southeast Asian ceramics and director of the Bangkok University's Southeast Asian Ceramics Museum. Her research of Ming Dynasty ceramics greatly improved knowledge of trade in China and surrounding areas. She also often assisted the US government in investigating art smuggling, but she herself was implicated in art fraud in 2008. She was arrested for wire fraud and died in prison several days later. After facing a medical malpractice suit, the Federal Bureau of Prisons settled with her family in 2009.

== Biography ==
Brown was born on a farm in Illinois, United States, and received a bachelor's degree from Columbia University in 1968. She then became a journalist in South Vietnam, where her brother was serving in the U.S. Army during the Vietnam War. Interested in Asian art, she earned a master's degree from University of Singapore in 1973. She married and made her home in Bangkok, but she was run over and nearly killed in a traffic accident in the 1980s, which cost her a leg and seriously damaged her hearing. Nevertheless, in 2004, she received a Ph.D. from UCLA, working on the so-called Ming Gap, a 300-year interval when China blocked exports of ceramics. A production boom across Southeast Asia resulted. Brown's analysis of ceramics recovered from shipwrecks of the period "revolutionized the understanding of trade patterns in the region," according to colleagues cited in the Los Angeles Times.

=== Arrest and death ===
While employed as a curator by Bangkok University, she became involved in the investigation of the smuggling of art objects from Thailand to the United States, particularly from the Ban Chiang cultural tradition, assisting U.S. government agents. However, she was herself implicated in the possible false authentication of stolen objects, based on material found during January 2008 raids on the Los Angeles County Museum of Art, the Pacific Asia Museum in Pasadena, California, the Bowers Museum in Santa Ana, California, and the Mingei International Museum in San Diego. Emails and records were discovered that alleged Brown had offered to sell Thai antiquities to the smuggling ring. She was also accused of signing false appraisals of antiquities, enabling them to be sold for an inflated price. Brown was arrested on May 9, 2008, for alleged wire fraud when she arrived in the United States to deliver a lecture at an Asian art symposium at the University of Washington. In her initial interview, Brown denied selling any objects or providing false appraisals. When presented with evidence, Brown said she had forgotten that she had been paid $14,000 payment for antiquities, and admitted signing blank appraisals.

She was found dead in her cell at the Federal Detention Center in SeaTac on May 14. The charge was dropped immediately after her death at the facility. The question of her actual involvement in the smuggling ring, the justification for her arrest, and her lack of medical attention after it, was the subject of a series of articles in the Los Angeles Times.

=== Medical malpractice lawsuit ===
A medical malpractice lawsuit was filed by her son, Taweesin (Jaime) Ngerntongdee, after it was determined that Brown had died of peritonitis caused by a perforated ulcer. The suit claimed she had suffered stomach problems in the detention center and that other inmates took her to a shower after a guard would not respond when she vomited something that "smelled like excrement." When Brown requested for help after the 10 p.m. lockdown on May 13, the guard told her she would have to wait until the morning for medical attention, according to the suit. Detention center officials acknowledged there was no overnight medical staff on duty and took the case to mediation. The federal government settled the case for $880,000 in July 2009. Attorney Tim Ford stated part of the settlement stipulated that Brown's death would be investigated by the Federal Bureau of Prisons.

== Books ==
She was author of a number of academic books on Southeast Asian ceramics. Among the ones that established her early reputation are:

- Brown, Roxanna M. The Ceramics of South-East Asia: Their Dating and Identification. Oxford in Asia studies in ceramics. Kuala Lumpur: Oxford University Press, 1977.
- Brown, Roxanna M. "Guangdong Ceramics from Butuan and Other Philippine Sites: An Exhibition Catalogue." Makati, Metro Manila, Philippines: The Society, 1989.
- Brown, Roxanna. Ceramic Excavations in the Philippines A Talk Given to the Southeast Asian Ceramic Society. Singapore: Southeast Asian Ceramic Society, 1972.
- Brown, Roxanna M. "Legend and Reality: Early Ceramics from South-East Asia." Exhibition at the Fitzwilliam Museum, Cambridge, from January 17 Until February 26, 1978. Cambridge: Fitzwilliam Museum, 1978.
- Brown, Roxanna M. The Legacy of Phra Ruang: An Exhibition of Thai Ceramics and of Ancient Pottery from Ban Chieng, Wednesday, 12 June-Wednesday, 26 June 1974. London: Bluett & Sons, 1974.

Among her later works are:

- Brown, Roxanna M., and Sten Sjostrand. Maritime Archaeology and Shipwreck Ceramics in Malaysia. Kuala Lumpur, Malaysia: Published on the occasion of the exhibition Malaysian Maritime Archaeology by Dept. of Museums & Antiquities in collaboration with Nanhai Marine Archaeology Sdn. Bhd, 2001.
- Brown, Roxanna M., and Sten Sjostrand. Turiang: A Fourteenth-Century Shipwreck in Southeast Asian Waters. Pasadena, CA: Pacific Asia Museum, 2000. ISBN 978-1-877921-17-9.
