= Colton Harris Moore =

American former fugitive (born 1991)

- Born: March 22, 1991 (age 35); Mount Vernon, Washington, U.S.
- Other names: "Barefoot Bandit" "Barefoot Burglar" (aliases); Colton A. Harris, Colton A. Harris Molton, Colton Harris, Colton Moore, Colton A Burgess, Colton A. Moore, Colton Kohler
- Known for: Burglary
- Height: 6 ft (1.8 m)
- Parent(s): Gordon Moore; Pamela A. Kohler (nee Harris)
- Status: Pled guilty to state and federal charges, sentenced in Jan. 2012 to 6 and a half years on federal charges, sentenced in Dec. 2011 to a concurrent term of over seven years for the state charges.
- Criminal charges: "Interstate Transportation of A Stolen Aircraft", "Interstate Transportation of A Stolen Boat", "Piloting An Aircraft Without a Valid Airman's Certificate", "Attempt to Elude", "Illegal Landing" (Landing an airplane in the Bahamas)

Colton Harris Moore (born March 22, 1991) is a former American fugitive. He was charged with the theft of hundreds of thousands of dollars in property, including several small aircraft, boats, and multiple cars, all committed while still a teenager.

He fled to the Bahamas on July 4, 2010, in a plane that he stole from an airport in Bloomington, Indiana. He was indicted on July 6, 2010, by a U.S. Federal Court in Seattle, Washington, on charges of transporting another stolen aircraft in that state. Moore, still only 19, was arrested in Harbour Island, Bahamas, on July 11, 2010, after police shot out the engine of the boat in which he was attempting to flee. Two days later, he was extradited from Nassau, Bahamas, to Miami, Florida, and transferred on July 21 to the Federal Detention Center, SeaTac in Washington. On December 16, 2011, Moore was sentenced to more than seven years in prison for dozens of consolidated charges brought against him from three different counties. On January 27, 2012, he was sentenced to six and a half years for related federal crimes.

He became known as the "Barefoot Bandit" by reportedly committing some of his crimes barefoot, once leaving behind 39 chalk footprints and the word "CYA!." Despite the widely reported nickname, officials said that he more often wore shoes.

On September 28, 2016, Moore was released from prison on parole.

== Background ==
Colton Harris Moore was born in Mount Vernon, Washington and grew up in his mother's house on Camano Island. Neighbors said they made several calls to Child Protective Services, believing he was neglected or abused. His father, Gordon, used drugs and was in prison while Moore was a toddler. When he was twelve years old, his father (who had recently been released) walked into the woods after an argument at a family barbecue, was subsequently arrested and not heard from again. According to his mother, Pamela Kohler, his stepfather died when he was about seven years old, and from the time Moore was in the first grade, she knew there was "something off about him" – "sort of a disconnection". He would not listen to his teachers, started altercations at school, and would sometimes deliberately break things around the house. According to a court-ordered psychiatric evaluation, Moore said that his mother drank and became mean, breaking his possessions.

Colton started living in the wild at the age of seven, and would break into vacation homes in the area, stealing blankets, food and water before disappearing into the forest for days. His first conviction for stolen property came at age 12, and by the time he was 13, he had three more. He has been diagnosed with depression, attention deficit disorder and intermittent explosive disorder. Each conviction brought a 10-day stay in a detention center, or community service. His mother once said, "Every time he had anything any good, everyone thought he stole it. What does that do to a kid?" In 2003, police found a neighbor's camcorder in his home. Never before sentenced to more than a month, he was given a three-year juvenile sentence and was housed at the Green Hill School in Chehalis. He was transferred to a halfway house in Renton where he fled by walking out of the facility in April 2008.

== Suspected offenses ==
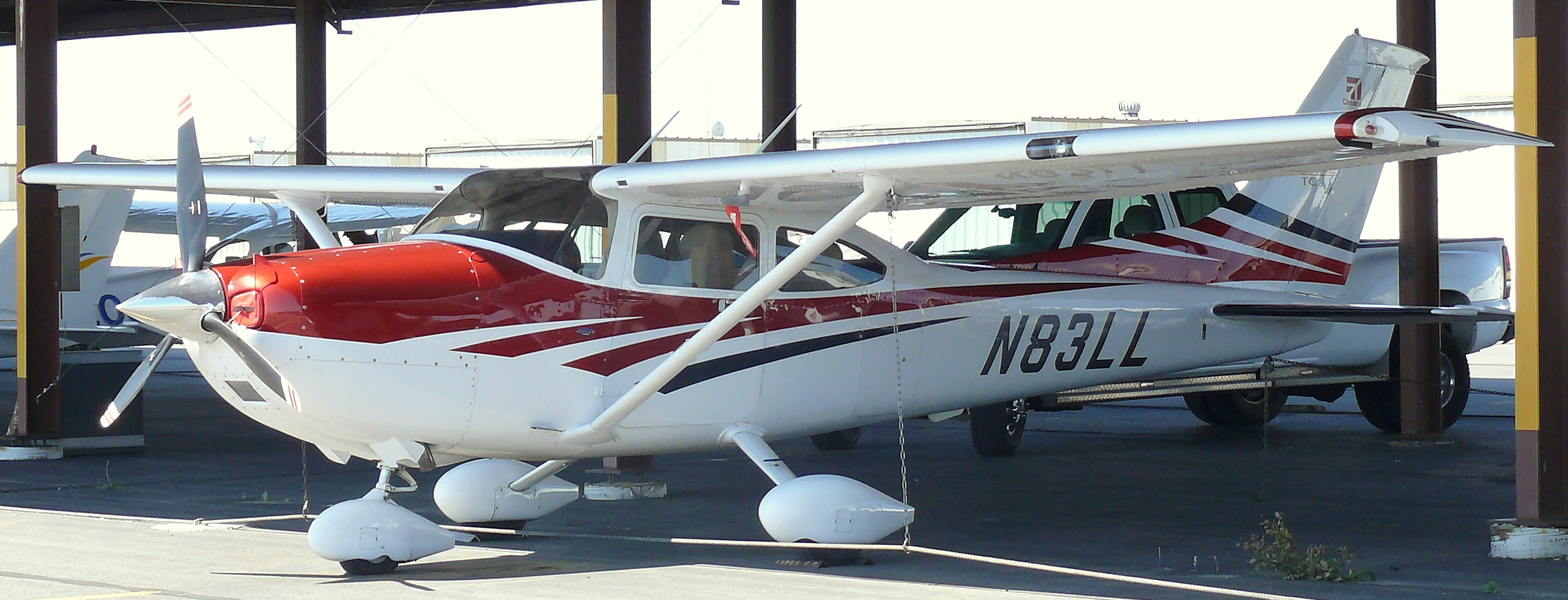
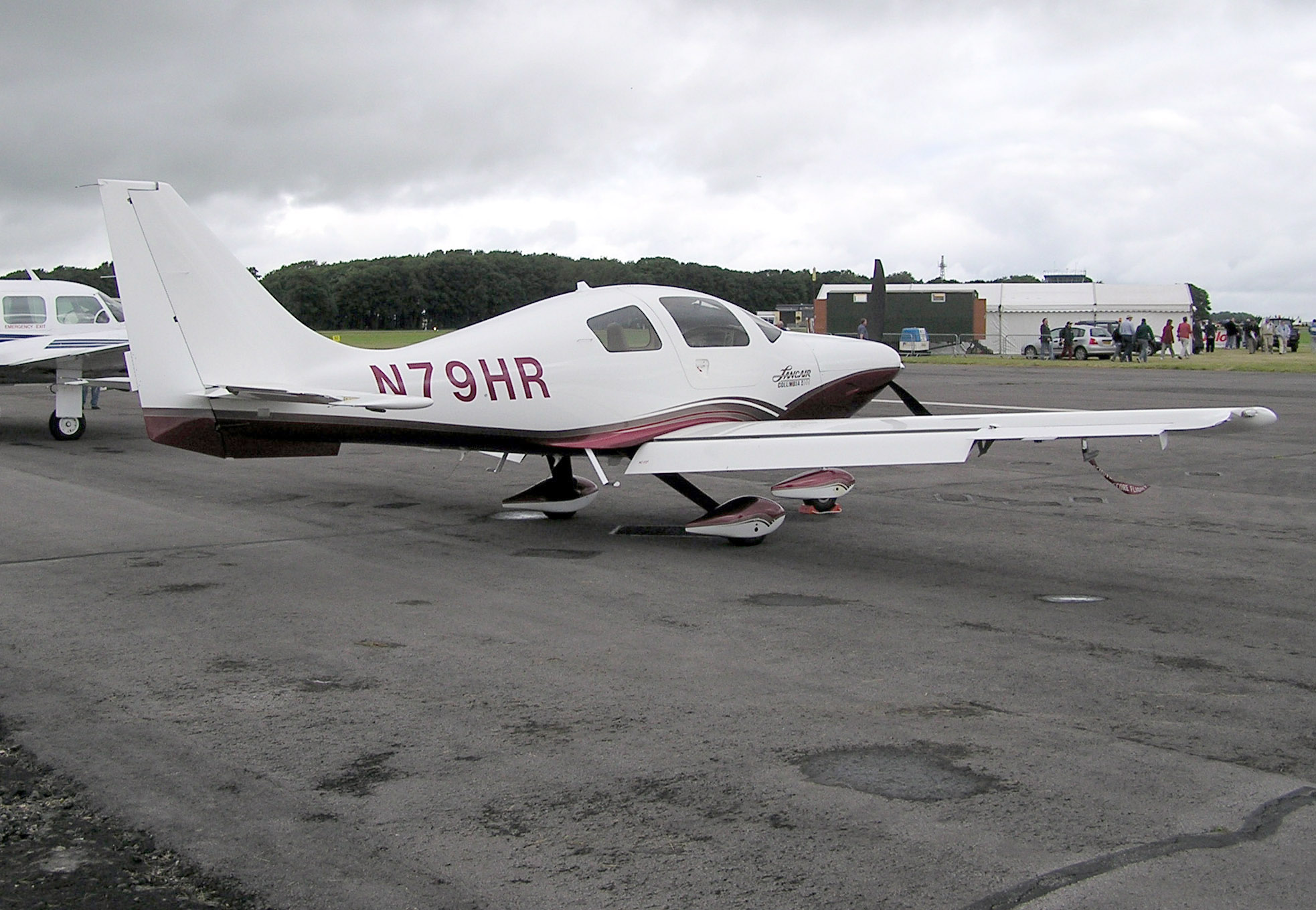
A Cessna 182T (top) and Cessna 400 (bottom), similar to airplanes allegedly stolen by Moore.

Moore is suspected of being responsible for approximately 100 thefts in Washington, Idaho, and Canada, including bicycles, automobiles, light aircraft, and speedboats. It is believed that he learned how to fly small planes by reading aircraft manuals, handbooks, watching a "How to fly a small airplane" DVD, and playing flight simulator computer games. One plane he stole in November 2008 was a Cessna 182, FAA registration number N24658, belonging to then KZOK-FM radio personality Bob Rivers, valued at over $150,000. The plane was later recovered from a Yakama Indian Reservation crash site. Though badly damaged, it was rebuilt and is in Florida.

According to local sheriffs, Moore would often slip into a home just to soak in a hot bath or steal ice cream from the freezer. While his thefts would escalate to increasing value in cash and property, he initially would steal only what he needed for living in the woods as a survivalist. In 2009, he allegedly used a homeowner's computer and credit card to order bear mace and a pair of $6,500 night vision goggles.

On May 30, 2010, police found a handwritten note and $100 at a veterinary clinic in Raymond, Washington, approximately 95 miles (150 km) southwest of Seattle. The note read:

Drove by, had some extra cash. Please use this money for the care of animals

— Colton Harris Moore, (AKA: "The Barefoot Bandit"), Camano Island, WA.

In late June 2010, Moore was suspected of vehicle thefts stretching as far east as Illinois. A trail of thefts attributed to him runs through Idaho, South Dakota, Nebraska, Iowa, and Illinois. Police found a 2008 white Toyota Sequoia in Norfolk, Nebraska, which was reported stolen in Yankton, South Dakota. Later that day, several burglaries were reported at Karl Stefan Memorial Airport, located 1 mile (2 km) south of where the SUV was abandoned. A truck owned by the town of Ottumwa, Iowa, was later recovered in Dallas City, Illinois. On July 4, 2010, a Cessna 400 single-engine plane was reported stolen from the Bloomington, Indiana, airport. It was later found crashed in the shoreline waters of Great Abaco Island in the Bahamas, again leading to speculation that Moore was responsible. Shortly afterward, there were several break-ins reported across the island.

On July 6, 2010, an indictment was released from a federal judge of the U.S. District Court of Western Washington, which was originally filed in December 2009. This indictment cites Moore for interstate transport of stolen property/airplane theft, related to a plane stolen from Bonners Ferry, Idaho that crashed outside of Granite Falls, Washington. The FBI placed a $10,000 bounty for information leading to his arrest, and federal agents believed that he was responsible for the recent Indiana theft.

=== Capture ===
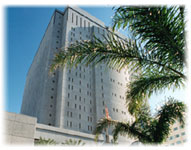
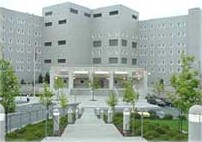
After being captured, Harris Moore spent his time in the United States federal detention centers in Miami (top) and SeaTac (bottom).

On July 11, 2010, Moore was captured just before dawn at Harbour Island, Bahamas. Local officers picked up his trail in Eleuthera after recovering a 44-foot (13-meter) power boat stolen from a marina on Great Abaco. A police official said the suspect attempted to flee, but police shot out the engine on his stolen boat. Before being arrested, Moore threw his portable computer into the water and put a gun to his head, but the police talked him out of killing himself. He told the police that he intended to go to Cuba to throw authorities off his trail and from there to the Turks and Caicos Islands. His mother had hoped that he would flee to a country that did not have an extradition treaty with the United States.

In March 2011, FBI Special Agent Fred Gutt confirmed the reward fund payout: "The $10,000 bounty money was paid out to people directly involved in (Moore's) capture." The reward money was split among Jordan Sackett, Capt. Ronald Billiot, Capt. Patrick Young, Capt. Ben Johnson and Kenny Strachan, a security guard at the Romora Bay Resort.

== Criminal proceedings ==
Moore pleaded guilty on July 13, 2010, to illegal entry to the Bahamas and illegally landing a plane. He was sentenced to three months in jail or a $300 fine. His mother wired the money to the U.S. Embassy in Nassau, which in turn paid the fine. He was deported the same day via overnight commercial flight, accompanied by Bahamian authorities and United States agents of the FBI to Miami, Florida. On July 14, Moore appeared before U.S. Magistrate Robert Dube to determine his legal representation, which had been hired on his behalf by his mother.

In a hearing on July 16, 2010, in the U.S. District Court of Southern Florida, Judge Dube ruled that Moore would be sent to Washington state to face charges there first because he was arrested under their warrant. Moore waived his right to an extradition hearing. He was held at the Federal Detention Center in Miami until July 21, when he was transferred by the Justice Prisoner and Alien Transportation System to the Federal Detention Center in SeaTac, Washington. He was required to wear handcuffs and leg irons while being transported to Washington. A federal judge at the U.S. District Court of Western Washington in Seattle set a November 15 deadline for prosecutors to have Moore formally indicted by a federal grand jury. However, Moore waived his right to a speedy trial, permitting both the defense and the prosecution more time to prepare for the case. On November 18, 2010, Moore pleaded not guilty in federal court to charges of interstate transportation of a stolen plane, boat and gun, and of being a fugitive in possession of a firearm and flying a plane without a pilot's license.

On September 30, 2010, Harley Davidson Ironwing, a self-described associate of Moore's burglaries, pleaded guilty to assault and was sentenced to 18 months in prison.

On June 17, 2011, federal prosecutors recommended that Moore be sentenced to six years in prison. Moore pleaded guilty to all seven counts on the federal indictment. He was exposed to up to 10 years in prison in state court, however, for a break-in and burglary near Granite Falls, Washington.

At sentencing, prosecutors were expected to ask for a term of 9½ years, while Moore's attorneys, John Henry Browne and Emma Scanlan, were expected to ask for a 6-year term, citing psychiatric and mitigation reports describing his bleak childhood.

On December 16, 2011, Moore was sentenced in Island County court to more than seven years in prison. Superior Court Judge Vickie Churchill stated, "This case is a tragedy in many ways, but it's a triumph of the human spirit in other ways." Describing Moore's childhood as a "mind numbing absence of hope", she stated the 20-year-old was genuinely remorseful for his crimes. Moore said that he planned to spend his time in prison studying in preparation for applying to college in order to earn a degree in aeronautical engineering.

On January 27, 2012, Judge Richard Jones of Federal District Court in Seattle sentenced Moore to six and a half years in prison for his infamous international crime spree. During sentencing Moore addressed the court and U.S. Judge Richard Jones, saying that it is "no stretch of the imagination to say that I'm lucky to be alive." His sentence joined his federal time with his state prison time.

In July 2016, Moore was released on probation to a halfway house near Seattle. Moore reportedly secured a job at his defense attorney's Seattle law firm, doing "low-level clerical work". His efforts to raise money via social media to fund flight school training were vetoed by his parole officer, who said any money raised must go toward the $129,000 in restitution owed to his victims.

== "Barefoot Bandit" ==
Moore became known as the "Barefoot Bandit" or as the "Barefoot Burglar", for reportedly committing some of his crimes while barefoot. In fall 2009, police found footprints at an airport hangar in Bonners Ferry, Idaho; a Cessna 182 stolen from there crash-landed approximately 260 miles (420 km) to the west near Granite Falls, Washington, after a few unsuccessful attempts to land at the small airport there. Police in the San Juan Islands also found cartoonish, chalk outlines of feet drawn upon the floor of a grocery store that was broken into in February 2010. Moore became an internet sensation with a Facebook fan page drawing about 60,000 members. A local Seattle man started selling T-shirts bearing Moore's picture with the words "Momma Tried". Local people from Camano Island also attempted to vent their frustrations through a song, as well as a blog which included the sale of merchandise and accepted donations to purchase the services of a bounty hunter.

In April 2010, 20th Century Fox purchased the film rights to the book The Barefoot Bandit: The True Tale of Colton Harris-Moore, New American Outlaw, by Bob Friel. Moore's mother retained celebrity lawyer Yale Lewis to seek control of entertainment interests related to her son. She also hired John Henry Browne to handle her son's criminal defense. Under a plea deal Moore agreed to forfeit any profits from selling publishing rights to his story.

The Barefoot Bandit Documentary (which premiered at Friday Harbor Film Festival on November 7, 2014, filmmaker Carly Bodmer) explores the childhood and time that Moore spent evading the law. Pam Kohler (Colton's mother), the FBI, lawyer John Henry Browne, and a range of personalities from Moore's hometown to the Bahamas piece together why he did what he did.

A 2014 Canadian documentary about Moore called Fly Colt Fly: Legend of the Barefoot Bandit was made by brothers Adam and Andrew Gray, showing how the mythic story evolved in the media and how Moore became a 21st century outlaw folk hero.
