= Southeast Asian Ceramics Museum =

Museum in Bangkok University, Pathum Thani, Thailand

Coordinates: 14.039044°N 100.616049°E

The Southeast Asian Ceramics Museum (Thai: พิพิธภัณฑสถานเครื่องถ้วยเอเชียตะวันออกเฉียงใต้) is a history museum in Bangkok University, Pathum Thani, Thailand, displaying Southeast Asian ceramics.

The museum opened to the public on 11 May 2005. Princess Maha Chaki Sirindhorn presided over the official inauguration of the museum on 20 November 2009. It exhibits ancient ceramic production in Thailand and other Asian ceramics. This includes around 500 ceramic pieces selected from a permanent collection of about 15,000 objects. The core of the collection was donated by Surat Osathanugrah, who also founded Bangkok University. He was supported by Roxanna Brown, who then became the museum's first director.

While many of the ceramics in the collection originate from other countries, most were collected in Thailand. The collection includes ceramics from China, Vietnam, and Burma, as well as from Thailand. The collection also includes Khmer ceramics, mostly from the Phnom Dongrek kilns in Thailand and the Phnom Kulen kilns in the Cambodia. The museum has the largest generally accessible collection of ceramics from the Tak-Omkoi sites of western Thailand.

The museum is open from Monday to Friday, 10 a.m.-4 p.m., and closed on Saturday, Sunday, public holiday, and during the semester break periods of the university with free admission.

== See also ==
- Roxanna Brown
