= Settlements in Cameron Highlands =

Area in Pahang, Malaysia

ROAD TO CAMERON HIGHLANDS (TANAH RATA)
TOWN/CITY	DISTANCE	ACCESS
Alor Setar (Kedah)	326 km (203 mi).	Simpang Pulai
Gua Musang (Kelantan)	124 km (77 mi).	--
Hat Yai (Southern Thailand)	523 km (325 mi).	Simpang Pulai
Ipoh (Perak)	90 km (56 mi).	Simpang Pulai
Johor Bahru (Johor)	541 km (336 mi).	Tapah
Kangar (Perlis)	396 km (246 mi).	Simpang Pulai
Kota Bharu (Kelantan)	307 km (191 mi).	Gua Musang
Kuala Lipis (Pahang)	135 km (84 mi).	Sungai Koyan
Kuala Lumpur	205 km (127 mi).	Tapah
Kuala Terengganu	335 km (208 mi).	Gua Musang
Kuantan (Pahang)	373 km (232 mi).	Sungai Koyan
Malacca City (Malacca)	385 km (239 mi).	Tapah
Penang (George Town)	247 km (153 mi).	Simpang Pulai
Raub (Pahang)	146 km (91 mi).	Sungai Koyan
Seremban (Negri Sembilan)	385 km (239 mi).	Tapah
Shah Alam (Selangor)	205 km (127 mi).	Tapah
Simpang Pulai (Perak)	80 km (50 mi).	--
Singapore	561 km (349 mi).	Tapah
Sungai Koyan (Pahang)	96 km (60 mi).	--
Tapah (Perak)	56.6 km (35.2 mi).	--

Cameron Highlands is an area in Pahang, Malaysia. It has three major towns: Ringlet, Tanah Rata and Brinchang. The Highlands have five settlements: Bertam Valley, Kea Farm, Tringkap, Kuala Terla, and Kampung Raja. These eight communities are linked by a 34-kilometer-long road that stretches from Ringlet to Kampung Raja.

ROAD TO TANAH RATA
OUTPOST	DISTANCE
Bertam Valley	14 km (8.7 mi).
Ringlet	12.7 km (7.9 mi).
Brinchang	5 km (3.1 mi).
Kea Farm	7.8 km (4.8 mi).
Tringkap	12 km (7.5 mi).
Kuala Terla	17.7 km (11.0 mi).
Kampung Raja	21.9 km (13.6 mi).

== Towns ==
=== Ringlet ===
Ringlet (1,100 metres (3,600 ft)) is the first town after the turnoff from Tapah. It is an agricultural hub. A wide variety of vegetables are grown there. The cool climate is favorable for growing passion fruit, strawberries and grapefruit.

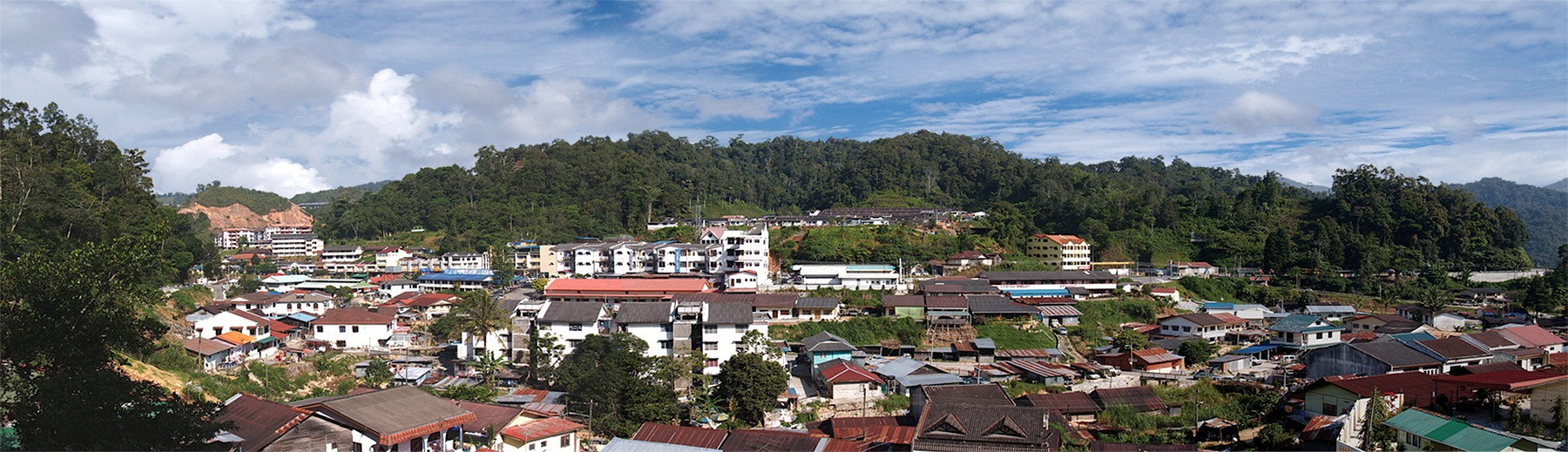
Ringlet (c. 2012)

=== Tanah Rata ===
Tanah Rata (1,400 metres (4,600 ft)) is the administrative center of the area. The police station, government offices, hospital, schools, library, post office, shops, banks, eateries, inns, chalets, bus station and taxi stand are all present. The town is noted for its intricate network of jungle tracks leading to waterfalls, mountains, scenic spots or aboriginal villages. These tracks generally intersect with each other to form a “loop” around the city.

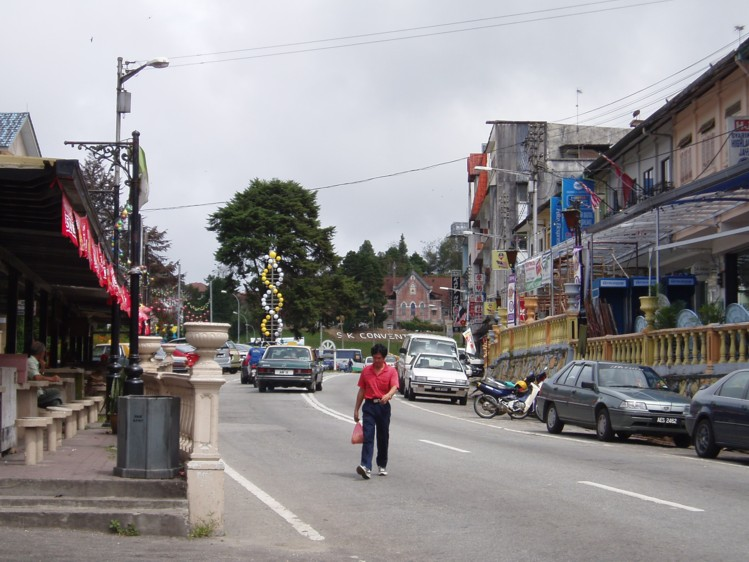
Tanah Rata (c. 2005)

=== Brinchang ===
Brinchang (1,450 metres (4,760 ft)) is the Highlands' second biggest town. The majority of its visitors are from Singapore or Malaysia. It is close to the central market, orchards, nurseries, museum and a golf course. Brinchang is also known for its “Night Market," an outdoor bazaar typically open on weekends and during school holidays.

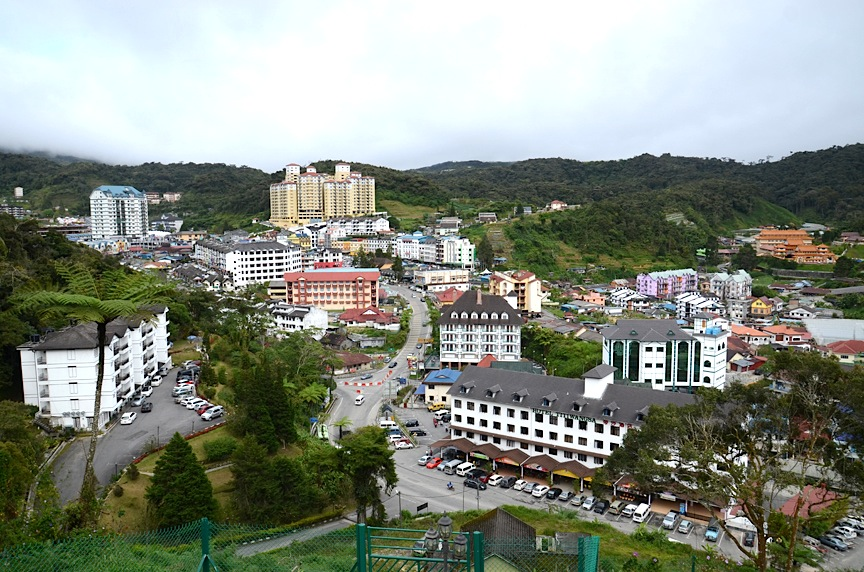
Brinchang (c. 2012)

== Attractions ==
Bertam Valley is a scenic spot about two kilometers from Ringlet. Its main activity is the cultivation of fruit, flowers and vegetables. It is the Highlands' entryway from Pahang via Sungei Koyan from Raub or Kuala Lipis.

Kea Farm (1,600 metres (5,200 ft)) is one of the highest villages in Peninsular Malaysia. It is adjacent to the tea estates and Mount Batu Brinchang (Malay: Gunung Batu Brinchang).

Tringkap is a farming enclave and is the area's focal point for growing vegetables. A high percentage of its crops are grown on terraces and the bulk of its production is exported to Singapore.

Kuala Terla is a farming commune. Its main activity is the cultivation of fruits, flowers and vegetables. It is approximately four kilometers from Kampung Raja. It has a mixed population including Chinese, Indians and Malays; however, the most common language spoken is Malay.

Kampung Raja is a residential area and the first town after the turnoff from Simpang Pulai. From Kampung Raja, it is possible to proceed to either Ipoh (Perak) or Gua Musang (Kelantan).
