= Malaysia Federal Route 59 =

Road in Malaysia

Federal Route 59
- Jalan Tapah–Cameron Highlands
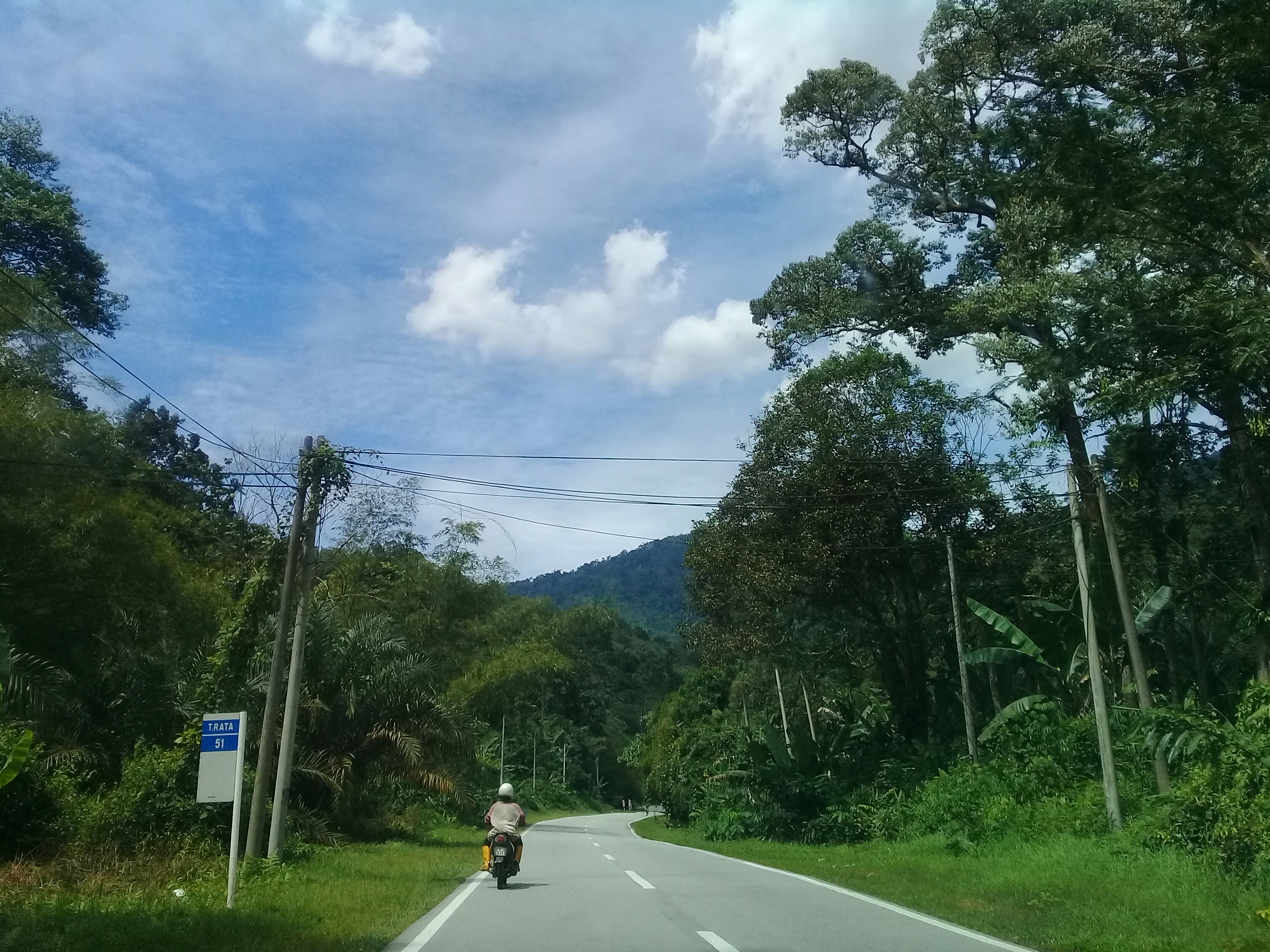

Route information
- Maintained by Malaysian Public Works Department
- Length: 89.85 km (55.83 mi)
- Existed: 1920s–present

Major junctions
- Southwest end: Tapah, Perak
- FT 1 Federal Route 1 North–South Expressway Northern Route / AH2; FT 102 Federal Route 102; C162 State Route C162; FT 434 Federal Route 434; FT 432 Federal Route 432; C7 State Route C7; FT 185 Second East–West Highway
- Northeast end: Cameron Highlands, Pahang

Location
- Country: Malaysia
- Primary destinations: Brinchang, Tanah Rata, Ringlet, Kea Farm, Tringkap, Kuala Terla

Highway system
- Highways in Malaysia; Expressways; Federal; State

Federal Route 59, or Jalan Tapah–Cameron Highlands, is a 90 km (56 mi) federal road in Perak and Pahang state, Malaysia. It was the main route to Cameron Highlands, Pahang from Tapah, Perak, before the second route Second East–West Highway was built in 2001.

== Route background ==
The Kilometre Zero of the Federal Route 59 is located at Tapah, Perak, at its interchange with the Federal Route 1, the main trunk road of the centre of Peninsular Malaysia. The Kilometre Zero monument is erected near the Pos Malaysia post office at Jalan Stesen, Tapah.

== History ==
The Cameron Highlands were explored in 1885 by William Cameron, a British surveyor. The trail used by Cameron remained unchanged until the 1920s when the British colonial Federated Malay States (FMS) government upgrades from trail road to a two-lane road.

Along the road, there are many scenic views and tourist attractions. Due to the increase in the number of tourists to Cameron Highlands in recent years and with virtually no upgrades to the existing road, traffic congestion occurs daily, sometimes up to 5 hours, particularly from Tanah Rata to Kea Farm. A large reason for the increase in traffic congestion can be attributed to the relatively single lane narrow road leading to the Sungei Palas BOH Tea Factory and Tea Garden, where cars have to adopt a stop-and-go method to avoid collisions.

== Features ==
- Narrow roads (JKR R3 (mountainous)) standard for the most section with a maximum speed limit of 40 km/h)
- Kuala Woh waterfall
- Orang Asli villages
- Kuala Woh and Lata Iskandar waterfalls
- A daily day-night market at Brinchang town and Kea Farm but has been moved to Golden Hills and operates during the weekends only
- Connects to Federal Route 432 Jalan Gunung Brinchang, the highest paved road in Malaysia.
- Tapah Interchange, a major interchange of the North–South Expressway Northern Route

At most sections, the Federal Route 59 was built under the JKR R5 road standard, allowing maximum speed limit of up to 90 km/h (56 mph).

== Upgrading from Tapah to Cameron Highlands ==
A multi-million ringgit project to widen and upgrade the road from Tapah to the highlands has been proposed. Motorists prefer to use the road from Simpang Pulai in Ipoh rather than the winding road up from Tapah. The 40 km stretch from Kampung Pahang here is regularly used by lorries carrying vegetables from the highlands to the rest of the country and Singapore. During peak days, the road is heavily congested. Motorists dread driving along the road, especially during the rainy season, as it is landslide-prone.

== Junction lists ==
Legend:

- I/C - Interchange, I/S - Intersection, RSA - Rest and service area, OBR - Overhead bridge restaurant, R/R - Restaurant and rest plaza, L/B - Layby, V/P - Vista point, TN - tunnel, T/P - Toll plaza, BR - Bridge
- C - Cloverleaf, S - Stack, T-A - Trumpet-A, T-B - Trumpet-B, DT - Directional-T/Y, SDT - Semi-Directional-T/Y, P-Y - Partial-Y, D - Diamond, P-C - Partial cloverleaf, D-D - Diverging diamond, D-R - Direct ramp

State	District	Location	km	mi	Name	Destinations	Notes
Perak	Batang Padang	Tapah	0.0	0.0	Tapah	FT 1 Malaysia Federal Route 1 – Ipoh, Gopeng, Kampar, Tapah Hospital, Bidor, Slim River, Tanjung Malim, Kuala Lumpur; A10 Perak State Route A10 – Tapah Road, Chikus, Pasir Salak, Teluk Intan	Junctions
Perak	Batang Padang	Tapah			Tapah; Taman Tapah	Jalan Taman Tapah – Taman Tapah	T-junctions
Perak	Batang Padang	Tapah			Tapah; Taman Anson	Jalan Taman Anson – Taman Anson	T-junctions
Perak	Batang Padang	Tapah			Tapah-NSE	North–South Expressway Northern Route / AH2 – Alor Setar, Ipoh, Gopeng, Bidor, Tanjung Malim, Kuala Lumpur	T-junctions
Perak	Batang Padang	Tapah			Kampung Pahang; 71m above sea level		
Perak	Batang Padang	Tapah			Kem Tapah; Tapah Royal Malay Regiment Camp		
Perak	Batang Padang	Tapah			SESTA	Sekolah Menengah Sains Tapah (SESTA)	
Perak	Batang Padang	Tapah			Jalan Sungai Cherok	A103 Perak State Route A103 – Sungai Cherok	T-junctions
Perak	Batang Padang	Tapah			Kampung Batu Tiga; 80m above sea level		
Perak	Batang Padang	Tapah			Sungai Cherok bridge 89m above sea level		
Perak	Batang Padang	Tapah			Kampung Batu Melintang; 120m above sea level		
Perak	Batang Padang	Tapah			Kampung Batu Enam; 139m above sea level		
Perak	Batang Padang	Tapah			Pusat Ternakan Ikan Air Tawar Tapah; 145m above sea level		
Perak	Batang Padang	Tapah			Kuala Woh; 166m above sea level	Jalan Kuala Woh – Kuala Woh, Kuala Woh Waterfalls, Sultan Idris Woh Dam and Hydroelectric Station	T-junctions
Perak	Batang Padang	Tapah			Sungai Woh bridge		
Perak	Batang Padang	Tapah			Start/End of narrow roads Max speed limit: 40 km/h		
Perak	Batang Padang	Tapah			Kampung Batu Tujuh; 166m above sea level		
Perak	Batang Padang	Tapah			Kampung Batu Lapan; 216m above sea level		
Perak	Batang Padang	Tapah			Kampung Batu Sembilan; 250m above sea level		
Perak	Batang Padang	Tapah			Kampung Batu Sepuluh; 309m above sea level		
Perak	Batang Padang	Tapah			Kampung Batu Sebelas; 356m above sea level		
Perak	Batang Padang	Tapah			Orang Asli Village; 391m above sea level		
Perak	Batang Padang	Tapah			Kampung Batu Empat Belas; 432m above sea level		
Perak	Batang Padang	Tapah			Lata Iskandar Waterfalls; 473m above sea level	Lata Iskandar Waterfalls – Food and fruit stall	
Perak	Batang Padang	Tapah			Orang Asli Village; 516m above sea level		
Perak	Batang Padang	Tapah			Orang Asli Village; 509m above sea level		
Perak	Batang Padang	Tapah			Sultan Yusoff Jor Dam and Hydroelectric Station; 529m above sea level	Sultan Yusoff Jor Dam and Hydroelectric Station – Main Hydroelectric Dam, Sultan Yusoff Jor Dam Golf Course	T-junctions; Restricted area
Perak	Batang Padang	Tapah			Klinik Kesihatan Batu Tujuh Belas; 544m above sea level		
Perak	Batang Padang	Tapah			Orang Asli Village; 562m above sea level		
Perak	Batang Padang	Tapah			Kampung Batu Tujuh Belas; 564m above sea level		
Perak	Batang Padang	Tapah			Sungai Jor bridge 610m above sea level		
Perak	Batang Padang	Tapah			Sultan Yusoff Jor Dam and Hydroelectric Station; 610m above sea level	Sultan Yusoff Jor Dam and Hydroelectric Station – Main Intake, Tenaga Nasional (TNB) Staff Quarters	T-junctions; Restricted area
Perak	Batang Padang	Tapah			Orang Asli Village; 650m above sea level		
Perak	Batang Padang	Tapah			Viaduct --- m above sea level		
Perak	Batang Padang	Tapah			Orang Asli Village; 724m above sea level		
Perak	Batang Padang	Tapah			Orang Asli Village; 775m above sea level		
Perak	Batang Padang	Tapah			Orang Asli Village; 872m above sea level		
Perak–Pahang border					1200 m above sea level		
Pahang	Cameron Highlands	Ringlet			1200 m above sea level Start/End of narrow roads Max speed limit: 40 km/h		
Pahang	Cameron Highlands	Ringlet			Ringlet; 1127m above sea level		
Pahang	Cameron Highlands	Ringlet			Ringlet; Ringlet–Sungai Koyan Highway; 1131m above sea level	FT 102 Malaysia Federal Route 102 – Bertam Valley, Sungai Koyan, Kuala Lipis, Raub, Kuantan	T-junctions
Pahang	Cameron Highlands	Ringlet			Ringlet; 1134m above sea level		
Pahang	Cameron Highlands	Ringlet			Sungai Khazanah bridge 1117m above sea level		
Pahang	Cameron Highlands	Ringlet			SK Ringlet & SMK Ringlet; 1111m above sea level		
Pahang	Cameron Highlands	Ringlet			Sultan Abu Bakar Dam --- m above sea level		
Pahang	Cameron Highlands	Ringlet			Lakehouse Hotel; 1117m above sea level		
Pahang	Cameron Highlands	Ringlet			Sultan Abu Bakar Dam RSA – Food and Fruit Stalls		
Pahang	Cameron Highlands	Ringlet			Sungai Bertam bridge 1103m above sea level		
Pahang	Cameron Highlands	Ringlet			Habu; Habu Heights; 1105 m above sea level	Jalan Felicia – Habu Heights	T-junctions
Pahang	Cameron Highlands	Ringlet			Habu; 1102m above sea level	C162 Pahang State Route C162 – Boh Tea Estate, BOH Tea Factory, Visitor Centre, Tea Shop and Stall	T-junctions
Pahang	Cameron Highlands	Ringlet			Habu; Habu power station 1121m above sea level		
Pahang	Cameron Highlands	Ringlet			Food and Fruit Stalls; 1158m above sea level		
Pahang	Cameron Highlands	Ringlet			Kampung Batu 33; 1174m above sea level		
Pahang	Cameron Highlands	Ringlet–Tanah Rata			1387 m above sea level		
Pahang	Cameron Highlands	Tanah Rata			Cameron Valley Tea House 1; 1279m above sea level	Cameron Bharat Tea Estate – Tea Shop and Stall	
Pahang	Cameron Highlands	Tanah Rata			Cameron Valley Tea House 2; 1327m above sea level	Cameron Bharat Tea Estate – Tea Shop and Stall	
Pahang	Cameron Highlands	Tanah Rata			Jalan Mentiggi Utama; 1460m above sea level	Jalan Mentiggi Utama	
Pahang	Cameron Highlands	Tanah Rata			Tanah Rata; 1463m above sea level		
Pahang	Cameron Highlands	Tanah Rata			Tanah Rata; 1464m above sea level	Cameron Highlands Post Office	Post office opened on 1956; Historical site
Pahang	Cameron Highlands	Tanah Rata			Tanah Rata; 1465m above sea level	Cameron Highlands Bus and Taxi Station	
Pahang	Cameron Highlands	Tanah Rata			Tanah Rata; Jalan Dayang Indah; 1457m above sea level	Jalan Dayang Indah – Robinson Falls, Cameron Highlands District Council (MDCH) main headquarters, Cameron Highlands District and Land Office, Sultanah Hajjah Kalsom Hospital	T-junctions
Pahang	Cameron Highlands	Tanah Rata			Tanah Rata; Jalan Tengkolok; 1457m above sea level	Jalan Tengkolok	T-junctions
Pahang	Cameron Highlands	Tanah Rata			Tanah Rata; Jalan Masjid; 1457m above sea level	Jalan Masjid – Tanah Rata Park, Masjid Abu Bakar	T-junctions
Pahang	Cameron Highlands	Tanah Rata			Kampung Taman Sedia; 1493m above sea level		
Pahang	Cameron Highlands	Tanah Rata			Desa Anthurium Apartment; 1523m above sea level		
Pahang	Cameron Highlands	Tanah Rata			Jalan Kampung Parit; 1486m above sea level	C7 Jalan Kampung Parit – Kampung Parit, Parit Falls	T-junctions
Pahang	Cameron Highlands	Tanah Rata			Persiaran Golden Hills; 1490m above sea level	Persiaran Golden Hills – Golden Hills, Kampung Sungai Ruil, Jalan Tengkolok, Sungai Ruil Tea Stop	T-junctions
Pahang	Cameron Highlands	Tanah Rata			Sungai Ruil bridge 1490m above sea level		
Pahang	Cameron Highlands	Tanah Rata			Jalan Rumah Persekutuan; 1499m above sea level	Jalan Rumah Persekutuan – Cameron Highlands Federal Rest House Summit	T-junctions
Pahang	Cameron Highlands	Tanah Rata			Jalan Girdle --- m above sea level	Jalan Girdle (Girdle Road) – Cameron Green, Strawberry Park Resort, Strawberry shops	T-junctions
Pahang	Cameron Highlands	Tanah Rata			Cameron Highlands Sultan Ahmad Shah Golf Club; 1499m above sea level	Cameron Highlands Sultan Ahmad Shah Golf Club (Formerly known as Cameron Highlands Golf and Country Club)	
Pahang	Cameron Highlands	Tanah Rata-Brinchang			1450 m above sea level		
Pahang	Cameron Highlands	Brinchang			Jalan Kampung Parit --- m above sea level	C7 Pahang State Route C7 – Tanah Rata, Kampung Parit, Parit Falls	T-junctions
Pahang	Cameron Highlands	Brinchang			Brinchang; 1515m above sea level	Jalan Angsana; Jalan Pecah Batu	Junctions
Pahang	Cameron Highlands	Brinchang			Brinchang; 1520m above sea level	Brinchang Food Court	
Pahang	Cameron Highlands	Brinchang			Brinchang; 1534m above sea level	Brinchang Fire Station	
Pahang	Cameron Highlands	Brinchang			Brinchang; 1539m above sea level		
Pahang	Cameron Highlands	Brinchang			Brinchang; 1544m above sea level	Brinchang Police Station	
Pahang	Cameron Highlands	Brinchang			Uncle Sam Farm; 1583m above sea level	Uncle Sam Farm	T-junctions
Pahang	Cameron Highlands	Brinchang			Rose Garden; 1578m above sea level	Rose Garden	T-junctions
Pahang	Cameron Highlands	Brinchang			Brinchang Strawberry Park; 1576m above sea level	Brinchang Strawberry Park – Strawberry Park and Shoppe, Vegetable Market, Cameron Highlands Time Tunnel Gallery	
Pahang	Cameron Highlands	Brinchang			Sungai Janggus bridge 1601m above sea level		
Pahang	Cameron Highlands	Brinchang			S'Corner Market; 1600m above sea level	S Corner Market	
Pahang	Cameron Highlands	Brinchang			Cactus Point; 1614m above sea level	Cactus Point	T-junctions
Pahang	Cameron Highlands	Brinchang			Kea Farm Food Court; 1634m above sea level		
Pahang	Cameron Highlands	Brinchang			Kea Farm; 1634m above sea level	Kea Farm – Kea Farm daily day-night market	T-junctions
Pahang	Cameron Highlands	Brinchang			Copthorne Hotel Cameron Highlands; 1,627m above sea level	Copthorne Resort Cameron Highlands (Formerly known as Equatorial Hills Resort)	
Pahang	Cameron Highlands	Brinchang			Butterfly Garden; 1635m above sea level	Butterfly Garden	T-junctions
Pahang	Cameron Highlands	Brinchang			Jalan Gunung Brinchang; 1636m above sea level	FT 432 Malaysia Federal Route 432 – Mount Batu Brinchang, Orang Asli Village, Sungai Palas BOH Tea Estate	T-junctions
Pahang	Cameron Highlands	Brinchang			Persiaran Oriental Lily; 1487m above sea level		
Pahang	Cameron Highlands	Brinchang			Rose Valley; 1486m above sea level	Rose Valley	T-junctions
Pahang	Cameron Highlands	Brinchang			Tringkap; 1461m above sea level		
Pahang	Cameron Highlands	Brinchang			Blue Valley Tea Estate; 1458m above sea level	C7 Pahang State Route C7 – Blue Valley Tea Estate, Tea Shop and Stall	T-junctions
Pahang	Cameron Highlands	Brinchang			Cameron Lavender Garden; 1367m above sea level		
Pahang	Cameron Highlands	Brinchang			Kuala Terla; 1244m above sea level	Kuala Terla – Orang Asli Village	T-junctions
Pahang	Cameron Highlands	Brinchang			Kampung Raja; 1305m above sea level		
Pahang	Cameron Highlands	Brinchang	89.85	55.83	Cameron Highlands (North); Second East–West Highway; 1436m above sea level	FT 185 Second East–West Highway – Ipoh, Simpang Pulai, Gua Musang, Kuala Lipis, Kuala Krai, Kota Bharu, Kuala Berang, Kuala Terengganu; North–South Expressway Northern Route / AH2 – Alor Setar, Penang, Kuala Lumpur	T-junctions
1.000 mi = 1.609 km; 1.000 km = 0.621 mi: Incomplete access
