= Pahang State Route C162 =

Road in Malaysia

Pahang Route 162
- Jalan BOH

Major junctions
- West end: Habu
- FT 59 Federal Route 59
- East end: Bertam BOH tea estate

Location
- Country: Malaysia

Highway system
- Highways in Malaysia; Expressways; Federal; State

Jalan BOH (Pahang state route C162) is a major road in Cameron Highlands, Pahang, Malaysia.

== List of junctions ==
Km	Exit	Junctions	To	Remarks
		Habu	FT 59 Jalan Besar North; FT 59 Tanah Rata; FT 59 Brinchang; FT 1 Ipoh; FT 185 Gua Musang South; FT 59 Ringlet; FT 59 Tapah; North–South Expressway Northern Route AH2 Kuala Lumpur; FT 102 Kuala Lipis; FT 102 Raub; East Coast Expressway FT 2 Kuantan	T-junctions
		Kampung Habu		
Bertam Boh Tea Estate; Bertam BOH tea estate gate
		Bertam Boh Tea Estate	Bertam Boh Tea Estate; BOH Tea Factory; Visitor Centre, Tea Shop and Stall; V	
