= Kea Farm =

Settlement in Malaysia

Coordinates: 4°30′34″N 101°24′27.8″E

Kea Farm, at an altitude of 1,610 metres (5,282 ft) above sea level, is the highest located settlement in the Cameron Highlands and peninsular Malaysia. It is one of the most famous tourist spots in Cameron Highlands and is known for its stalls selling local produce, flowers and ornamental plants; butterfly farms and self-plucking strawberry farms. Kea Farm provides access to BOH Sungai Palas Tea Estate, the second highest mountain in Cameron Highlands, Gunung Brinchang (2,031 m) and the famed mossy forest of Mount Irau via Federal Route FT 432.

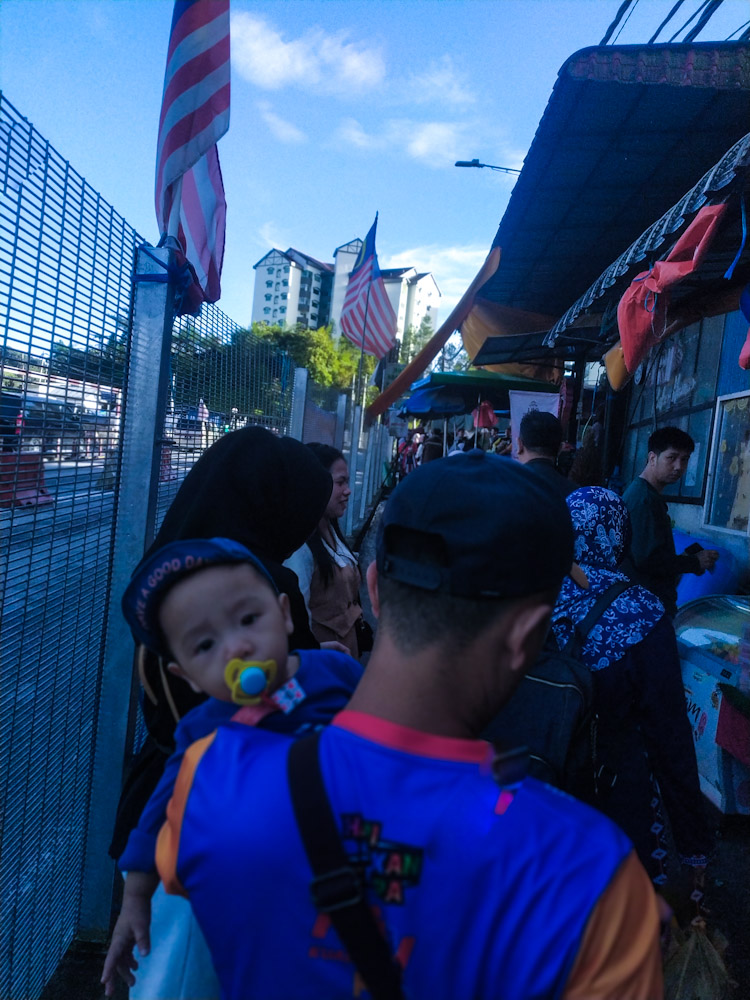
Kea Farm marketplace

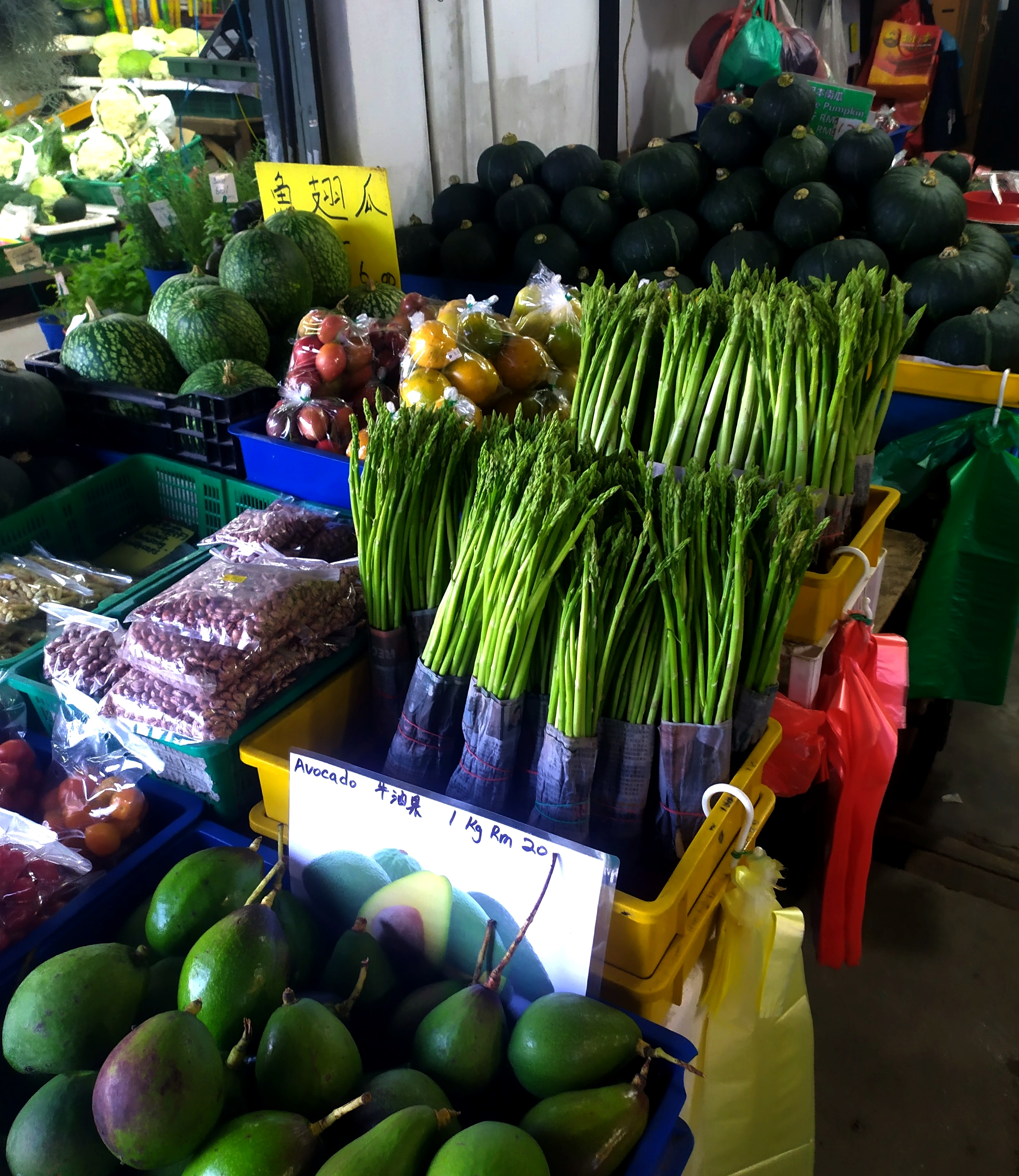
Fresh produce like avocados, asparagus and kabocha squash being sold in Kea Farm

== Transportation ==
Kea Farm is served by Federal Route FT 59, the main road that connects the major towns and settlements of Cameron Highlands.

== Accommodations ==
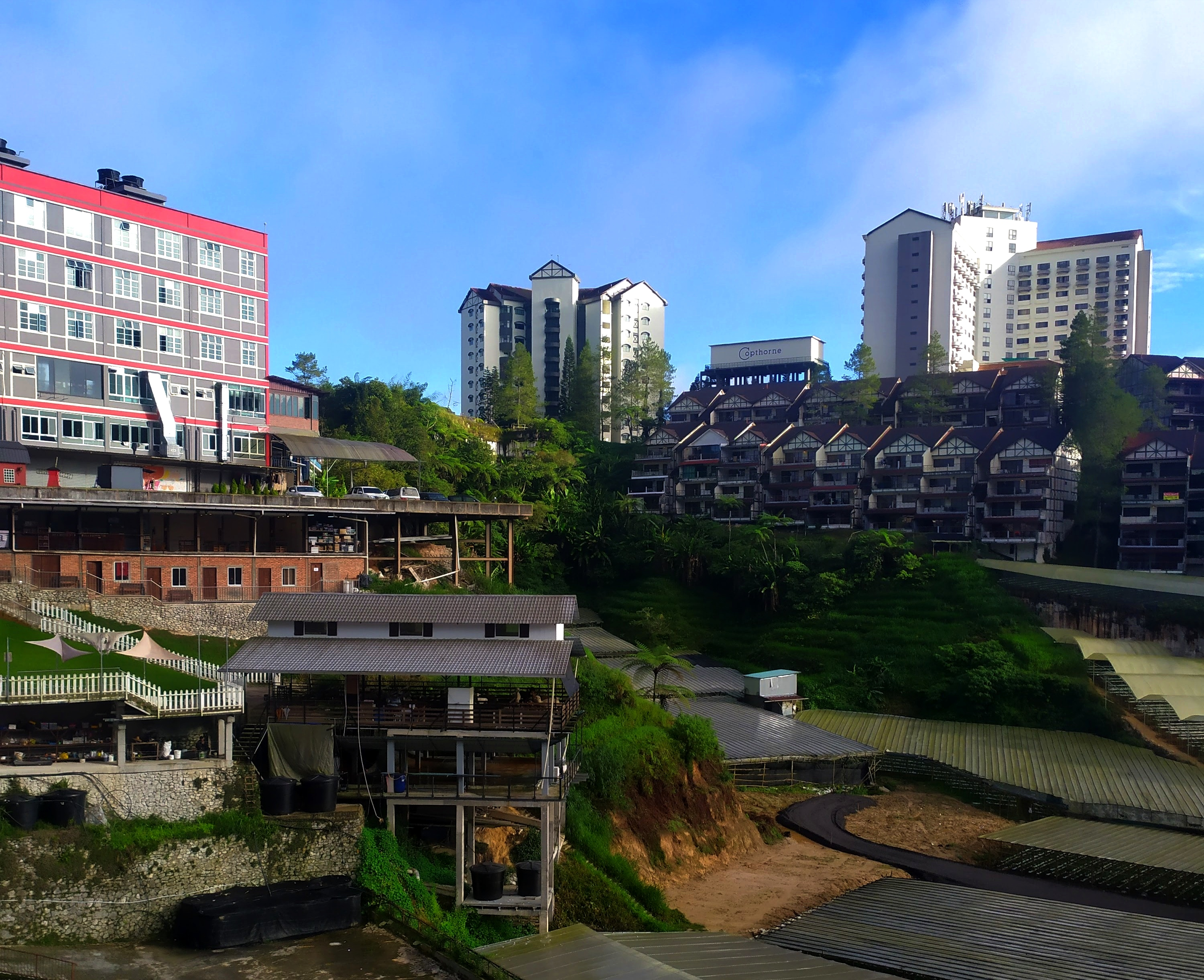
Hotel buildings in Kea Farm

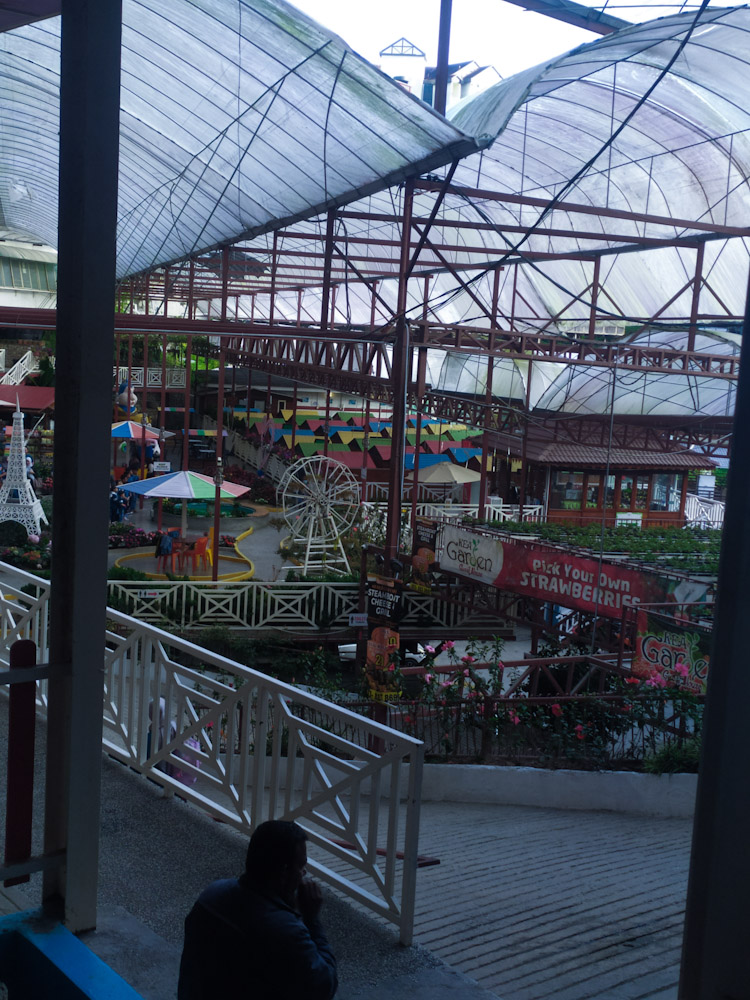
A hotel with a strawberry farm

The Copthorne Hotel, Equatorial Hotel, Kea Farm Guesthouse and Nova Highlands Resort and Residence are some accommodations located in Kea Farm.
