= Sekolah Menengah Sains Tapah =

- SESTA

Location
- Tapah, Perak Darul Ridzuan; Malaysia
- Coordinates: 4.218356692828896°N 101.28375861008779°E

Information
- Type: Boarding school,
- Motto: Malay: Berilmu Bertakwa (Knowledgeable and Faithful)
- Established: 11 April 2010
- School district: Batang Padang
- Authority: Malaysia Education Ministry (Division of Boarding School)
- Grades: Form 1 to Form 5 (standard Malaysian secondary school grades)
- Age range: 13-17
- Language: Malay, English, Arabic, Japanese, French and Mandarin
- Campus size: 30 acre (0.121 sqm^2)
- Campus type: Closed access campus

Sekolah Menengah Sains Tapah (English: Tapah Science Middle School; abbreviated SESTA) is a Malaysian government boarding school (Sekolah Berasrama Penuh/SBP) located in the town of Tapah, Perak. It occupies an area of 30 acres of land, four kilometers from the town. It opened on 12 April 2010.

== Location ==
SESTA is located 4 kilometers (3 miles) from Tapah main town, along the Federal Route 59 (Tapah-Cameron Highlands road) and just opposite to the 4 Malay Regiment (4RAMD) army camp and beside the new Batang Padang District Education Office (PPD). It is mainly accessible from the town via the FT1-FT59 junction, from Cameron Highlands 50 km down west, and also 2 km eastward from Tapah exit of North-South Highway (E1) towards the same route.

== History ==
=== Planning and Construction ===
Construction started on 12 October 2006 and was scheduled to be completed on 11 November 2008, but was delayed to 29 August 2009. Zulkarnain Zainal Abidin was appointed as the caretaker of the school in March 2009, but his appointment were delayed until June due to the slow progress of the school construction . The total cost of the construction was RM38,482,000.00.

=== Opening ===
The school was opened on 23 October 2009 by Hajjah Norlia Mohd Shuhaili, Deputy Director of the Residential and Excellence School Department. On 1 February 2010, Hadi Mat Dain was appointed as the first principal of the school. By March 2010, 35 teachers had been hired. The school's first intake of students started on 16 April 2010. Owing to the lack of complete infrastructure at the time, the Upper Form intake began the following year.

=== Inauguration ===
After around 10 years, SESTA was inaugurated by the Sultan of Perak, Sultan Nazrin Muizzuddin Shah on 18 October 2019 in a grand ceremony held at Dewan Seri Bitara (formerly and famously known as Dewan SESTA), in conjunction with his birthday celebration. Perak nobles and leaders, particularly the Raja Permaisuri Tuanku Zara, both Raja Muda and Raja Dihilir also attended the ceremony with their respective spouses, alongside the then Menteri Besar, Ahmad Faizal.
