= Malaysia Federal Route 432 =

Road in Malaysia

Federal Route 432
- Jalan Gunung Brinchang

Route information
- Length: 6.7 km (4.2 mi)
- Existed: 1920s–present

Major junctions
- East end: FT 59 Jalan Brinchang
- FT 59 Jalan Brinchang
- West end: Gunung Brinchang

Location
- Country: Malaysia
- Primary destinations: Sungai Palas Tea BOH Estate

Highway system
- Highways in Malaysia; Expressways; Federal; State

Jalan Gunung Brinchang, Federal Route 432, is a federal road in Cameron Highlands, Pahang, Malaysia. It is the highest paved road in Malaysia. It is also a main route to the Sungai Palas Tea BOH Estate.

== Route Background ==
Jalan Gunung Brinchang is a 6.7-km single-lane paved road that extends from the base to the top of Gunung Brinchang. Its terminal junction at the Federal Route 59 is located about 4.2 km from Brinchang, Cameron Highlands. The gradient varies between 5% and 10% until the end of the maintenance limit border at Gunung Irau camping site, where the gradient becomes steeper (up to 20%). Consequently, the speed limit for this road is 20 km/h only. As a result, the short 6.7-km journey from the bottom to the top may take about half an hour.

At most sections, Federal Route 432 was built under the JKR R1 road standard, with a speed limit of 20 km/h.

== List of junctions ==
Km	Exit	Junctions	To	Remarks
FT 432; 0		FT 59 Jalan Brinchang	FT 59 Jalan Brinchang North; FT 59 Kuala Terla; FT 185 Simpang Pulai; FT 1 Ipoh; FT 185 Gua Musang; FT 8 Kota Bharu South; FT 59 Brinchang; FT 59 Tanah Rata; FT 59 Ringlet; FT 102 Kuala Lipis; FT 102 Raub; East Coast Expressway FT 2 Kuantan; FT 59 Tapah; North–South Expressway Northern Route AH2 Kuala Lumpur	T-junctions; Start/end of narrow roads
		V	V	
		Jalan Sungai Palas; Sungai Palas Tea BOH Estate	East; Jalan Sungai Palas; Sungai Palas Tea BOH Estate; BOH Tea Factory; Visitor Centre, Tea Shop and Stall; V	T-junctions
		V	V	
		Brinchang Orang Asli village		
		V	V	
		Gunung Irau camping site Hutan Lipur Mossy	V	
FT 432; 6.7		Gunung Brinchang; 2032 m above sea level	Gunung Brinchang; VHF Stations; Microwave Stations V	Start/end of narrow roads Pahang-Perak border at the VHF stations
