= Caroline Russell (businesswoman) =

Malaysian British businesswoman (born 1965 or 1966)

- Born: 1965 or 1966 (age 59–60); Kuala Lumpur, Malaysia
- Citizenship: Malaysia
- Education: Alice Smith School
- Alma mater: University of Edinburgh (BCom (Hons))
- Occupation: Business executive
- Years active: 1988–present
- Known for: Eexcutive chairman of BOH Plantations
- Spouse: Mehmet Alguel
- Children: 2
- Father: Tristan Beauchamp Russell
- Relatives: John Archibald Russell (grandfather)
- Awards: Forbes' 2020 Asia's Power Businesswomen list

Caroline Christine Russell (born 1965 or 1966) is a Malaysian businesswoman with British descent, who is currently the executive chairman of the largest tea producer in Malaysia, BOH Plantations, since 2003. She was listed in the Forbes' 2020 Asia's Power Businesswomen List.

== Early life and education ==
Russell was born in Kuala Lumpur, Malaysia to her father Tristan Russell, the owner of BOH Plantations at the time. She spent much of her childhood in BOH's tea estates in Cameron Highlands. Her childhood hobby was horse ridding and at one point in time kept a pony at the highlands.

Russell completed her primary education at the Kuala Lumpur Alice Smith School, and her secondary education in Scotland. She graduated from the University of Edinburgh in 1988 with a commerce degree. During her degree studies, she undertook an executive development programme at the Darden Business School of the University of Virginia. Shortly after her graduation, she joined the marketing department of his father's company.

== Career ==
=== In BOH Plantations ===
Russell first joined her father's company, BOH Plantations in 1988 at the age of 22, after the completion of her commerce degree. She was appointed to the board of directors of BOH in 1994, and later ascended to the post of general manager in 1998. In 2002, she was tasked with the management of the company tea estates, and in 2003, Russell assumed the position of CEO in the company. In 2017, she became the deputy chairman of BOH. Two years later in 2019, she succeeded her father as the executive chairman after his retirement.

As of 2019, she held a 1.74% share in JA Russell & Co, one the parent companies of BOH Plantations.

=== Outside BOH Plantations ===
Russell is a member of the Governing Council of Yayasan Sime Darby since 16 October 2008. She is also a trustee of Yayasan Hasanah, a foundation of Khazanah Nasional Berhad, as of 2024. She is also the director of Tehdara Sdn. Bhd. and Nerada (Pty) Ltd, an Australian tea producing company. Between 2006 and 2012, she was a general committee member of the Malaysian International Chamber of Commerce and Industry (MICCI).

== Recognition ==
In 1998, she was nominated for the Chivas Regal Achievement Unlimited Award. Russell was also a top nominee in the Ernst & Young Entrepreneur of the Year (Malaysia) Award in 2004. In 2020, she entered into the Forbes' 2020 Asia's Power Businesswomen List, which showed case 25 prominent businesswomen in Asia-Pacific region.

== Personal life ==
She is married with Mehmet Alguel, and they had two daughters, Natalie Alguel and Kathleen Alguel.

== See also ==
- Women in business
