= Brinchang =

Town and hill resort in Pahang, Malaysia

- Settlement of Cameron Highlands
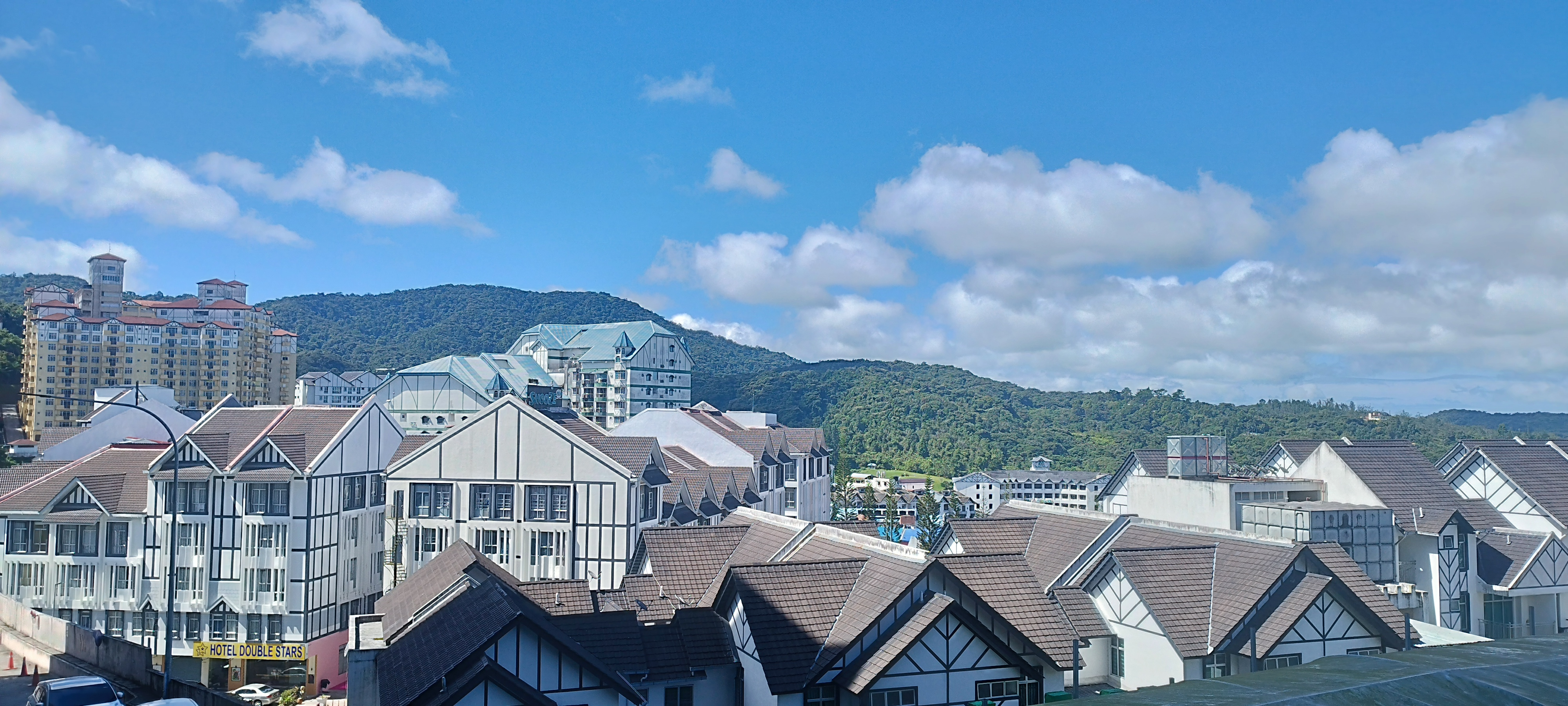
- Downtown Brinchang
- Interactive map of Brinchang
- Brinchang in Pahang Brinchang (Malaysia) Brinchang (Southeast Asia)
- Coordinates: 4°29′27.6″N 101°23′18.6″E
- Country: Malaysia
- State: Pahang
- District: Cameron Highlands District

Government
  - Type: District council
  - Body: Cameron Highlands District Council
- Time zone: UTC+8 (MST)
- Postal code: 39xxx
- Area code(s): 06-5xxxxxxx
- Vehicle registration: C

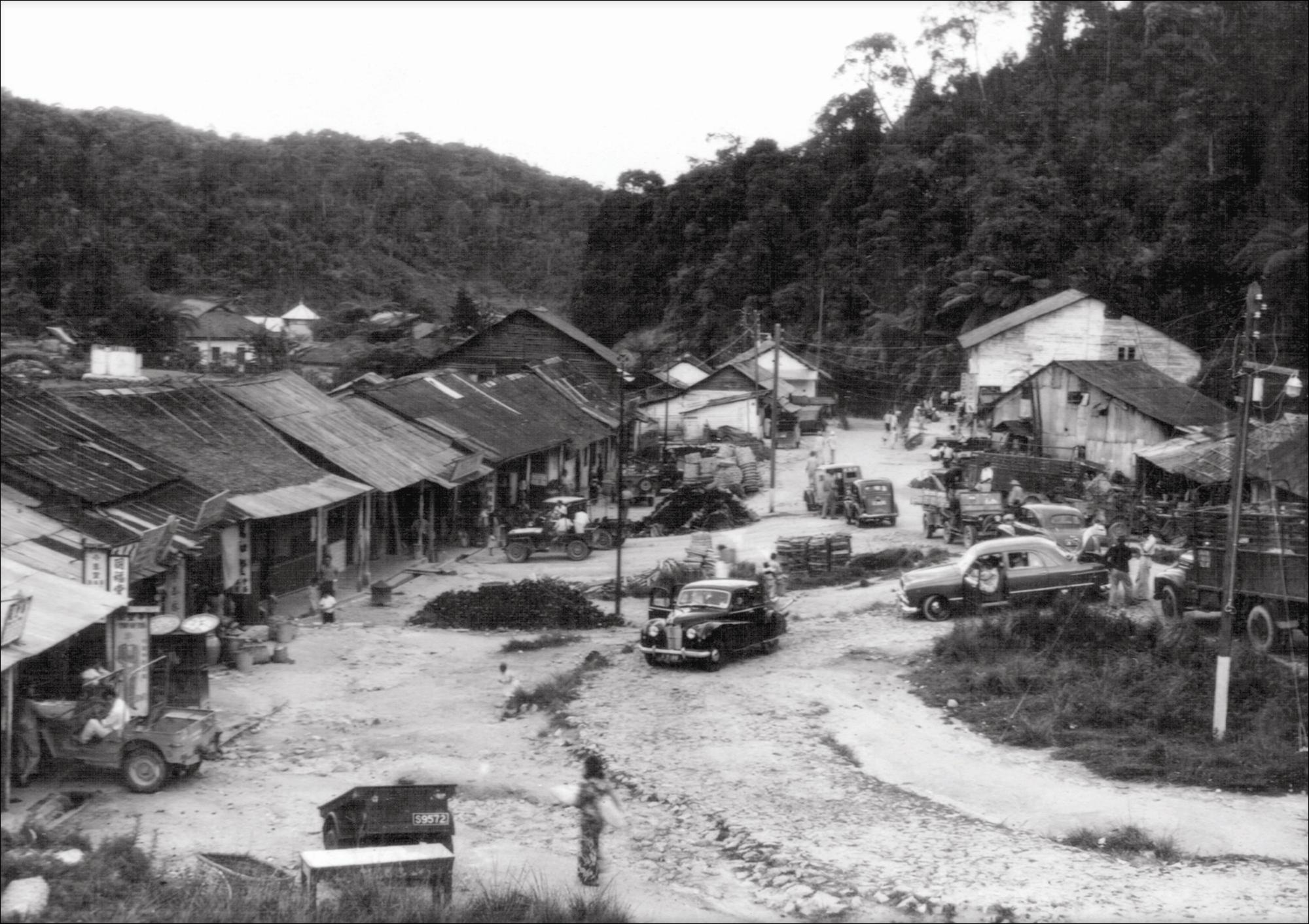
Brinchang (c. 1950s).

Brinchang (also spelt Berincang) is a town and hill resort located at an altitude of 1,540 metres (5,050 ft) in Cameron Highlands in the state of Pahang, Malaysia. The town's name is derived from nearby Gunung Brinchang, which is the second highest point in Cameron Highlands.

Brinchang is the second largest township of Cameron Highlands, situated on a gently sloping plateau about 2 km after Tanah Rata or 3 km before Kea Farm. While relatively small in spread compared to Tanah Rata, Brinchang is the densest in development - a tourist hub with local flavours and style.

The epicentre of Brinchang is a tight pocket of shophouses—restaurants, stores and budget hotels, while the surroundings hold further commercial developments, holiday apartments and residential homes.

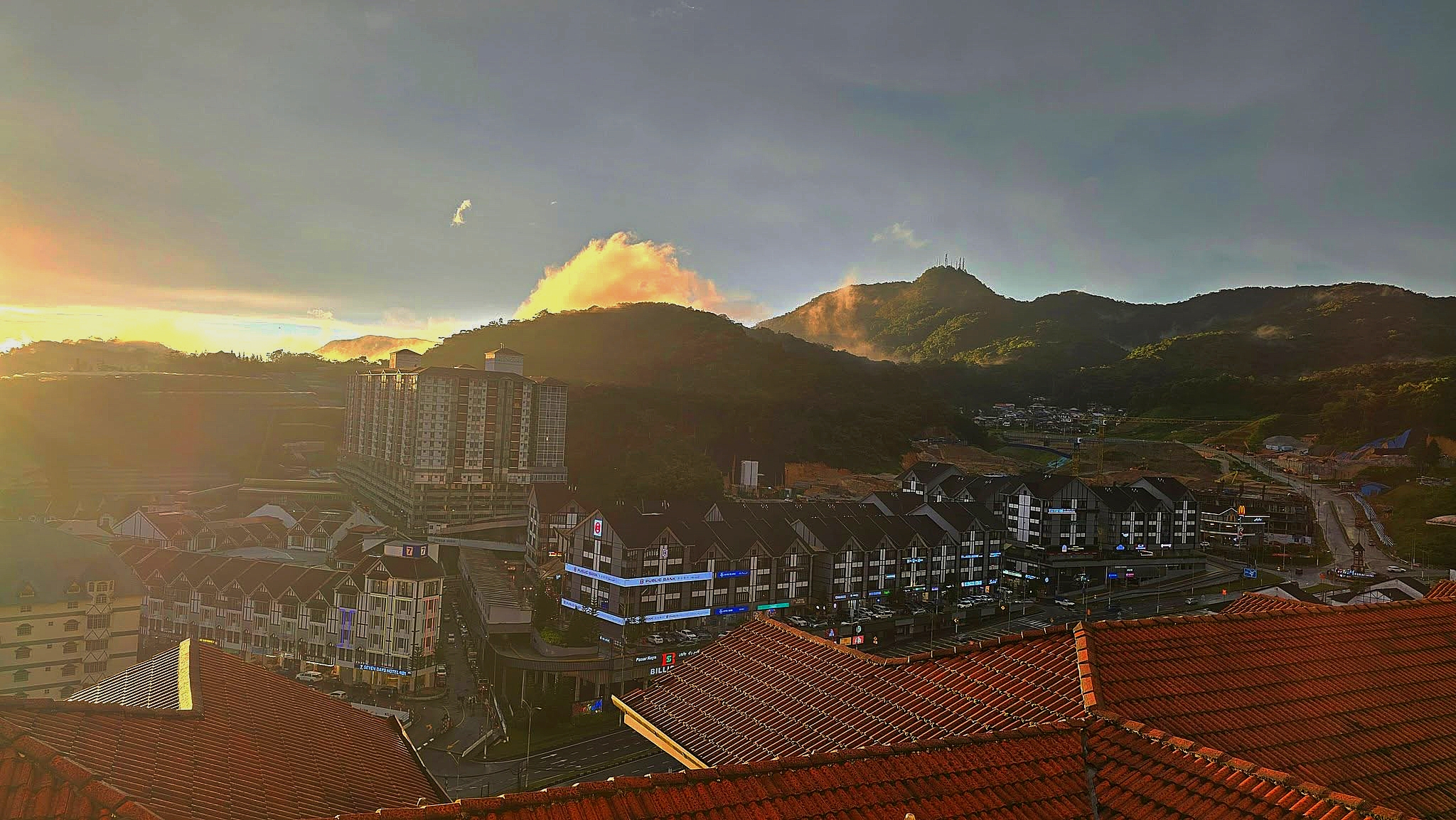
Cameron Centrum area with Mount Brinchang behind, at sunset

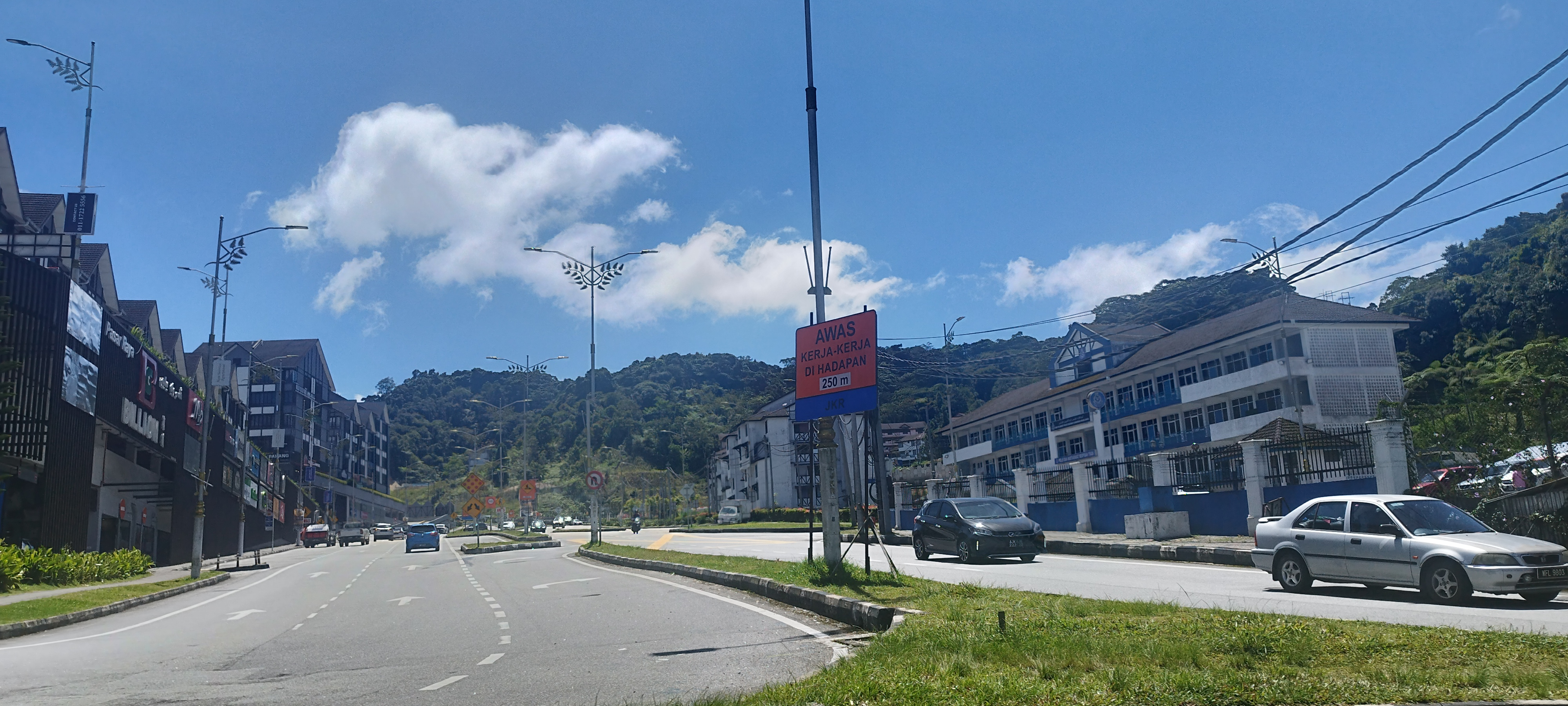
Cameron Centrum area in Downtown Brinchang

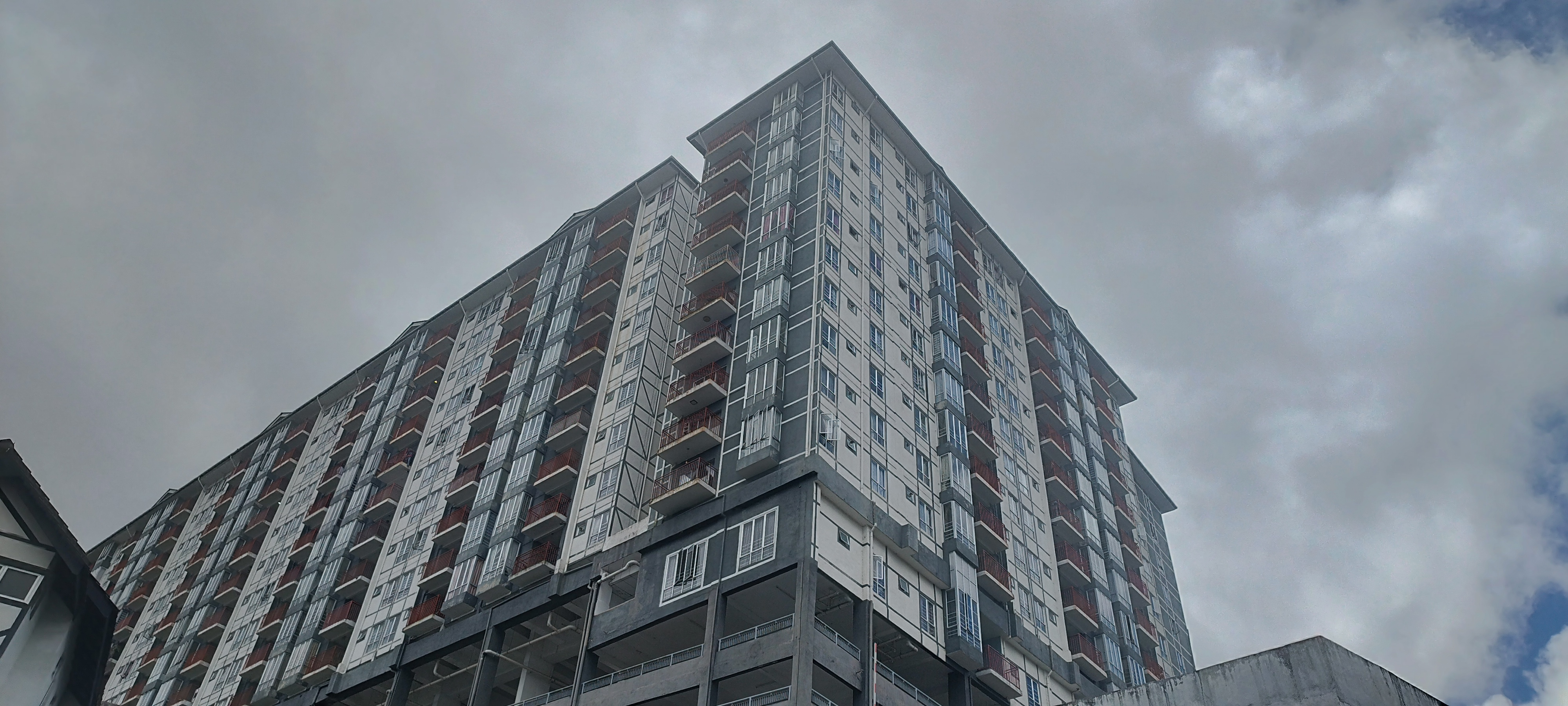
Emerald Avenue Apartment, completed in 2020

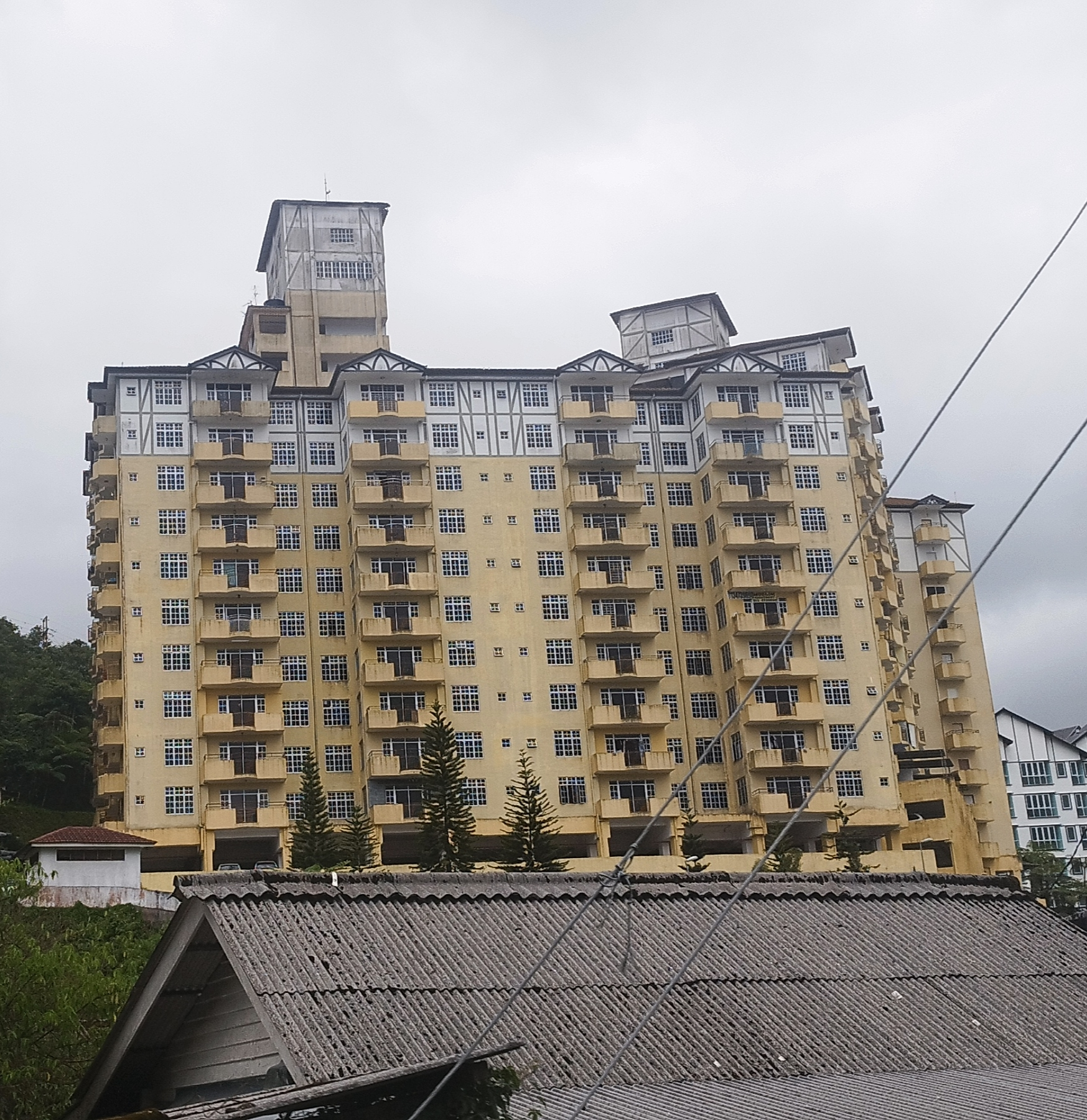
Crown Imperial Court Apartment, completed in 2011

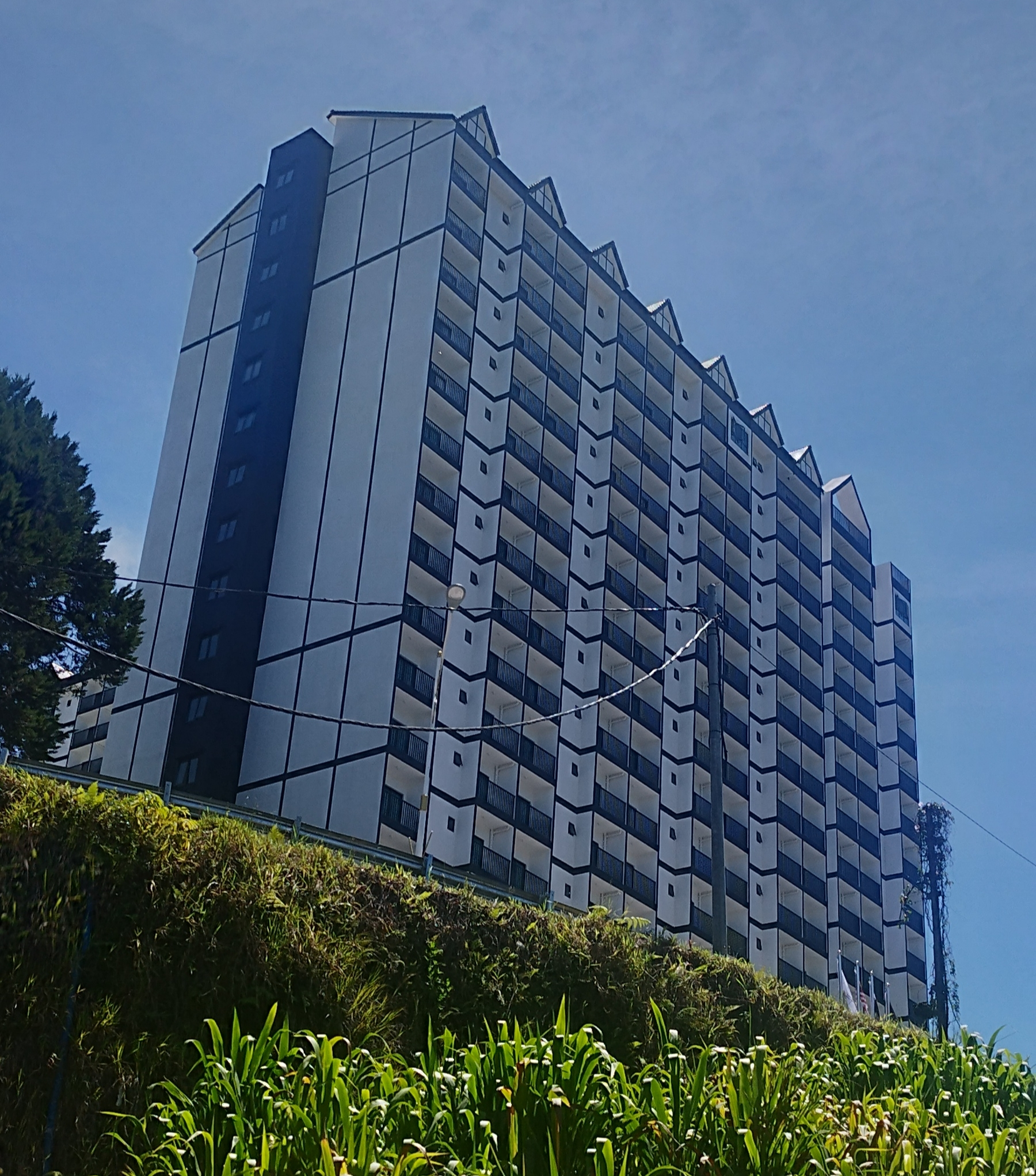
Oakwood Cameron Highlands Hotel, opened in March 2026

== Attractions ==
Brinchang Night Market (Pasar Malam Brinchang) – Famous for street food, souvenirs, and fresh strawberries. Night Market (moved to Golden Hills approximately 2 km away at 12, Jalan Golden Hills 1, Brinchang, 39000 Brinchang, Pahang, Malaysia) available during weekends and the Malaysian school holidays, where many vegetable stalls and food stalls are set up.

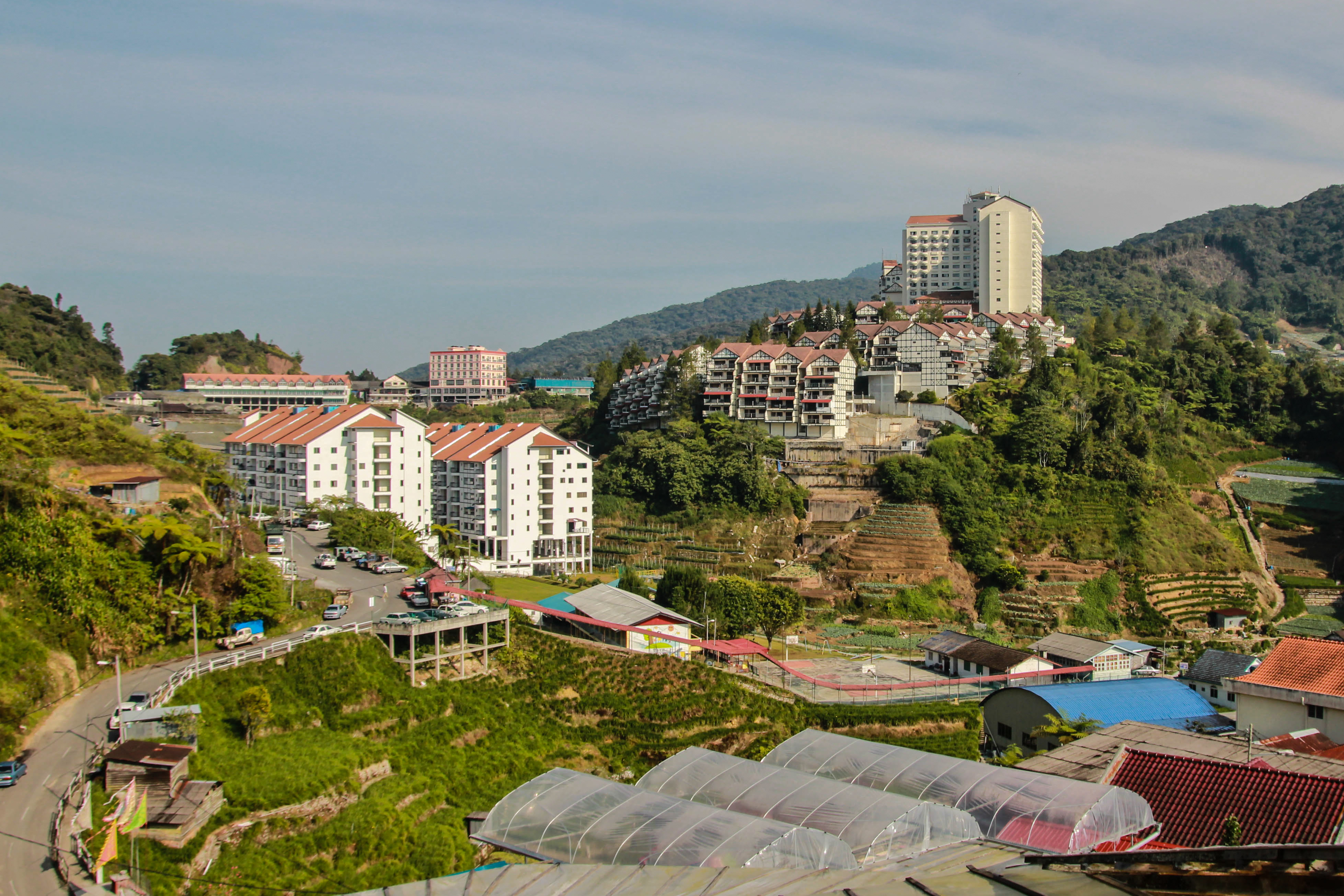
Brinchang, Cameron Highlands.

== Transport ==
Brinchang is served by Federal Route 59, the main road that links all townships and settlements in the Cameron Highlands. At Kea Farm, FT59 is connected to Jalan Gunung Brinchang, which is the highest motorable road in Malaysia.

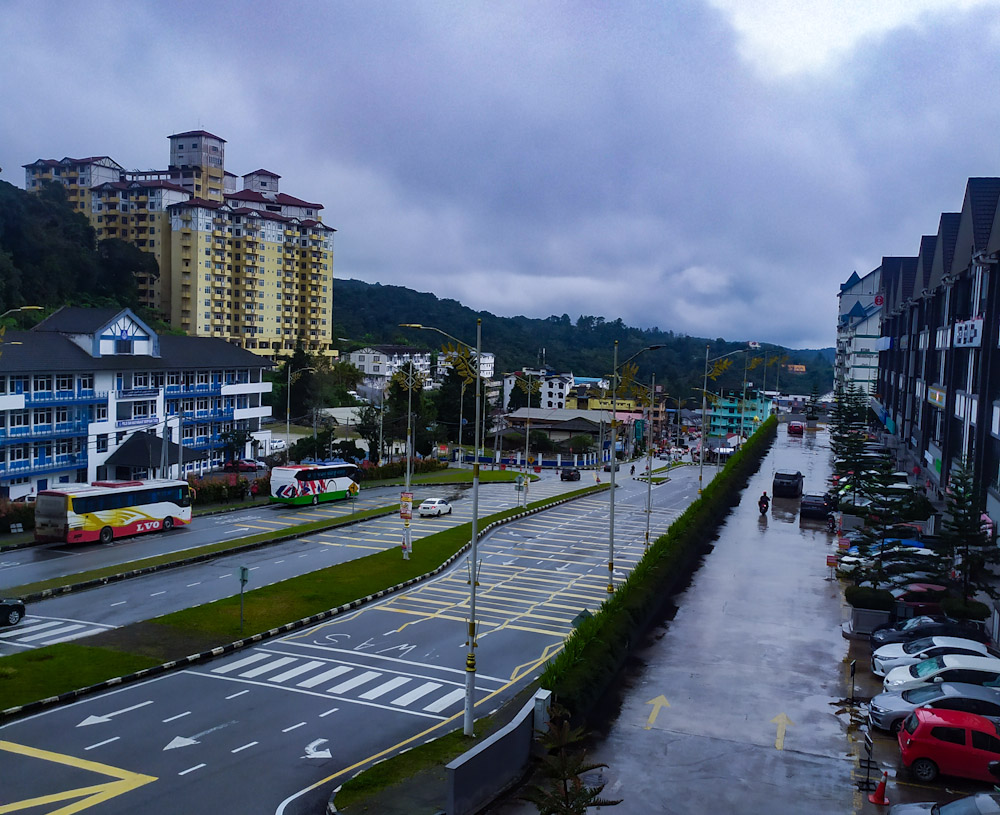
Federal Route 59 passes through Brinchang

== Climate ==
The Köppen-Geiger climate classification system classifies its climate as subtropical highland (Cfb). Temperatures are mild year-round albeit rainy. Two extra rainy seasons occur during the course of the year, with the shorter one running from April to May, and the longer one running from September to December.

Climate data for Brinchang
Month	Jan	Feb	Mar	Apr	May	Jun	Jul	Aug	Sep	Oct	Nov	Dec	Year
Mean daily maximum °C (°F)	20.6 (69.1)	21.4 (70.5)	22.1 (71.8)	22.4 (72.3)	22.4 (72.3)	22.1 (71.8)	21.6 (70.9)	21.6 (70.9)	21.4 (70.5)	21.3 (70.3)	21.1 (70.0)	20.6 (69.1)	21.6 (70.8)
Daily mean °C (°F)	16.7 (62.1)	17.2 (63.0)	17.6 (63.7)	18.2 (64.8)	18.3 (64.9)	18 (64)	17.4 (63.3)	17.6 (63.7)	17.5 (63.5)	17.6 (63.7)	17.5 (63.5)	17.1 (62.8)	17.6 (63.6)
Mean daily minimum °C (°F)	12.9 (55.2)	13 (55)	13.4 (56.1)	14 (57)	14.3 (57.7)	13.9 (57.0)	13.2 (55.8)	13.6 (56.5)	13.6 (56.5)	13.9 (57.0)	13.9 (57.0)	13.6 (56.5)	13.6 (56.4)
Average precipitation mm (inches)	172 (6.8)	133 (5.2)	198 (7.8)	260 (10.2)	250 (9.8)	130 (5.1)	149 (5.9)	159 (6.3)	215 (8.5)	314 (12.4)	313 (12.3)	262 (10.3)	2,555 (100.6)
Average rainy days	14	12	14	18	18	15	17	19	22	24	25	21	219
Mean monthly sunshine hours	186	198	217	210	186	180	186	155	150	155	150	155	2,128
Source 1: Climate-Data.org (altitude: 1567m)
Source 2: Weather2Travel for rainy days and sunshine
