= Mount Batu Brinchang =

Mountain in Pahang and Perak, Malaysia

- Mount Brinchang
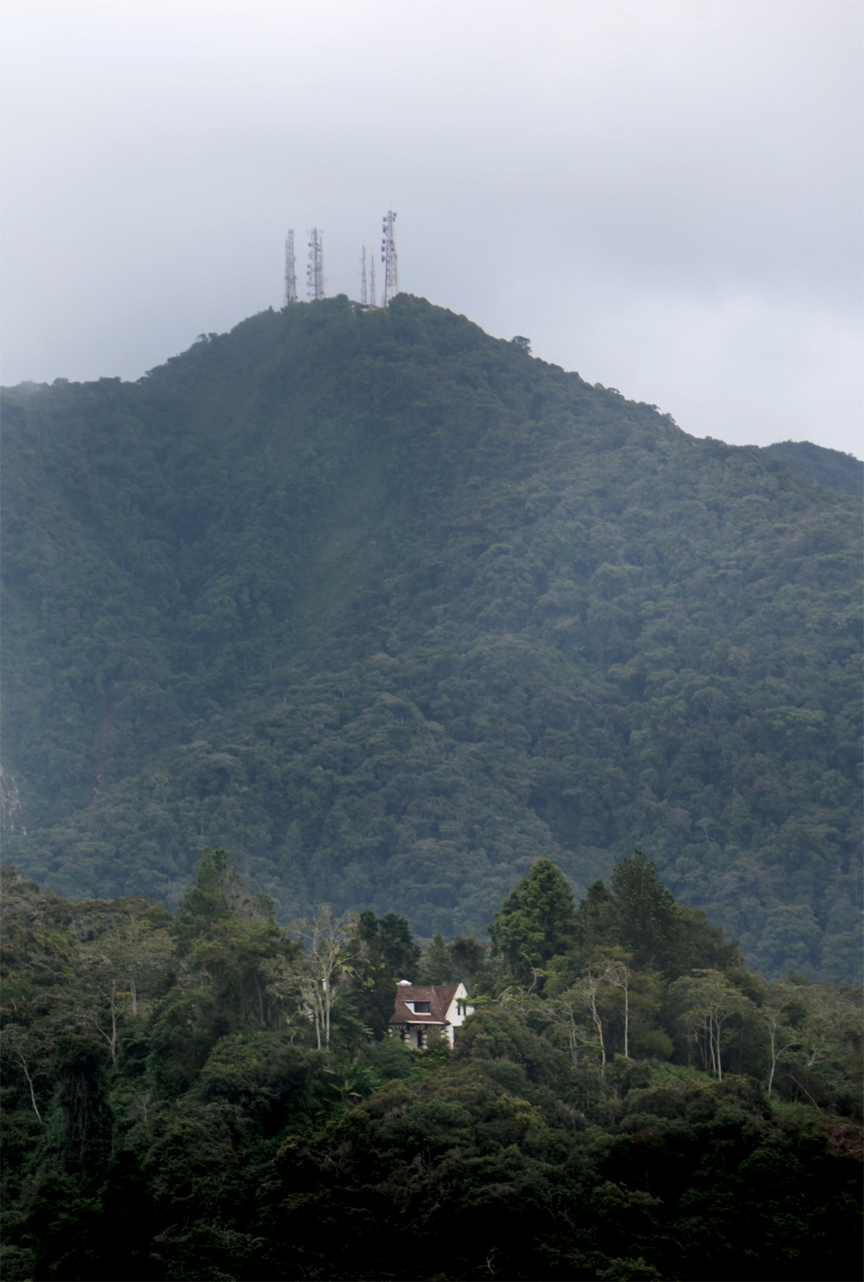
- Batu Brinchang, with the "Moonlight" bungalow in the foreground

Highest point
- Elevation: 2,032 m (6,667 ft)
- Coordinates: 4°30′02″N 101°23′21″E

Geography
- Location within Malaysia
- Location: Cameron Highlands District, Pahang; Kampar District, Perak
- Parent range: Titiwangsa Mountains

Climbing
- Easiest route: Hike; Jalan Gunung Brinchang

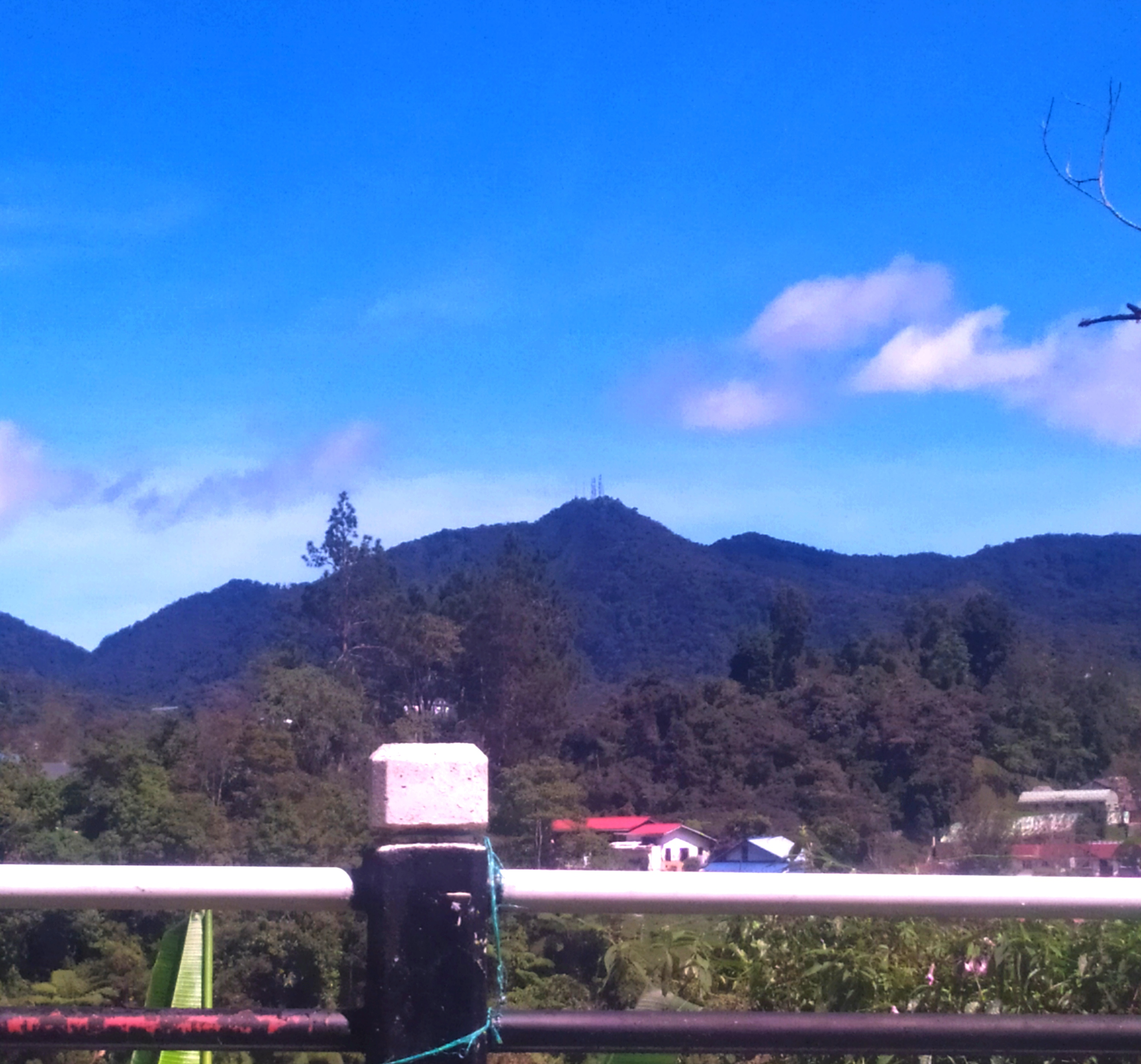
As seen from Kampung Taman Sedia, Tanah Rata.

Mount Batu Brinchang (Malay: Gunung Batu Brinchang), commonly referred to as Mount Brinchang, is a mountain in the Titiwangsa Mountains located on the border of Pahang and Perak, Malaysia. Standing at 2,032 metres (6,667 ft) above sea level, it is the second-highest peak in the Cameron Highlands after Mount Irau. It is notable for being the highest mountain in the region that can be reached by road.

== Geography ==
Mount Batu Brinchang lies within the Cameron Highlands District of Pahang and partly extends into the Kampar District of Perak. The area is characterised by montane forests, mossy highland vegetation, and cool temperatures throughout the year.

== Features ==
The mountain is unique in Peninsular Malaysia for its paved road that reaches all the way to the summit, making it accessible by car or taxi. This road is recognised as the highest accessible road in Peninsular Malaysia.

At the summit, there is a telecommunications micro-station, as well as an observation tower which provides panoramic views of the surrounding highlands and the Titiwangsa Range. On clear days, the views extend across Pahang and Perak, and occasionally as far as the neighbouring state of Kelantan.

== Hiking and Access ==
The easiest route to the summit is via Jalan Gunung Brinchang, a narrow paved road beginning from the town of Brinchang.

By road: From Brinchang town, the summit can be reached via a 12 km winding road. Walking the entire stretch takes around three hours. Taxis are also available for hire from Brinchang.

By trail: For hikers seeking a more natural experience, a forest trail starts near Brinchang town and cuts directly through the montane forest to the summit. The trail is shorter but significantly steeper and more challenging.

== Tourism ==
Due to its accessibility, Mount Batu Brinchang is a popular tourist destination within Cameron Highlands. Visitors often combine a trip to the summit with nearby attractions such as the Mossy Forest boardwalk, tea plantations, and strawberry farms.

== See also ==
- Mount Irau
- Cameron Highlands
- List of mountains in Malaysia
