= Tringkap =

Town in Pahang, Malaysia

Coordinates: 4°31′N 101°25′E

Tringkap is a small town in Cameron Highlands, Pahang, Malaysia. It is also known as 'Dai Gong Si' (大公司) by the locals as it was once upon a time where the tea plantation corporation located (now Boh Tea Plantation). It is located 8 km from Brinchang and just beside the famous tea plantation, the Sungai Palas BOH Tea Plantation. Among the famous spots are rose valley, bees farms, vegetable farms and various stalls selling fresh vegetables, flowers, kinds of honey, strawberry and other local produces.
