= Mount Irau =

Mountain in Pahang and Perak, Malaysia

Coordinates: 4°31′46″N 101°21′57″E

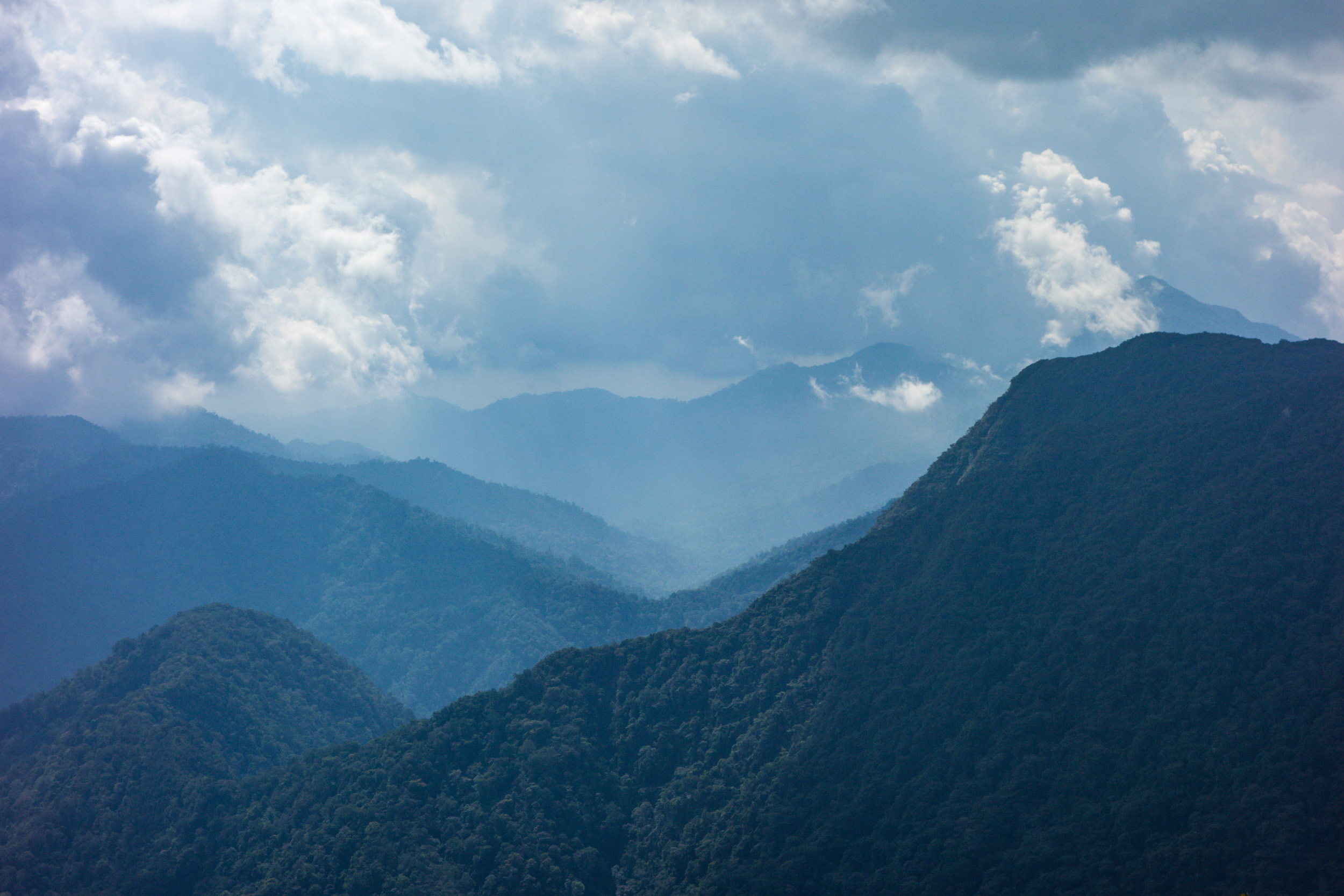
- View of the Pahangese/Perakian Titiwangsa from the summit of Irau

Highest point
- Elevation: 2,110 m (6,920 ft)
- Prominence: 668 m (2,192 ft)
- Listing: Spesial Ribu

Naming
- Native name: Gunung Irau (Malay)

Geography
- Location within Malaysia
- Location: Cameron Highlands District, Pahang; Kampar District, Perak
- Parent range: Titiwangsa Mountains

Mount Irau (Malay: Gunung Irau) is a high mountain located at the border of Pahang and Perak states, Malaysia. Part of the Titiwangsa Mountains, Irau's summit is 2,110 m (6,920 ft), making it the highest mountain in the Cameron Highlands region, as well as the 15th highest mountain in Malaysia.

Irau's unique characteristic is the cold and misty mossy forest. A person hikes about three hours to reach Irau from the base of the mountain.

It takes around 3-4 hours to reach the peak. Usually hikers will park their car at Cameron Square (Basement 2, Free parking) and they will take 4WD ride to go to the starting point of Irau.

The Mossy Forest Eco Forest Park is located within the mountain.

== Gallery ==
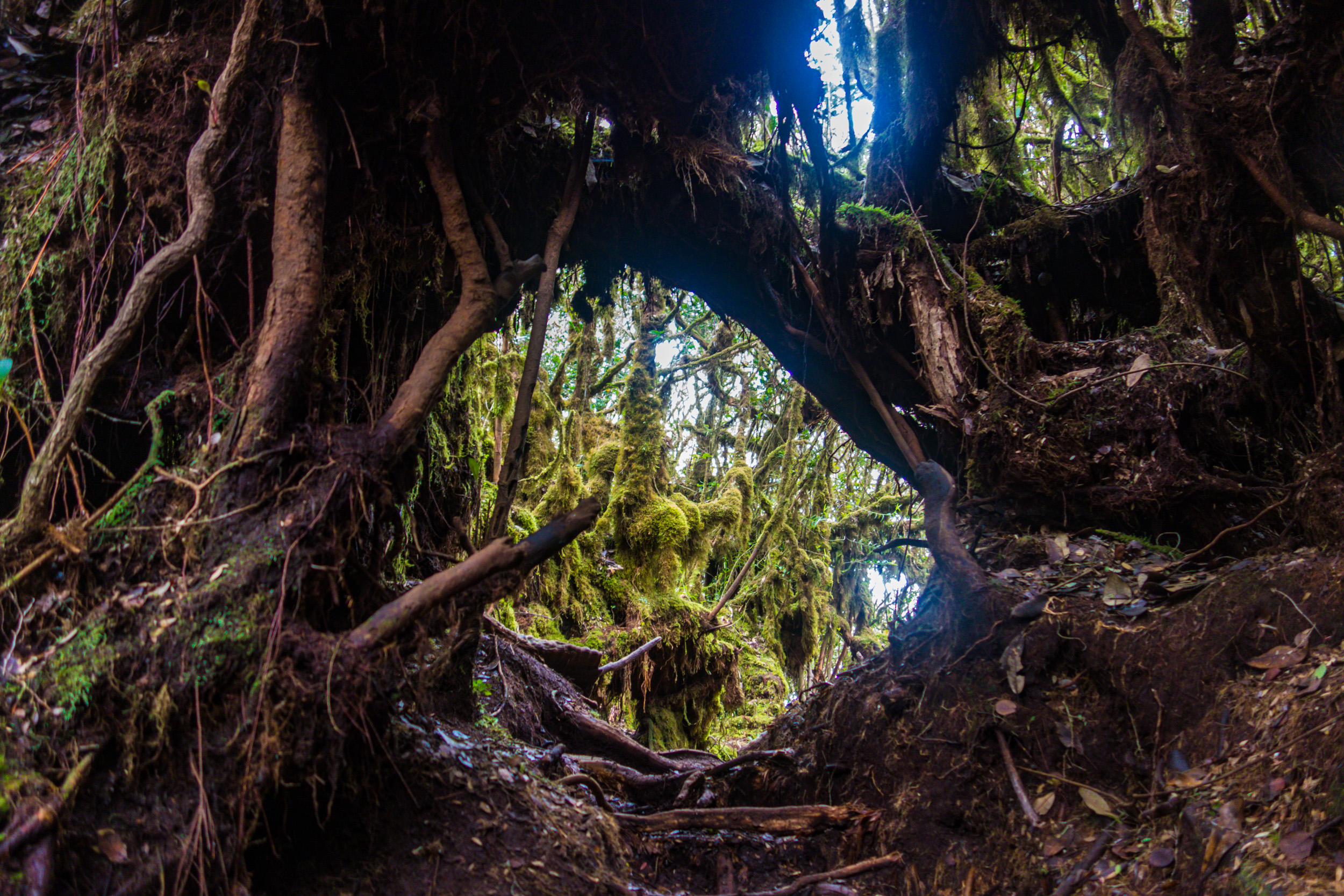
Cloud forest of Irau

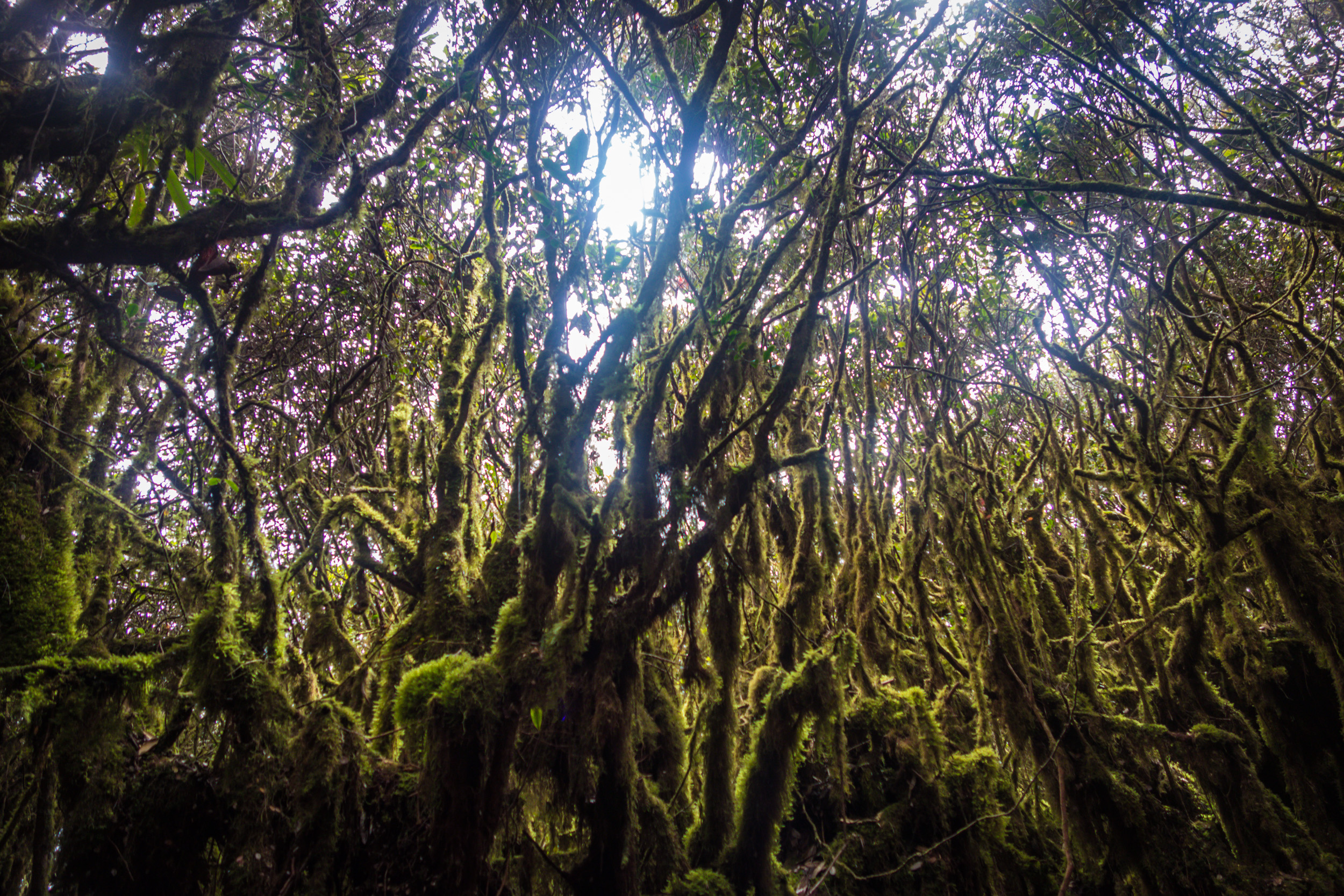
Cloud forest of Irau

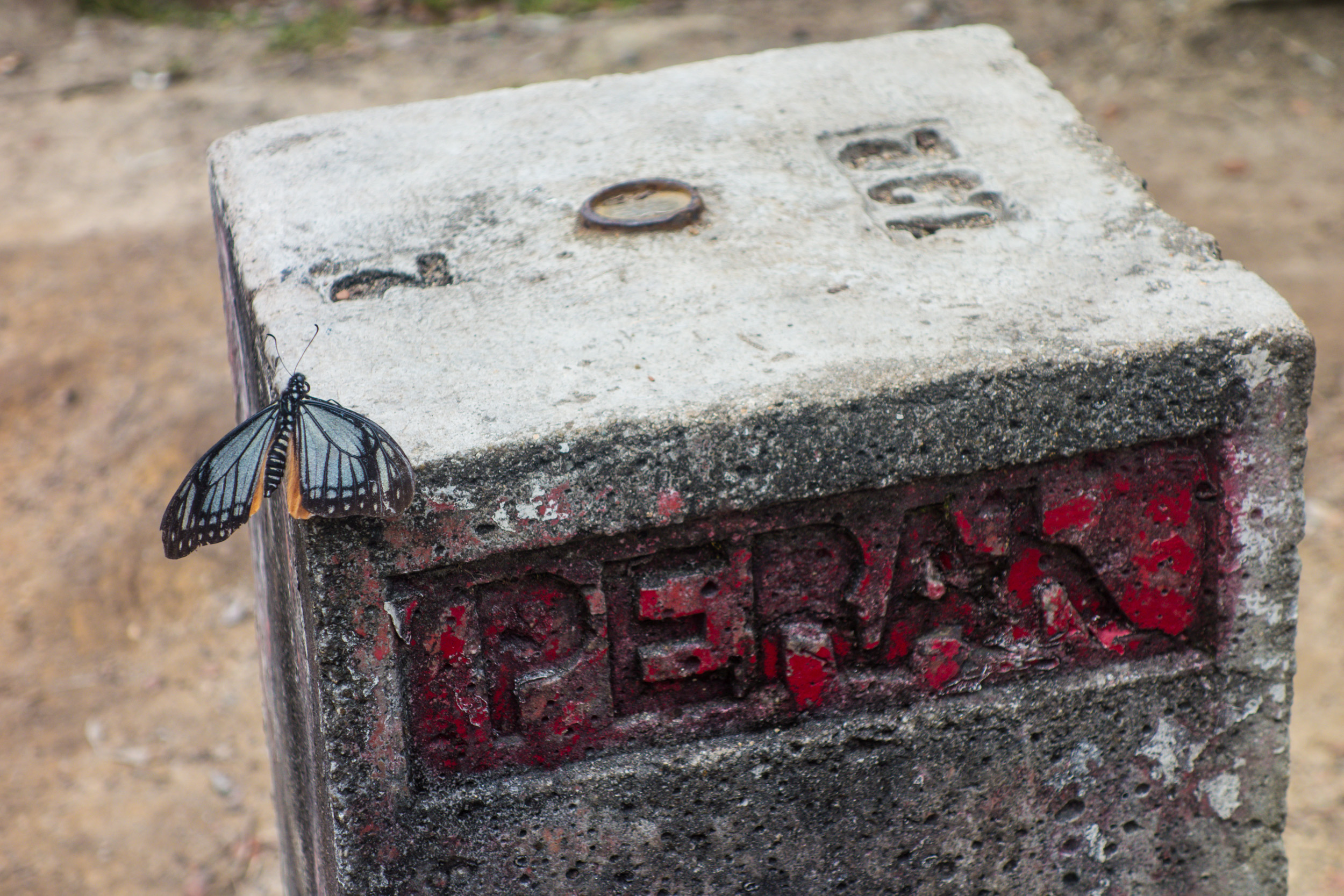
Pahang–Perak state border marker at the summit

== See also ==
- Cameron Highlands
- List of mountains in Malaysia
