= Kampung Kuala Terla =

Coordinates: 4°32′N 101°25′E

Kampung Kuala Terla is one of the small towns in Cameron Highlands of Malaysia, is located 5 km away from Kampung Raja. Most of the people here are farmers.

The people here converse well in Tamil, Cantonese, Mandarin and Bahasa Melayu. The population consist of mostly Chinese, Tamils and Malays.

The tourism industry in this area of Cameron Highlands has grown rapidly since the official opening of the Second East-West Highway. Tourist attractions such as a coffee shop and souvenir stalls are mushrooming all over this small town.
