= BOH Plantations =

Largest black tea manufacturer in Malaysia

BOH Plantations Sdn Bhd

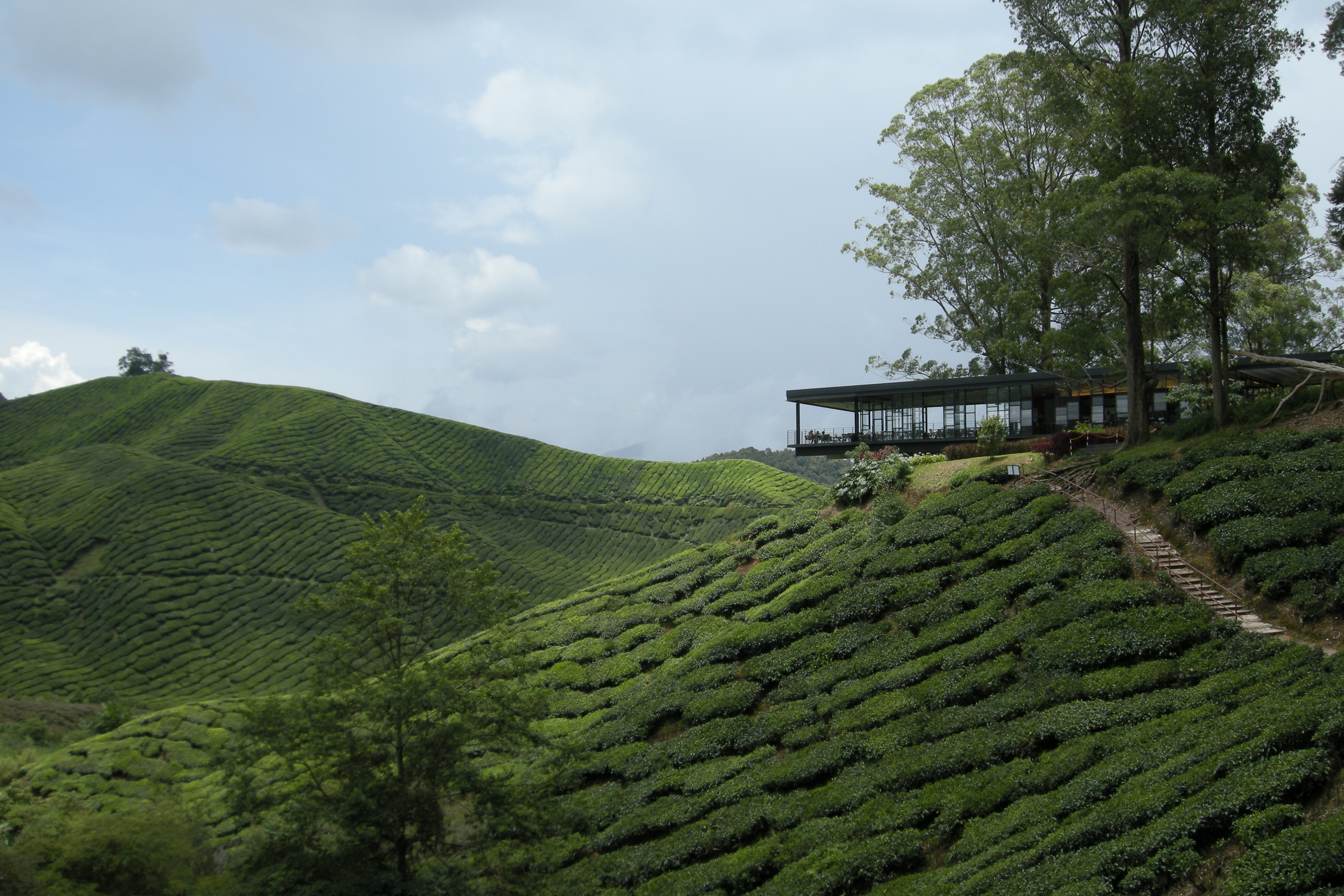
- BOH tea estate
- Type: Private limited company
- Industry: Tea
- Founded: 1929 in Cameron Highlands, Malaya
- Founder: J.A. Russell
- Headquarters: Kuala Lumpur, Malaysia
- Key people: Caroline Russell (CEO, executive chair)
- Products: Tea
- Website: bohtea.com

BOH Plantations Sdn Bhd (doing business as BOH) is the largest black tea manufacturer in Malaysia, with both domestic and international distribution. The BOH tea plantation, which is located in Cameron Highlands, Pahang, is also the largest tea plantation in the country. It was founded in 1929 by J. A. Russell, a British-born businessman, during the British colonial era in Malaya; the plantation was the first hill country estate established in Malaya at the time.

== History ==
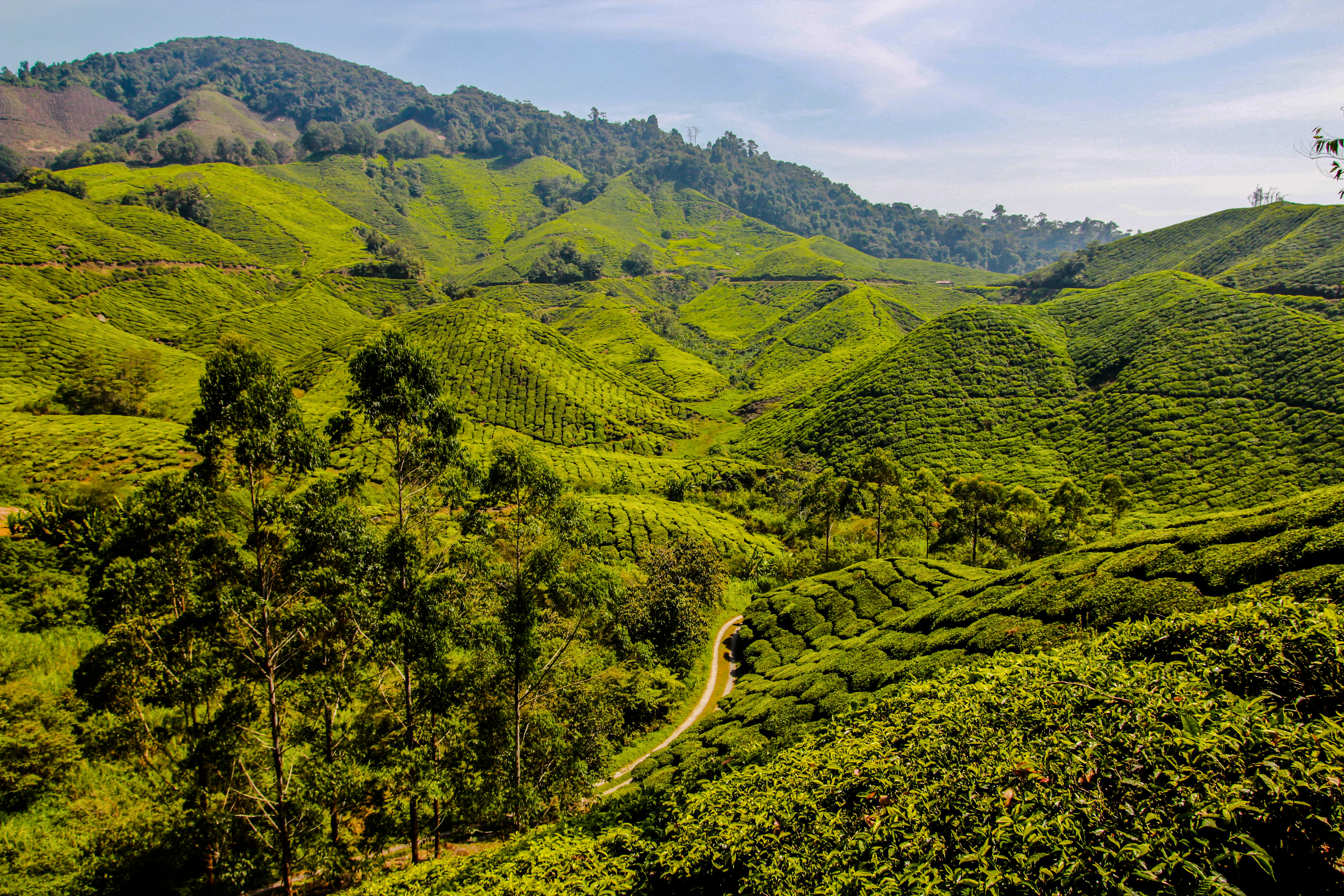
BOH tea plantation in Cameron Highlands, Malaysia

James Archibald Russell arrived in Kuala Lumpur in 1890 at age seven and learned to speak several Chinese languages, along with Malay. The primary export from Malaya, which was a British colony at the time, was tin. Prior to BOH, Russell had worked in the Straits Trading Company, where he made connections with wealthy Chinese tin miners thanks to his proficiency in their languages. Besides investing in tin, Russell and his brothers (Philip, Donald, and Robert) put money in the nascent rubber industry in 1908. J. A. and Philip also invested in railway-related construction, including the new Kuala Lumpur railway station, which was built by one of Russell's companies between 1910 and 1917. In 1913, Russell purchased almost a third of the real estate in the town of Ipoh. He and Donald (a mining engineer from the Colorado School of Mines) founded a colliery at Batu Arang, Selangor, around 25 kilometres from the capital.

Despite the worldwide Great Depression at the time BOH was founded in 1929, Russell was optimistic about the tea plantation business, due to steady demand. He was granted a land concession (together with veteran tea planter A.B. Milne from Ceylon) for the first BOH tea garden in Habu. At the time, the land was undeveloped jungle terrain, on steep slopes; with a steamroller and mule teams, the stepped plantation was created. The plantation was named after Bohea Hills in Fujian, China, where "bohea" or wuyi (武夷) tea comes from.

As of 2016, BOH Plantations owned four tea gardens: in Habu, Fairlie Tea Garden, Sungai Palas Tea Garden, and Bukit Cheeding in Selangor. There is a packaging factory near the main garden, and the company offers tours. Together, these four plantations total about 1,200 hectares of land and produce about 4 million kg of tea every year, accounting for about 70% of Malaysian tea output.

== See also ==
- List of tea companies
