= Tanah Rata =

Coordinates: 4°28′N 101°23′E

- Town and district capital
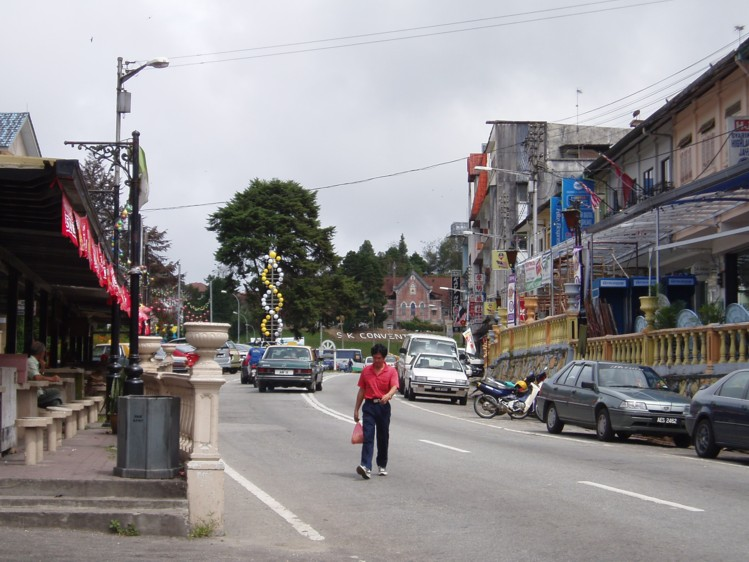
- Tanah Rata (c. 2005)
- Interactive map of Tanah Rata
- Country: Malaysia
- State: Pahang Darul Makmur
- District: Cameron Highlands District

Government
  - Body: Cameron Highlands District Council
- Elevation: 1,440 m (4,720 ft)
- Postcode: 39000
- MP: Ramli Mohd. Noor

Tanah Rata is a town located in Cameron Highlands, Pahang, Malaysia. The name "tanah rata" means flat ground in Malay and it refers to the relatively flat area on which the town is located amidst this highland region. It has an elevation of 1,440 metres (4,720 ft).

It is the largest town in the Cameron Highlands region and contains many facilities and amenities, including the district council, banks and ATMs, the main Police Station of Cameron Highlands and the main hospital in Cameron Highlands. There is a taxi station and a bus station for travel to other parts of Cameron Highlands, as well as to Ipoh and to Kuala Lumpur. There are also backpacker inns and hotels at various prices.

== History ==
Cameron Highlands was founded in the 1920s by British surveyor William Cameron, and Tanah Rata quickly became its administrative and social hub. Its name means “flat land” in Malay, chosen for its relatively level terrain compared to the surrounding hills. During colonial times, the British developed tea plantations, bungalows, and Tudor-style buildings, many of which still define the town’s character today.

== Climate ==
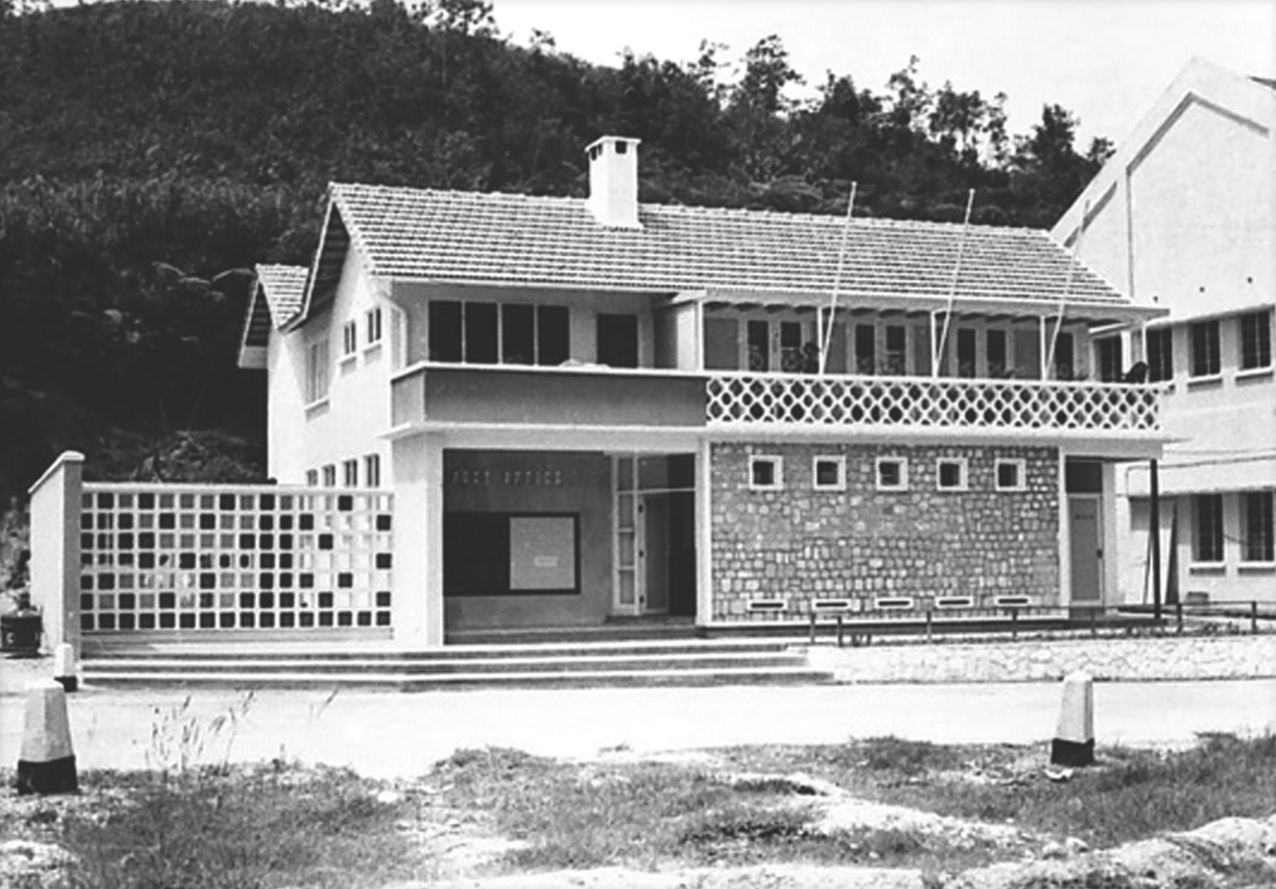
Tanah Rata Post Office (c. 1950s).

Tanah Rata, as part of the Cameron Highlands, has a much cooler climate than in the lowlands, having an altitude of 1,440 metres (4,720 ft) above sea level.

Climate data for Tanah Rata
Month	Jan	Feb	Mar	Apr	May	Jun	Jul	Aug	Sep	Oct	Nov	Dec	Year
Mean daily maximum °C (°F)	21 (69)	22 (71)	22 (71)	23 (73)	23 (73)	22 (71)	22 (71)	22 (71)	22 (71)	22 (71)	21 (69)	21 (69)	22 (71)
Daily mean °C (°F)	17 (62)	17 (63)	18 (64)	19 (66)	19 (66)	18 (64)	18 (64)	18 (64)	18 (64)	18 (64)	17 (63)	17 (63)	17 (63)
Mean daily minimum °C (°F)	13 (55)	13 (55)	14 (57)	15 (59)	15 (59)	14 (57)	14 (57)	14 (57)	14 (57)	14 (57)	14 (57)	14 (57)	14 (57)
Average precipitation mm (inches)	140 (5.6)	120 (4.6)	200 (7.9)	290 (11.4)	260 (10.3)	140 (5.6)	140 (5.6)	170 (6.8)	240 (9.5)	340 (13.4)	320 (12.5)	220 (8.8)	2,590 (101.8)
Source: Weatherbase
