= Helen D. Ling =

Ling in 1974

Helen Dalling Ling (née Dalling; 28 July 1901 – 15 May 1982) was an American-born collector and dealer of Asian art and antiques. She married chemist and physician Tien Gi Ling in 1928 after which they moved to Shanghai, where she opened a "famous" antiques shop. The couple fled to Singapore in 1951 following the Communist takeover of China and she opened another antique shop. After her death, some of the items in her collection were acquired by the Freer Gallery of Art.

== Early life and education ==
Ling was born on 28 July 1901 in Uhrichsville, Ohio, and was raised in Everett, Pennsylvania. She was the daughter of Presbyterian minister Reverend James Dalling. Ling studied at the Bethlehem Business College. She first gained an interest in antiques, particularly Roman glass and pottery, while in America. She met Tien Gi Ling at a picnic organised by the American Baptist Foreign Mission Society in 1925. She was then working at the Columbia University. After Tien Gi had secured a job for her as an English teacher at the Shanghai University, she left Vancouver aboard the Empress in February 1928, arriving in Shanghai two weeks later. Satisfied, she married him several months later. They returned to Shanghai in 1930.

== Career ==
In 1931, Ling opened an antique shop named "The Green Dragon" on the second floor of the Central Arcade at the corner of Nanking Road and Szechuan Road in Shanghai. By October 1937, she had been appointed the English-language secretary of the Shanghai Chinese Women's Club, a war relief organisation. She also worked with the Chinese Young Women's Christian Association.

From 1938 to 1946, Ling acquired antiques at a lower cost from refugees arriving in Shanghai. Although she was born in the United States, she was not interned at a concentration camp during the Japanese occupation as her US citizenship had already been revoked, though it was restored following the end of the war. During the occupation, she met Hans Siegel, a "German in the textile business who had a good appreciation of Chinese ceramics", who in turn introduced her to Jacob Emil Melchior, a Dutch businessman and collector of Chinese ceramics. By the 1940s, she had also become an acquaintance of antiques dealer Edward T. Chow, with whom she spent two years cataloguing the collection of Melchior, who had died by the time they had finished in 1945. After his death, Ling and Chow acquired portions of Melchoir's collection. Her family later speculated that she had acquired around one-third of the collection. These were then sent to the United States in 1949. However, apart from the collection, Ling did not acquire much during the occupation as the family was "just scraping by financially".

As a result of the Communist takeover, the Tien Gi left for Hong Kong in 1950 in hopes of moving the family there. She left for Hong Kong aboard the SS General Gordon, the last ship evacuating citizens of the United States in China on 1 May. There, the couple catalogued Chow's collection. Most of her antiques were left in China as the authorities refused to allow her to take anything that was more than a hundred years old. While in Hong Kong, Ling appeared on the radio and talked on Chinese art and ceramics. They came to Singapore later that year. She initially took over a shop known as "Buttons and Bows". Ling felt that running the store "wasn't very interesting." In 1952, she was involved in an exhibition of Chinese art which was "so popular" that there had already been plans made by July to hold another one. Ling opened an antique shop named the "Helen D. Ling Shop" at 97 Tanglin Road in May 1953. The shop "was an instant success, much admired and well-known to tourists, Singaporeans and collectors, primarily because of Helen’s knowledge and impeccable good taste in selecting the shop's inventory". Brothers and businessmen Stephen and Gilbert Zuellig began acquiring Chinese artworks through Ling, who introduced them to Chow, in 1950s. The Zuelligs were business associates of Tien Gi. William Holden, Elizabeth Taylor, Martha Graham and Barbara Bush were among the shop's visitors. According to her son, the business supported the family financially before Tien Gi's business took off. Ling would stock the shop with antiques supplied by Chinese dealers who had fled to Hong Kong. She also sold silks designed by Jim Thompson, becoming the first to import the silks into Singapore.

Ling began running the antiques section of a then newly-established interior decoration firm in July 1967. In 1969, she became the first president of the Southeast Asian Ceramic Society, a position which she held until 1970. From 1971 to 1980, she served as the society's vice-president. She became known as one of the "three doyennes of the Asian art world", along with Connie Mangskau and Charlotte Horstman. She lectured on Southeast Asian art. She also talked on Chinese art and ceramics on Rediffusion Singapore.

=== Collection ===
Ling's personal collection of antiques included cricket cages from across China, wine cups and stationery used by scholars in ancient China. When she left China, she hid small pieces of porcelain among the clothes in her trunk. In 1984, Thomas Lawton, the director of the Freer Gallery of Art, visited her home in Bethesda, Maryland, which housed her personal collection. He was "staggered" by the collection. The gallery then acquired around 30 pieces. This included three pieces of ceramics from the Shang dynasty which were over 3,000 years old. The collection was the "largest group of Chinese ceramics ever acquired at one time by the Freer". 32 pieces from Ling's collection, 23 of which were initially from Melchior's collection. The contents of the collection were described as "small in scale, thus especially pleasing to touch and closely examine… a sense of playfulness ran through the collection". The Arthur M. Sackler Gallery also houses items from her collection.

In January 1995, 98 pieces from her collection, with the oldest originating in the Eastern Zhou and the newest being from the late Qing dynasty, went on display at the University of Maryland, College Park. John Dorsey of The Baltimore Sun wrote that the exhibition demonstrated that Ling "was not attracted by the largest or flashiest objects" and that she "selected pieces that reflected their periods of creation and were distinguished by their rarity, integrity of form and restrained beauty." In August 1996, the university's art gallery held an exhibition at the art gallery of the Salisbury University featuring the same pieces from Ling's collection.

== Personal life and death ==
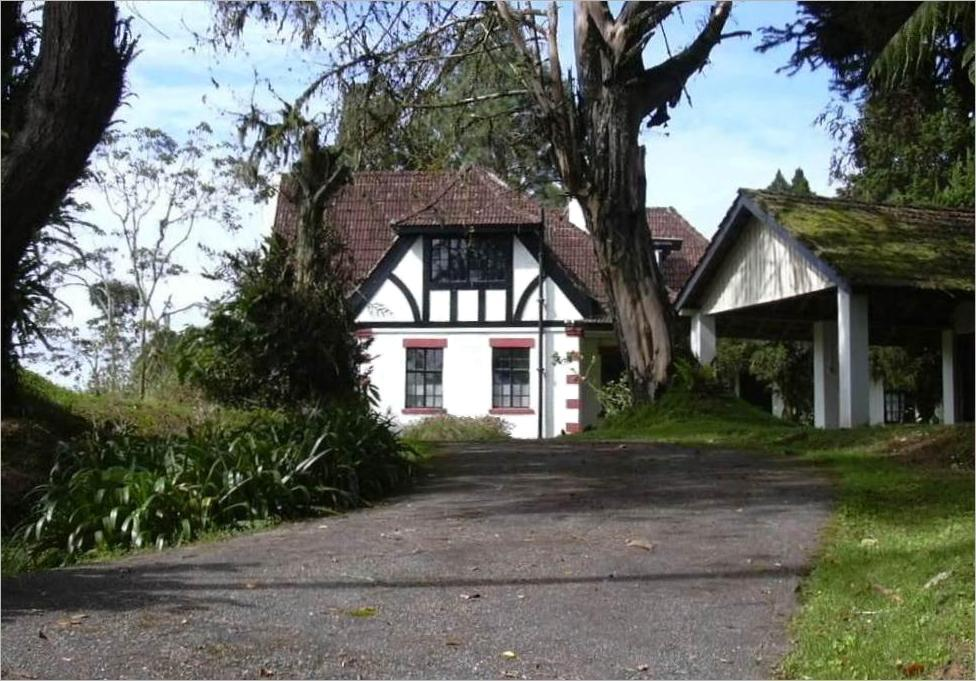
The Moonlight bungalow in 2002

Ling was married to Tien Gi Ling, a chemist. Together, they had a son named James, who was born while they were living in Wuhan. She stated in a 1957 interview with Esme Baptista that she believed that educated Chinese men were "easier to live with and more moderate in their ways of living" than their European counterparts. The couple spent seven years apart due to the war in China and were only reunited in 1946. The couple owned the Moonlight bungalow in the Cameron Highlands and frequently invited guests, including Mangskau and Thompson, to the property. Thompson disappeared after leaving the bungalow on 26 March 1967. Ling died in Singapore on 15 May 1982. A memorial service was held at the Orchard Road Presbyterian Church on 20 May.
