= Southeast Asian Ceramic Society =

The Southeast Asian Ceramic Society (SEACS) was founded in 1969 in Singapore. It is a member of the London-based Oriental Ceramic Society.

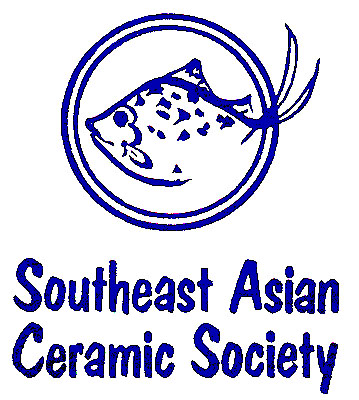

== Description ==
The society was the inspiration of William Willetts who gathered together a small group of established collectors and ceramic enthusiasts including George S. Cook, Frank Hickley, Pamela Hickley, Helen Ling, Norma Lu, Margaretha Ratnam, Trevor Rutter, Jo Rutter, C. K. Sng, Lu Sinclair, Don Sinclair, Y. H. (Mathew) Wong, and Adrian Zecha. Its first elected president was Helen Ling. She had many associates in the art world including the designer Jim Thompson; it was from the Lings' bungalow that Thompson disappeared in March 1967. The review by Henry D. Ginsburg singled out the uniqueness of their first publication and Willetts' appreciation of the aesthetic qualities of these previously unsung artefacts of the Asian ceramics world: "the world has been slow to recognize their quality."

Its members include the region's leading archaeologists. Wrecks such as the Turiang (a 14–16th century wreck) found by Sten Sjøstrand, whose ceramic cargo was studied by fellow member Roxanna Brown, have contributed to our knowledge of trade in Southeast Asia. Long-time member John Miksic was awarded Singapore's inaugural History Prize in 2018.

The historian John Guy noted that this “presentation of the then little known ceramic tradition of Thailand, Cambodia and Vietnam caused a stir amongst the oriental ceramic cognoscenti.” Furthermore, that "the Society inspired a generation of younger scholars and stimulated the interest of government archaeological departments throughout Southeast Asia.” As a consequence, ceramic societies were to emerge in ensuing years in West Malaysia, Jakarta, Manila and Hong Kong.

Other exhibitions followed: Chinese White Wares (1973), Chinese Blue & White Ceramics (1973), Chinese Celadons (1979), Khmer Ceramics 9th–14th Century (1981), Vietnamese Ceramics (1982), Song Ceramics (1983), Han Dynasty Ceramics (1991), Ceramics in Scholarly Taste (1992), each accompanied by a catalogue and most recently, a 50th anniversary commemorative exhibition (2019) held at the Singapore National Library when the society celebrated its 50th anniversary.

The society, which is based in Singapore, is open to all those interested in ceramics and particularly Southeast Asian ceramics and attracts scholars and collectors alike from around the world. It holds monthly meetings and lectures via ZOOM, participates in educational workshops, and arranges both local and overseas study trips as well as handling sessions for its Singapore-based members. The categories of membership include local, overseas and students. Many of its members are known experts in their fields and their publications are listed on the society's website.

== Presidents ==
- 1969–70 Helen Ling
- 1970–73 William Willetts
- 1973–75 George S. Cook
- 1975–78 Don R. H. Sinclair
- 1978–80 S. R. Parker
- 1980–81 Lu Yaw
- 1981–84 A. P. Rajah
- 1984–87 Earl Lu
- 1987–90 Steven Tan
- 1990–93 Kenson Kwok
- 1993–96 Lise Young Lai
- 1996–99 Pamela Hickley
- 1999-02 Lam Pin Foo
- 2002–05 Margaret Wang
- 2005–08 Marjorie Chu
- 2008–12 Alvin Chia
- 2012–17 Ingrid C. Hanson
- 2017–20 Patricia Bjaaland Welch
- 2020–21 Audrey Toh
- 2021–22 John N. Miksic

== Publications ==
- Chinese Blue and White Ceramics, Singapore, 1978
- Chinese Celadons and Other Related Wares in Southeast Asia, 1979
- Chinese White Wares, 1973
- Khmer Ceramics, 1981, ISBN 9971-83-001-9
- Lau, Aileen (ed.), Spirit of Han, 1991, ISBN 981 00 2961 6
- Lu Yaw (ed.), Song Ceramics, 1983
- Miksic, John N (ed), New Light on Old Pottery, 2009, ISBN 978-981-4260-13-8
- Rinaldi, Maura, Ceramics in Scholarly Taste, 1993, ISBN 981 00 4395 3
- Young, Carol M. et al., Vietnamese Ceramics, 1982, ISBN 0 19 582558 6
- Welch, Patricia Bjaaland, Southeast Asian Ceramic Society 1969–2019, 2019, ISBN 978-981-14-2675-9
- Willets, William, An Angkor Roundabout, 2017
- Willetts, William, Ceramic Art of Southeast Asia, 1971
