= Captain Cook, Putney =

Pub in Putney, London, England

Coordinates: 51.4640338°N 0.2330318°W

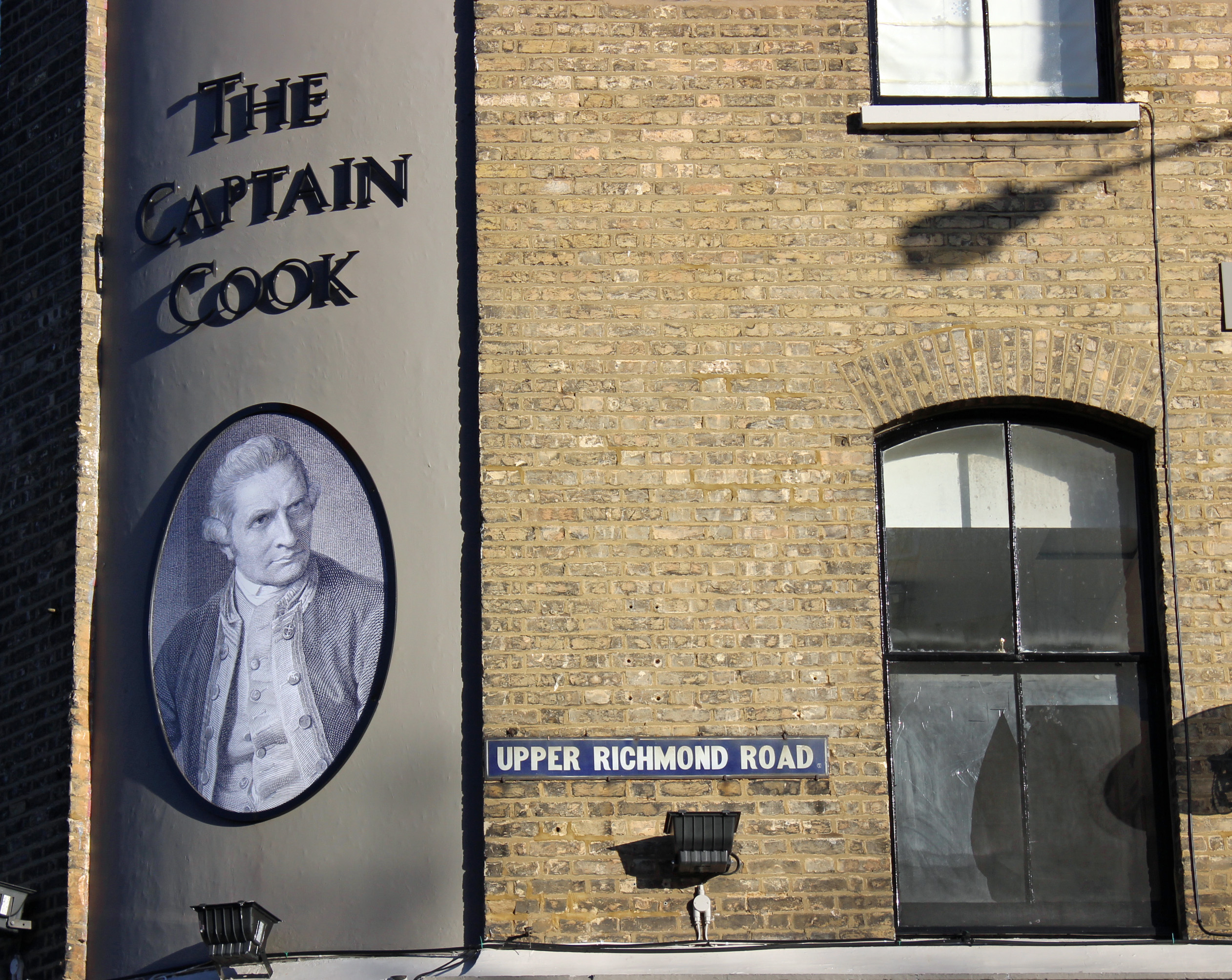

The Captain Cook was a pub in Putney, London.

== Location ==
The pub was on the north side of the Upper Richmond road, at number 408, on the corner of Dyers lane.

== History ==
The pub was originally called the Northumberland Arms and was managed by Young & Co, in the 1950s it featured in a painting by local artist Roy Newby (1912 - 2011). The pub was also called the West Putney Tavern and in 1994 became the first of the Jim Thompson Flaming Wok chain oriental themed bars, named after the designer Jim Thompson, and won the 1998 Carlton Pub Restaurant of The Year.

The later Captain Cook name was inspired by the explorer Captain Cook, but the pub eventually closed on Christmas Eve in 2013 and is now a Sainsbury's Local convenience store.
