= Disappearance of Jim Thompson =

1967 missing person case in Malaysia

Jim Thompson
- Born: James Harrison Wilson Thompson; March 21, 1906; Greenville, Delaware, U.S.
- Disappeared: March 26, 1967 (aged 61); Cameron Highlands, Malaysia
- Status: Missing for 59 years, 6 months and 29 days
- Known for: being a spy during World War II.; reviving the Thai silk industry in the 1950s/1960s.; disappearing from the Cameron Highlands without a trace.

James Harrison Wilson Thompson, an American businessman who helped revitalise the Thai silk industry in the 1950s and 1960s, vanished in Malaysia's Cameron Highlands on March 26, 1967. The mysterious circumstances surrounding the case created a significant amount of media coverage. Over the years, many theories have been advanced to explain his disappearance.

== Disappearance ==
Thompson disappeared from Malaysia's Cameron Highlands while going for a walk on Sunday, March 26, 1967. Prior to his disappearance, he left Bangkok to spend a day in Penang with Constance "Connie" Mangskau, his longtime acquaintance. On Friday, March 24, they headed for the highlands to holiday at the "Moonlight" bungalow (now the Jim Thompson cottage). Their hosts were Ling Tien Gi, a Singaporean chemist, and Helen Ling, his American-born wife.

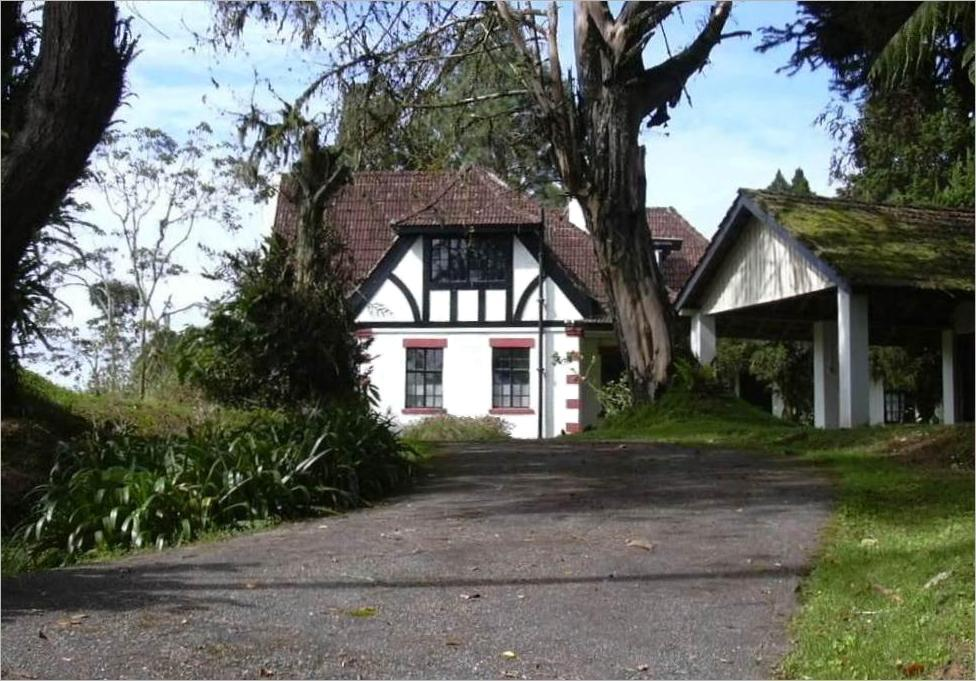
"Moonlight" bungalow: The cottage is located at A47 Jalan Kamunting. The place is a draw for those with an interest in the disappearance of Jim Thompson in the Cameron Highlands.

On Sunday, all four got up early to attend morning services at All Souls' Church. While the rest were preparing themselves for the service, Thompson informed them he would take a walk down Kamunting Road (Malay: Jalan Kamunting). After walking about 2 kilometres (1.2 mi), Thompson reached the main road (Jalan Besar). This was the first time he was alone, for approximately 20 minutes. Later, he met up with the others, and they all drove on to church.

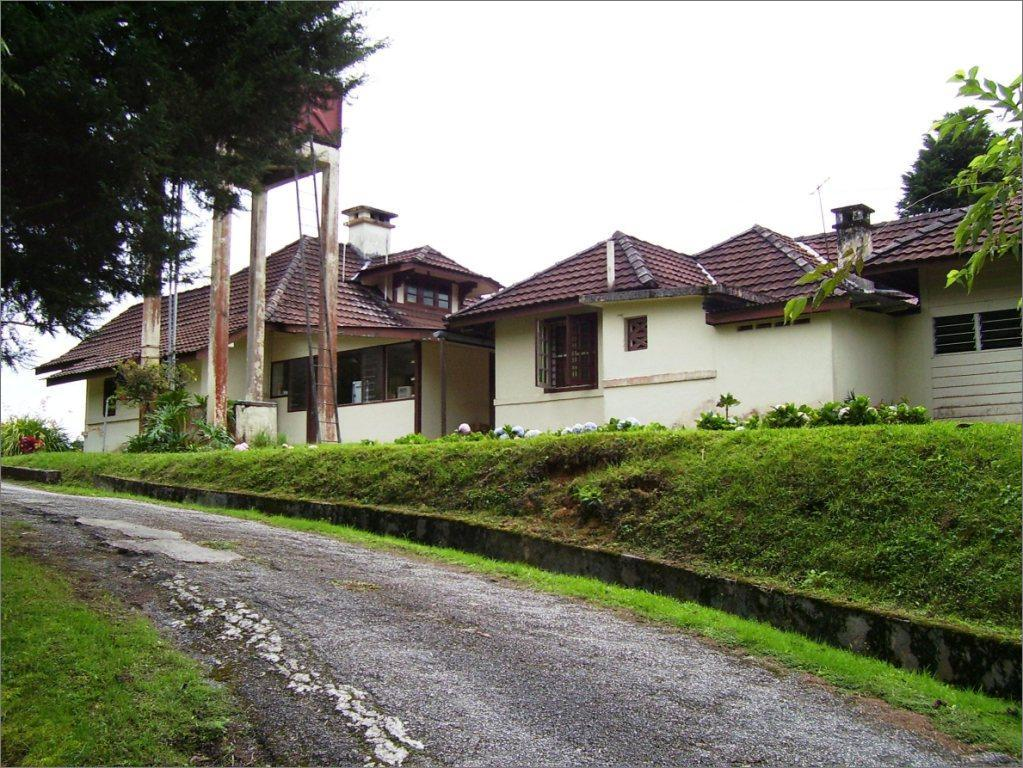
Lutheran Mission bungalow: The chalet is located at A45 Jalan Kamunting. It is about 1.5 kilometres from the "Moonlight" bungalow.

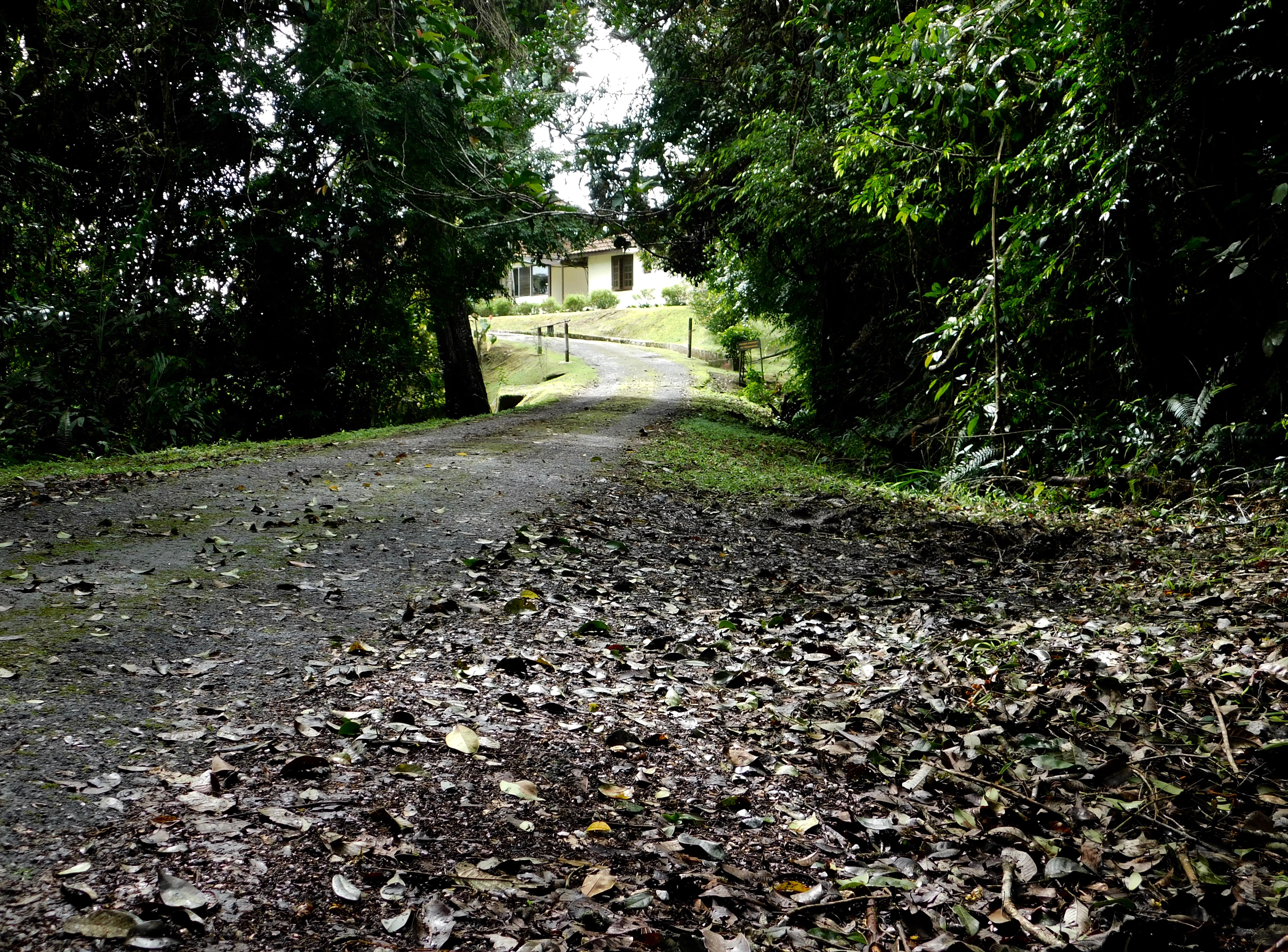
Driveway leading to the Lutheran Mission bungalow: When Thompson left the Lutheran home (background), he came into contact with the driver of a white car (foreground). After a brief exchange of words, the driver drove off.

The Easter service lasted for more than an hour. When it ended, at noon, the group returned to the "Moonlight" bungalow for lunch. At 1:30 pm, Thompson left the bungalow for an afternoon stroll. Before leaving, he waved goodbye to Helen Ling and Connie Mangskau. They saw him depart the estate via the bungalow's only access road, Jalan Kamunting.

Thompson was in the Kamunting precinct for more than two hours. At around 4 pm, a cook from the Lutheran Mission bungalow (4.49119°N 101.37655°E) saw him when he visited the chalet. He did not stay and failed to return to the "Moonlight" bungalow (4.49263°N 101.37745°E) before 6 pm.

An intense search was conducted after the police declared Thompson lost, involving more than 500 people. This included the army, the Malaysian police field force, Orang Asli trekkers, Gurkhas, reward hunters, tourists, residents, mystics, scouts, missionaries, adventure seekers, American school students, and British servicemen convalescing at the resort. At the end of the hunt, Thompson was not found, and no clues were unearthed. The official search lasted 11 days, and sporadic additional searching went on for months.

The case generated worldwide publicity and intense speculation, with most press reports and analysts contending that Thompson had been kidnapped (although no ransom note was forthcoming); murdered (although no body was ever found); had voluntarily left to do secret work in resolving the Vietnam War (although no evidence was presented); or was eliminated by business rivals (although no evidence of this emerged).

== Brinchang remains theory ==
One researcher believes a clue to Thompson's disappearance may lie in some bone fragments that were found at the Cameron Highlands in 1985.

PLANNED DISAPPEARANCE

I still insist, like others who know far more about the affair than I do, that he [Thompson] disappeared by his own choice and will, and not by force.

— Richard Hughes

The remains, without the skull, were discovered by Orang Asli settlers in a grave at the edge of a vegetable plot off the main road in Brinchang.

Philip J. Rivers, a master mariner, said he learned of the discovery from a health officer while researching Thompson's disappearance in 2007. The police collected the fragments, but no connection was made to Thompson's disappearance in Tanah Rata, as they were found in Brinchang.

"The probability is that his body lay undiscovered in the thick under bush, hidden in an unmarked grave after a hit-and-run accident. A DNA test on the bones might possibly provide a fuller answer", said Rivers at a lecture organised by the Perak Academy in Ipoh on March 26, 2010.

To date, there has been no confirmation that the bones belong to Thompson. According to Rivers, however, "the bones are presently kept in a safe and secure place".

== Search-and-rescue analysis ==
In 2015, an analysis, report, and four news articles were done by Llewellyn "Lew" Toulmin (see § External links) of the 1967 investigation from a search-and-rescue (SAR) and scientific point of view. This analysis drew on interviews with a leader of and participants in the search; on interviews with other actors; on principles and mathematical formulae developed by the US National Association for Search and Rescue (NASAR); on reviews of FBI, OSS, CIA, and US Department of State material on the case, and on Thompson; as well as various other sources.

The analysis concluded that:

- The 1967 search delivered about 1,448 person-days of searching, a substantial number, but likely not enough to cover all the 17.7 square miles (46 km^{2}) that were estimated in 1967 to be the target segment in the Cameron Highlands area.
- The "probability of success" (as defined by NASAR) of the 1967 search, calculated by the "probability of area" (likelihood that Thompson was in the searched segment vs. some other nearby segment) times the "probability of detection" (likelihood of finding the subject in the searched segment), was in the range of 43 to 30 percent or less, meaning that there was a fairly high chance that the search missed Thompson's body, if it was in fact present in the general search area.
- Various possible, likely, or certain errors in search tactics and execution reduced the quality of the search effort, and the massive nature of the search made it almost certain (and even arguably provable mathematically) that just because it was the "biggest land search in Malaysian history", it was almost certainly not the "best search in Malaysian history".
- Three bloodhound-type dogs searched the "Moonlight" bungalow (the "last known point", or LKP) for scent trails of Thompson and did not find any going down the only access road or into the jungle. This led the Malaysian police early on to conclude that Thompson left the area in a car, thus breaking the scent trail (this bloodhound search information was not revealed previously); but this evidence is not conclusive.
- A possible sighting of Thompson in Tahiti took place several months after the disappearance, but this sighting is not certain.
- Remains called "the bones of Jim Thompson" did exist, in that some unknown bones were at one time in the Tanah Rata District Medical Office, but the bones were never proved to be human, were probably not connected to the Thompson case, and have since disappeared in an office move.
- Of the 25 possible causes for the disappearance cited by the press in 1967, about half can be eliminated as not credible.
- Of the eyewitnesses who may have seen Thompson after he left the LKP, two can be eliminated as being too far (as measured on Google Earth) from Thompson to be credible, and the rest are of fairly low to very low credibility.
- The literature on the decomposition of bodies in various climates shows that if Thompson's remains are in the jungle, they are likely to be spread over 1 to 4 square miles (2.6 to 10.4 km^{2}), due to predation.

The Toulmin report concludes that the probability (but not certainty) is that Thompson's remains are still in the Cameron Highlands, and that a possible way to move the case forward is to use proven SAR techniques of detailed scenario development and human remains detection, or "cadaver dogs".

The Toulmin analysis also reviewed the brutal, still unsolved murder of Thompson's sister in Chester County, Pennsylvania, just a few months after Thompson disappeared. The analysis drew on an interview with the Pennsylvania State Police cold case officer; on a review of the wills and estate administrations of Thompson, his sister, and his sister's son; on interviews with neighbors and residents; and on contemporary (1967) news sources. The analysis concluded there is no provable link between the Thompson disappearance and the murder of his sister; that the two cases are unlikely to be related; and that several persons of interest can be named, but there is no proof against any of them.

The Toulmin report contains over 500 pages of primary-source material on the Thompson disappearance and the murder of his sister; this is the only such compilation available. The material includes CIA, OSS, FBI, and US Department of State material, maps of the search area, 200 pages of previously unpublished letters from Thompson to a former lover and fellow art collector, detailed interviews with various actors, photos, and exact latitude and longitude of all the key locations (including possible witness locations), among other items.

== See also ==
- List of people who disappeared mysteriously: 1910–1990
