= William Willetts (art historian) =

British scholar of South-East Asian art studies

William Young Willetts (28 November 1918, Purton Stoke – 30 January 1995, Kuala Lumpur) was a British scholar of South-East Asian art studies who wrote several books and served as curator of the National University of Singapore art museum from 1963 to 1972. During his years in Singapore, he was the impetus behind the gathering of ceramic collectors and artists that led to the founding of the Southeast Asian Ceramic Society. He curated the society's first exhibition on Southeast Asian ceramics, which showcased ceramics from both the museum as well as members' collections, and authored the accompanying catalogue. The catalogue won the praise of Henry D. Ginsburg who reviewed it in the Journal of the Siam Society, noting Willetts' "appreciation of the aesthetic qualities of these previously unsung artefacts of the Asian ceramics world." When the decision was made to close the National University of Singapore's art museum in 1972, Willetts relocated to Kuala Lumpur where he served as Curator of the Muzium Seni Asia, the Museum of the Arts of Asia, University of Malaya. He died in the Universiti Malaya Hospital in Kuala Lumpur, Malaysia on 29 January 1995 at the age of 76.

His scholarly writing included:

- Willetts, William. Foundations of Chinese art: from neolithic pottery to modern architecture. 456 pp., including 322 photos. London: Thames and Hudson, 1965.
- Willetts, William. Chinese art. (Pelican Books, A 358, 359.) 2 vols.:xxxv, 392 pp.; vi, 393–802 pp.; 64 plates, map. Harmondsworth: Penguin Books, 1958.
- Willetts, William. Chinese Calligraphy: Its History and Aesthetic Motivation. The Record of an Exhibition of Chinese Calligraphic Art Held in the University of Malaya 1977, Kuala Lumpur: Oxford University Press, 1981. ISBN 0 19 580478 3
- The Southeast Asian Ceramic Society posthumously published his unfinished manuscript as an e-publication in 2017, which is downloadable from their website, An Angkor Roundabout: Being a Five-Day Tour of the Main Monuments at Angkor in Cambodia described in the order in which they were built.
