= John N. Miksic =

American archaeologist (1946–2025)

John Norman Miksic (October 29, 1946 – October 25, 2025) was an American-born archaeologist. Based primarily at the National University of Singapore, he was called "the Indiana Jones of Singapore's history".

== Life and career ==
John Norman Miksic was born in Rochester, New York, on October 29, 1946. His interest in archaeology began at an early age and inspired his future career as a historian and archaeologist. In 1968, he received a B.A. in anthropology from Dartmouth College (Hanover, New Hampshire). He served as a Peace Corps volunteer in Malaysia from 1968 to 1972 where he helped set up a farmers' cooperative and developed an irrigation system in the Bujang Valley in Kedah, before returning to the U.S. to earn an M.A. from the Department of International Affairs, Ohio University (Athens, Ohio) in 1974.

In 1976, he was awarded a second M.A. from Cornell University's Department of Anthropology, followed by a Ph.D. in January 1979, during which time he was awarded the Lauriston Sharp Award for Best Ph.D. Dissertation in the Southeast Asian Studies Program in 1978. You can still find and read John's thesis "Archaeology, Trade and Society in Northeast Sumatra" from January 1979 at this site. Upon graduation, Miksic worked for USAID as a Rural Development Advisor in Bengkulu for two years, and taught archaeological theory at Gadjah Mada University, Yogyakarta for six years. In 1987 he moved to Singapore, where he joined the Department of History, National University of Singapore (NUS), and helped to found the Southeast Asian Studies Programme in 1991.

Miksic was Head of the Archaeology Unit, Nalanda-Sriwijaya Unit, ISEAS 2010–2013, and was a member of the board of the Center for Khmer Studies based in Siem Reap, Cambodia for 15 years. He is currently emeritus professor, Department of Southeast Asian Studies (NUS) and a Senior Research Fellow under the School of Humanities, Nanyang Technological University (NTU).

He also taught at various centres including archaeological field schools, the University of Yangon's Department of Archaeology, the Center for Khmer Studies, and the Jingdezhen Ceramic Institute. His work is often described as both "impressive" and "inspirational" and has been described as having "performed a great service for the field, ... one hopes it will inspire future students to take up the study of ancient Southeast Asia."

His field work included major archaeological work across the region including such world-renowned sites as Borobudur in Indonesia, and more than a dozen sites in Singapore, including St. Andrew's Cathedral, Empress Place, Parliament House and Padang.

Miksic has significantly impacted Singapore students as they are now learning that Singapore has a long and rich pre-Raffles history in the new history textbook for lower secondary school students that incorporates his findings and field work. He relocated permanently to Southeast Asia in 1979 and has been a resident of Singapore since 1987. He is married to Singaporean archaeologist Dr Goh Geok Yian (NTU).

He served on a large number of advisory boards and committees including the Asian Cultural Council (New York City, 1981–87), the Lee Kong Chian Art Museum (1991–1993), the National Museum of Singapore Development Committee (1990–1992), the executive committee of the Field School of Indonesian Archaeology (1989–1993), Book Review editor positions on the Journal of Southeast Asian Studies (1995–1999), the Council of the Southeast Asian Ceramic Society from 1989 and President of the council from 2021, and the Institute of Southeast Asian Studies Yusuf Ishak Institute (2010–2013).

Sometimes referred to as "the Indiana Jones of Singapore's history", he has been cited as being one of the key figures who has changed historians' impressions of Southeast Asian history. As C. M. Turnbull of the University of Hong Kong wrote, the work of Miksic and his colleagues "will challenge historians to look at Singapore afresh in an attempt to re-unite twenty-first century Singapore with its distant past." He is perhaps best known for being the archaeologist who discovered archaeological evidence for Singapore's importance as an early major regional port, for literally "identifying it as a centre of commerce and culture in the 14th century." As a result of Miksic's years of research and work, Singapore schools revised their secondary school curriculum. He was the winner of the inaugural Singapore History Prize awarded in 2018 for his book Singapore and The Silk Road of the Sea, 1300-1800.

Miksic died from pneumonia on October 25, 2025, at the age of 78. (Note: Sources mislabel his age as "79".)

== Selected publications ==
A list of Miksic's publications, articles and conference papers may be downloaded as a .pdf from this site.

=== e-Publications ===
- I Wayan Ardika and the Archaeology Study Program Team, Universitas Udayana. Edited and Translated from Indonesian by John N. Miksic. Archaeological Research at the Blanjong Site, Sanur, Bali. Singapore: Nalanda-Sriwijaya Centre Archaeology Unit Archaeology Report Series No. 3. June 2016. https://www.iseas.edu.sg/images/pdf/archaeology_report_blanjong_ardika_final.pdf Pp. 50.
- John Miksic, Southeast Asian Archaeological Site Reports Singapore No. 1: The Singapore Cricket Club Excavation. February 20, 2018, Southeast Asian Archaeological Site Reports, http://epress.nus.edu.sg/sitereports/ DOI: https://doi.org/10.25717/7w0e-3n3c
- Team Projek Dieng 2010: Jurusan Arkeologi, Fakultas Ilmu Budaya, and Universitas Gadjah Mada. Translated by Goh Geok Yian and John N. Miksic. Editors: Mahirta Sasongko, Goh Geok Yian, Widya Nayati, and John N. Miksic. Dieng Temple Complex Excavation Report. Southeast Asian Archaeological Site Reports, http://epress.nus.edu.sg/sitereports/dieng DOI: https://doi.org/10.25717/70d9-va60
- Goh Geok Yian & John N. Miksic, Myanmar-Singapore Archaeology Training Project (MSATP). Southeast Asian Archaeological Site Reports http://epress.nus.edu.sg/sitereports/msatp, DOI: https://doi.org/10.25717/4vsn-x426
- Goh Geok Yian & John N. Miksic, The Colombo Court Site Report. Southeast Asian Archaeological Site Reports epress.nus.edu.sg/sitereports/colombo/ DOI: https://doi.org/10.25717/304q-mx31
- Goh Geok Yian & John N. Miksic, Site Report on the Fort Canning Dig 2018 (September 2 – November 4) and Two Subsequent Visits. Southeast Asian Archaeological Site Reports, epress.nus.edu.sg/sitereports/fortcanning/ DOI: https://doi.org/10.25717/ngs9-h5qr
- Goh Geok Yian & John N. Miksic, The Fort Canning Spice Garden Site Report. Southeast Asian Archaeological Site Reports, epress.nus.edu.sg/sitereports/spicegarden/ DOI: https://doi.org/10.25717/q0b4-byj0

=== Editored volumes ===
- Hasan M. Ambary, Halwany Michrob, and John N. Miksic. Katalogus Koleksi Data Arkeologi Banten (Catalogue of Sites, Monuments and Artifacts of Banten). Jakarta: Directorate for Protection and Development of Historical and Archaeological Heritage 1988 pp. xv, 1–92.
- Pusaka Art of Indonesia. Singapore: Archipelago Press 1992. [French Edition: Pusaka Arts d'Indonésie, Singapore: Les Éditions du Pacifique, 1994. ISBN 978-2878680157] [Dutch edition: Pusaka: Indonesische Kunstschatten. Alphen aan den Rijn: Tripolis, 1994. ISBN 9789061137290]
- The Legacy of Majapahit. Singapore: National Heritage Board, 1995. pp. 1–210. ISBN 9971-88-453-4
- Southeast Asia: A Past Regained. Alexandria: Time-Life Books, 1995. ISBN 0-8094-9112-5
- Museum Treasures of Southeast Asia from the Collections of the National Museums of the Ten Members of the Association of Southeast Asian Nations. Makati, Singapore: ArtPost Asia, 2002. ISBN 981-04-7589-6
- Earthenware in Southeast Asia. Singapore: Singapore University Press, 2003. ISBN 9971-69-271-6
- John N. Miksic and Cheryl-Ann Low Mei Gek. Early Singapore 1300s–1819: Evidence in Maps, Text and Artefacts. Singapore: Singapore History Museum, 2004. ISBN 981-05-0283-4
- Karaton Surakarta. Jakarta: Yayasan Pawiyatan Kabudayan Karaton Surakarta, 2004. Pp. 1–409. ISBN 9 789799 858603 Singapore: Marshall Cavendish, 2006. ISBN 981-261-226-2
- Retno Sulistianingsih Sitowati and John N. Miksic, Icons of Art: National Museum Jakarta. Jakarta: BAB Publishing Indonesia, 2006. Pp. ISBN 979-8926-25-0 Second Edition: John N. Miksic, Icons of Art: National Museum Jakarta. Jakarta: BAB Publishing Indonesia. ISBN 978-979-8926-25-9
- Dominik Bonatz, John Miksic, J. David Neidel, Mai Lin Tjoa Bonatz, Editors. From Distant Tales. Archaeology and Ethnohistory in the Highlands of Sumatra. Newcastle upon Tyne: Cambridge Scholars Publishing. 2009. Pp. xiv, 509. ISBN 1-4438-0497-5, 978-1-4438-0497-4
- Southeast Asian Ceramics: New Light on Old Pottery. Singapore: Southeast Asian Ceramic Society, 2009. ISBN 978-981-4260-13-8
- Borobudur Majestic Mysterious Magnificent. Yogyakarta: PT. (Persero) Taman Wisata Borobudur, Prambanan & Ratu Boko, 2010. ISBN 978-602-98279-0-3 US Edition: North Clarendon, Vermont: Periplus Editions – Tuttle Publishing. ISBN 978-979-89262-6-6 Review: Peter, Stephenson, Java Kini, October 2011: p. 20.
- John N. Miksic, Geok Yian Goh, and Sue O'Connor, Rethinking Cultural Resource Management in Southeast Asia. Preservation, Development, and Neglect. London, New York: Anthem Press. 2011. ISBN 9780857283894
