= Thai silk =

Silk from the cocoons of Thai silkworms

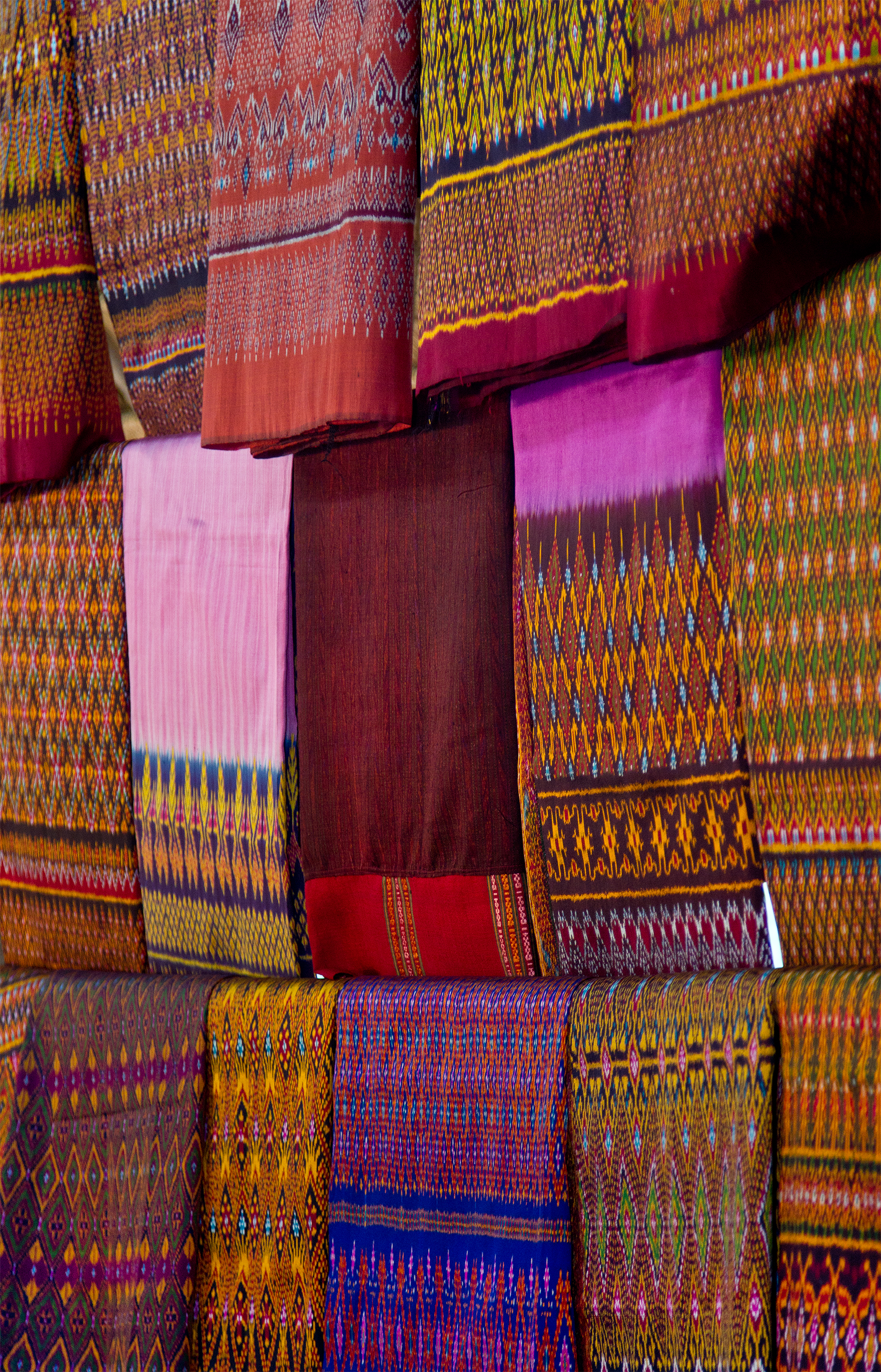
Traditional Thai silk cloth

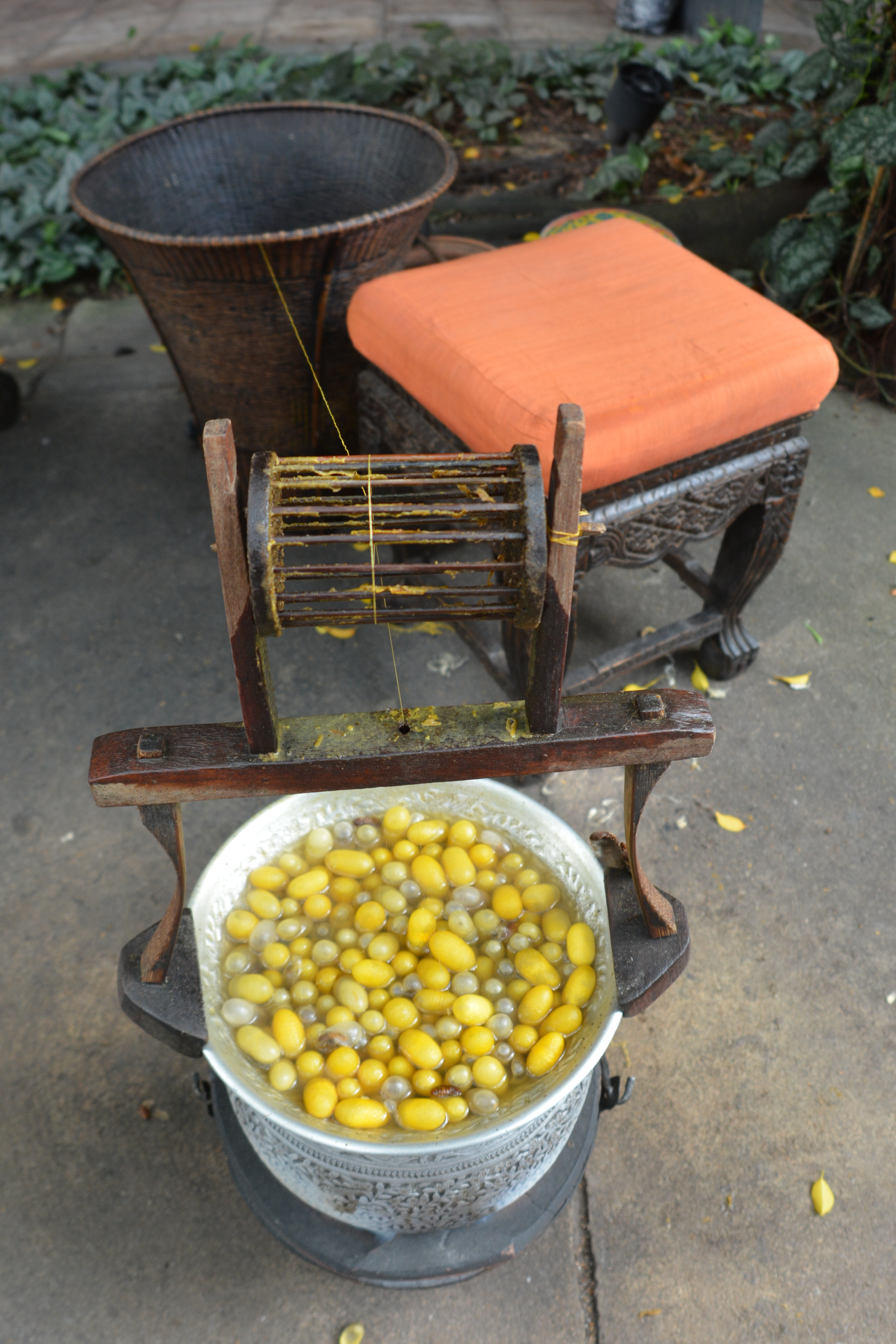
Silk cocoons and spool at Jim Thompson House

Thai silk (Thai: ผ้าไหมไทย, RTGS: pha mai thai, pronounced [pʰâː mǎj tʰāj]) is produced from the cocoons of Thai silkworms. Thailand's silkworm farmers cultivate both types of the domesticated silkworms that produce commercial silk: Samia ricini, commonly known as the eri silkworm, which produces matte eri silk, and the Bombyx mori, producer of the better known, glossy mulberry silk. The latter is by far the larger silk producer of the two.

In Thailand, the Center for Excellence in Silk at Kasetsart University's Kamphaeng Saen campus plays a leading role in sericulture research as well as providing silkworm eggs and know-how to Thai farmers.

== History ==
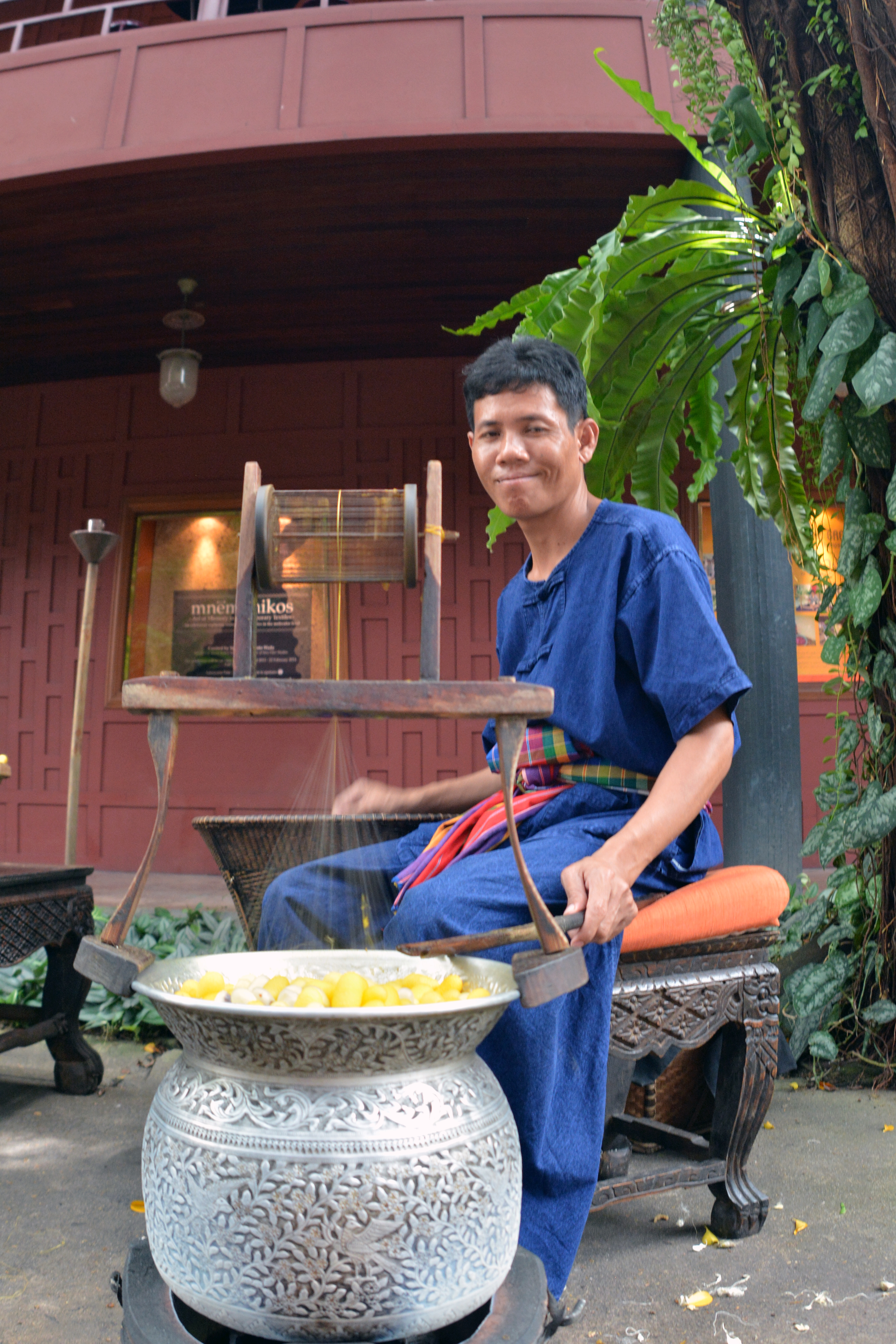
Thai man spools silk at Jim Thompson House

After silk originated in ancient China and India, where the practice of weaving silk began around 2,640 BCE, Chinese merchants spread the use of silk throughout Asia through trade. Archaeologists found the first fibers of silk in Thailand to be over 3,000 years old, in the ruins of Ban Chiang. The site is considered to be one of Southeast Asia's oldest civilizations.

According to Chinese diplomat Zhou Daguan, who was sent to Cambodia by Temür Khan, Siamese people were skilled in silk production: “In recent years people from Siam have come to live in Cambodia, and unlike the locals they engage in silk production. The mulberry trees they grow and the silkworms they raise all come from Siam. (They have no ramie, either, only hemp.) They themselves weave the silk into clothes made of a black, patterned satiny silk. Siamese women do know how to stitch and darn, so when local people have torn or damaged clothing they ask them to do the mending.” Based on Anna Harriette Leonowens's record, Siam were also the exporters of cotton, silk, and raw silk.

However, silk produced on the Khorat Plateau was generally only used for private consumption, with the Thai court preferring to purchase Chinese silk imports. There was an attempt in the early 20th century to develop the native industry with the help of a Japanese sericulture expert, Kametaro Toyama. However, this attempt failed, due to a lack of local interest in producing for a larger market.

After World War II, former OSS officer Jim Thompson thought that silk would be popular back home in the USA. Through his connections in New York, he began marketing the product as a traditional Siamese fabric. In fact, the material he created had little relationship to what had previously been produced in the country. But through clever branding and by developing a range of "Thai" patterns, he managed to establish Thai silk as a recognizable brand.

Writing in the Bangkok Post in 1949, Alexander MacDonald noted that, "...out of a number of scattered remains of history, from cultures borrowed from Siam's neighbors, and from colonies of fat and lazy Siamese silk worms, Jim Thompson is trying to build a modest business." Throughout the 1950s, Thais remained little interested in Thai silk, and considered it suitable only for special occasions. Rather, it was American tourists who sustained the local development of a silk industry in Thailand. In 1951, The King and I opened on Broadway, featuring a depiction of the Thai court in the mid-19th century, where the costumes were all made using Thai silk. Created by Irene Sharaff, the production served to promote the material to the American audience, and fueled interest in the country.

Throughout the 1950s, silk shops opened up across Bangkok. However, these shops sold almost entirely to the tourist trade. Wealthy Americans would come into Jim Thompson's shop and buy large amounts of the fabric, and then take the fabric home to be sewn into clothing. Locally, Thais showed little interest in the product, as it remained expensive and unsuited to the hot climate.

== Production ==
The Queen Sirikit Department of Sericulture estimates that in 2013, 71,630 small landholders raised mulberry silkworms on 39,570 rai, producing 287,771 kg of silk cocoons. Another 2,552 farmers grew mulberry silkworms on an industrial scale, producing 145,072 kg of silk on 15,520 rai of land. Eri silk production, on the other hand, amounts to only a fraction of these quantities, grown by a small network of 600 families scattered throughout 28 provinces in north, northeast, and central Thailand.

== Exports ==
In 2006, US$14,540,325 worth of silk was exported from Thailand. The predominant markets are the US and the UK. Silk fabric accounts for about half of the silk exported from Thailand (the rest being raw silk, yarn, cocoons, and silk waste). However, Thailand remains only a small contributor to the global trade in silk. China produces 100,000 tonnes of silk a year, 80 percent of the global market, while Thai silk exports account for just 0.1 percent of global production, with most Thai silk used locally.

== Mulberry silk ==
=== Weaving ===
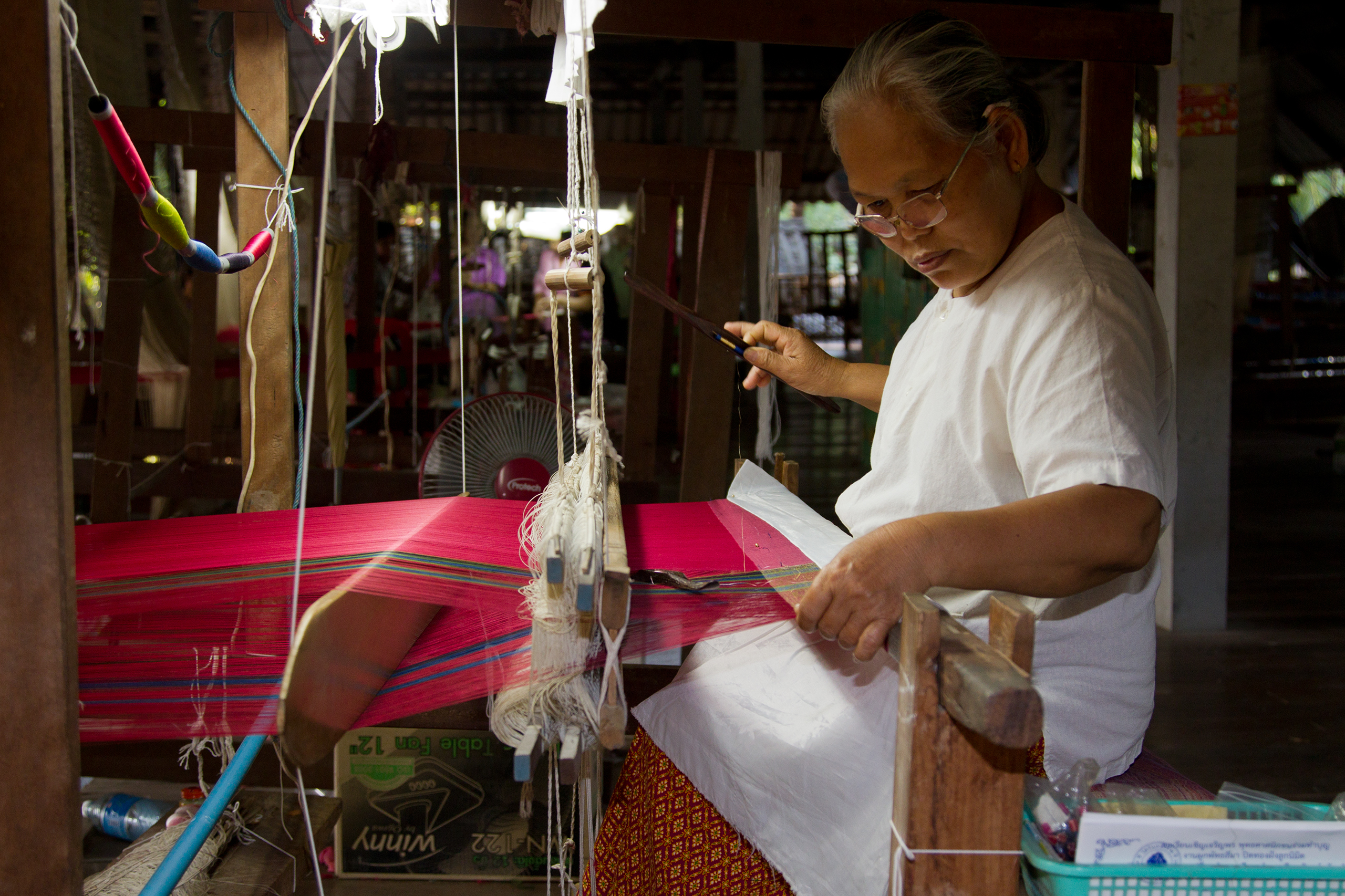
Weaving Thai silk, Surin Province

The production of Thai silk begins with the Bombyx mori, a small silk worm that comes from the eggs of a silk moth. For their first year, these worms feast on the leaves of mulberry trees, before building a cocoon with their spittle.

In its original cocoon form, raw silk is bumpy and irregular. Thai weavers separate the completed cocoons from the mulberry bush and soak them in a vat of boiling water to separate the silk thread from the caterpillar inside the cocoon.

The Bombyx mori usually produces silk thread of varying colors, ranging from light gold to very light green, with lengths varying from 500 to 1,500 yards per cocoon.

A single thread filament is too thin to use on its own, so Thai women combine many threads to produce a thicker, usable fiber. They do this by hand-reeling the threads onto a wooden spindle to produce a uniform strand of raw silk. The process is a tedious one, as it takes nearly 40 hours to produce a half kilogram of Thai silk.

Many local operations use a reeling machine for this task, but the majority of most silk thread is still hand-reeled. The difference is that hand-reeled threads produce three grades of silk: two fine grades that are ideal for lightweight fabrics, and a thick grade for heavier material.

The silk fabric is then soaked in hot water and bleached before dyeing in order to remove the natural yellow coloring of Thai silk yarn. To do this, skeins of silk thread are immersed in large tubs of hydrogen peroxide. Once washed and dried, the silk is then woven using a traditional hand-operated loom.

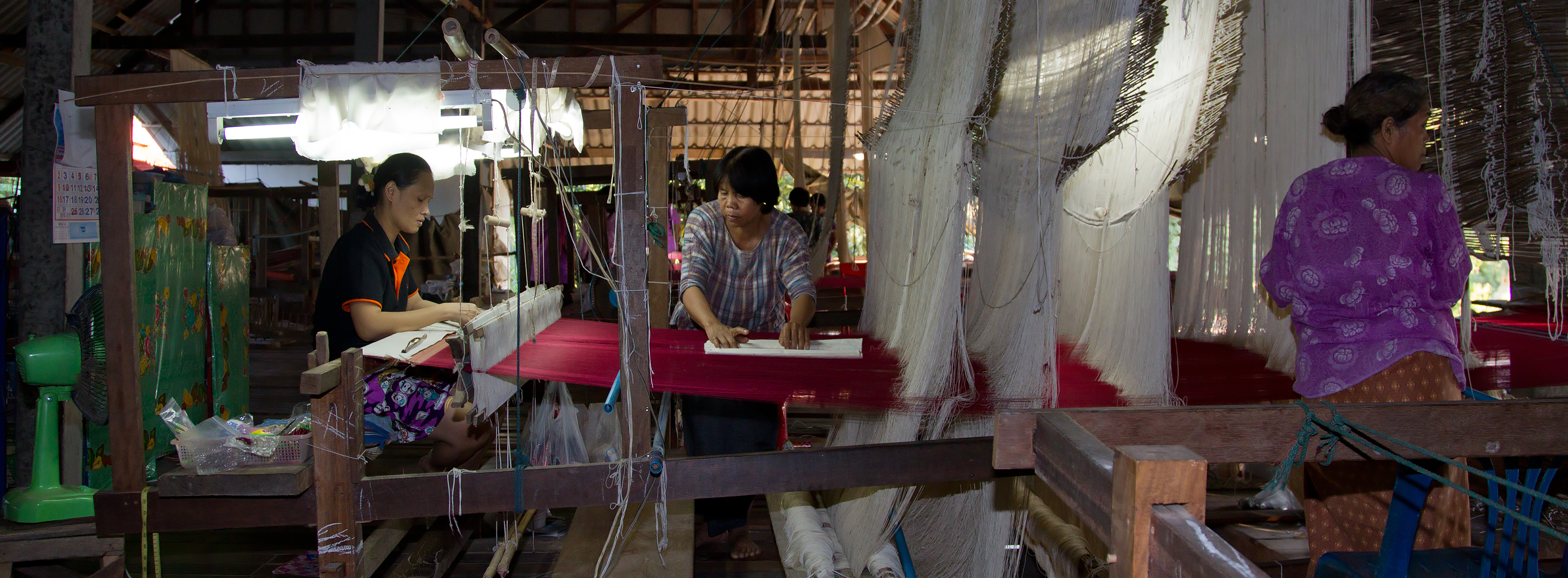
Operating a traditional hand loom, Surin

== Eri silk ==
Eri silk is a staple fiber, unlike other silks, which are a continuous filament. It was introduced to Thailand from South Asia in the 1970s. The texture of the fabric is coarse, fine, and dense. It is strong, durable, and elastic. Eri silk is darker and heavier than other silks, and blends well with wool and cotton. Due to its thermal properties, it is warm in winter and cool in summer. The fibre is "cottony", not glossy like mulberry silk. The cocoons of eri silkworms are open-ended, meaning the grown larvae can leave via the opening. This has led to eri silk being termed "peace silk" or ahimsa silk as its production harms no living organisms. Mulberry silkworms, on the other hand, make a hole in the cocoon when emerging as moths, thus damaging the silk. To prevent the damage, processors boil the mulberry cocoons to kill the larvae, leading organisations such as PETA to blacklist mulberry silk.

== Types of Thai silk ==
To be able to identify genuine Thai mulberry silk easily, Thailand's Agriculture Ministry uses a peacock emblem to authenticate Thai silk and protect it from imitations. They are:

- Gold peacock: Indicates premium Royal Thai Silk, a product of native Thai silkworm breeds and traditional hand-made production.
- Silver peacock: Indicates Classic Thai Silk, developed from specific silkworm breeds and hand-made production.
- Blue peacock: Indicates Thai Silk, a product of pure silk threads and with no specific production method (allows chemical dyes).
- Green peacock: Indicates Thai Silk Blend, a product of silk blended with other fabrics and with no specific production method.

== Identification of genuine silk ==
As traditional Thai silk is hand woven, each silk fabric is unique and cannot be duplicated by commercial means. In contrast, artificial silk is machine woven, which means that every part of the fabric is identical and has the same color.

In addition, Thai silk has a unique lustre, with a sheen that has two unique blends: one color for the warp and another for the weft. Its color will change when viewed at varying angles to light.

Thai silk smells like hair when burned. The silk is similar to the composition of human hair and fingernails. When the flame is removed, Thai silk immediately stops burning. Artificial silk smells like plastic when burned and continues to burn even if the flame is removed.

In terms of price, Thai silk is usually 10 times more expensive than artificial silk.

Examples of varieties of Thai silks protected as geographical indications include Lamphun Brocade, Chonnabot Mudmee and Phrae Wa Kalasin.

Queen Sirikit was introduced to Phrae Wa during a visit to Kalasin province in 1977. Phrae Wa is the only silk that is formally recognized as the “Queen of Thai Silk” due to its intricate patterns, vibrant colors, shinning texture, and unyielding beauty. These are on display in the Queen Sirikit Museum of Textiles.

== Gallery ==
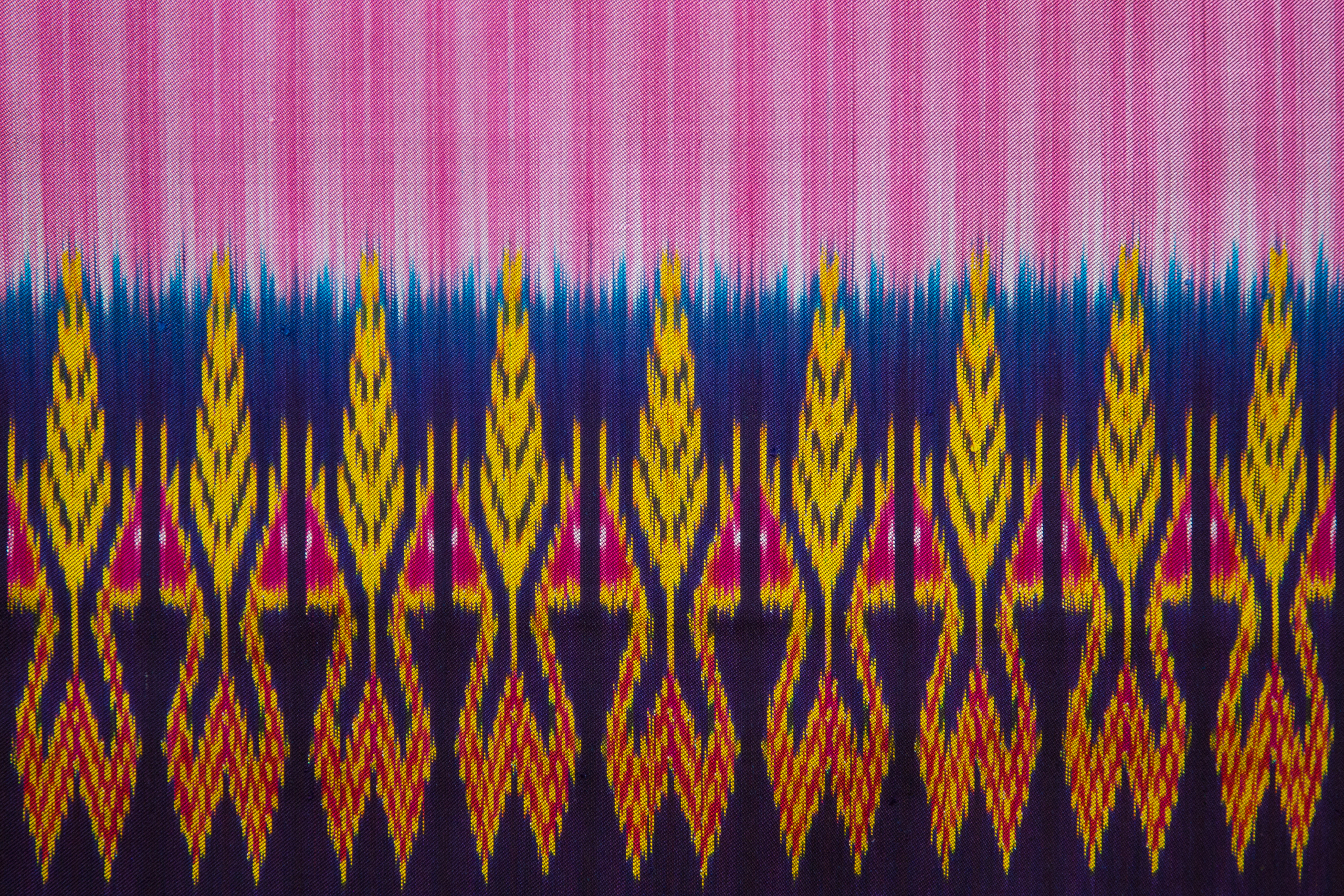

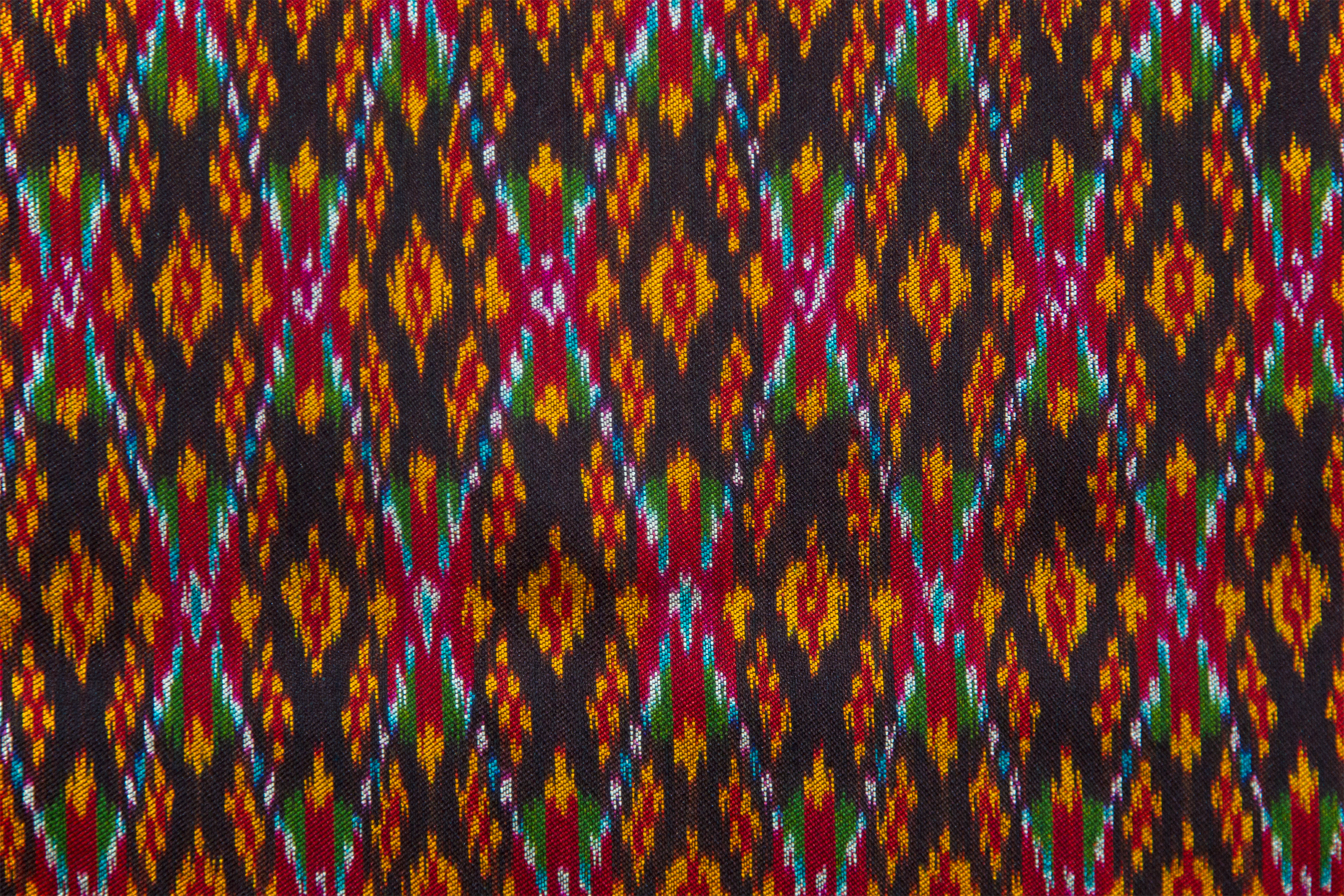

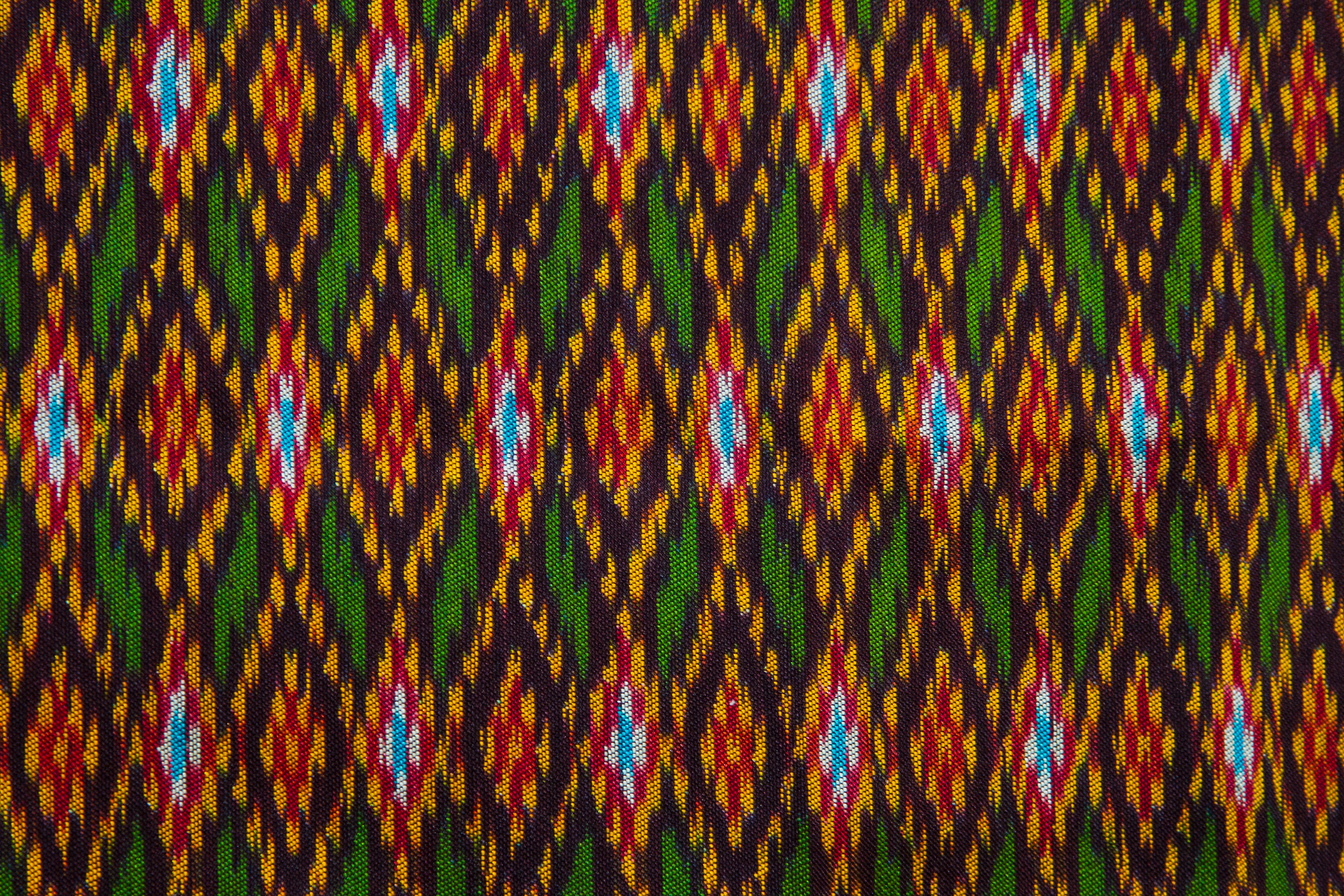

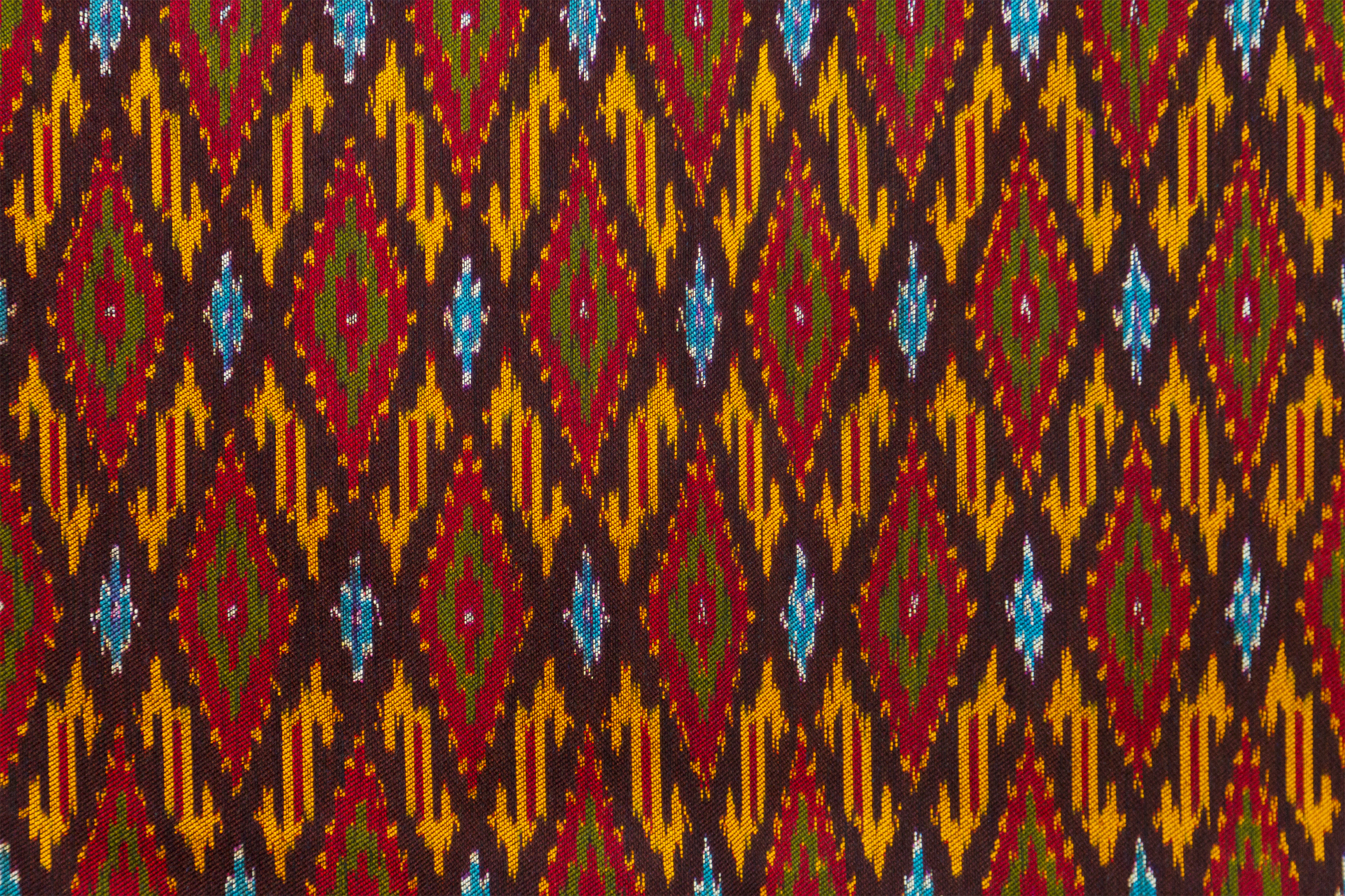

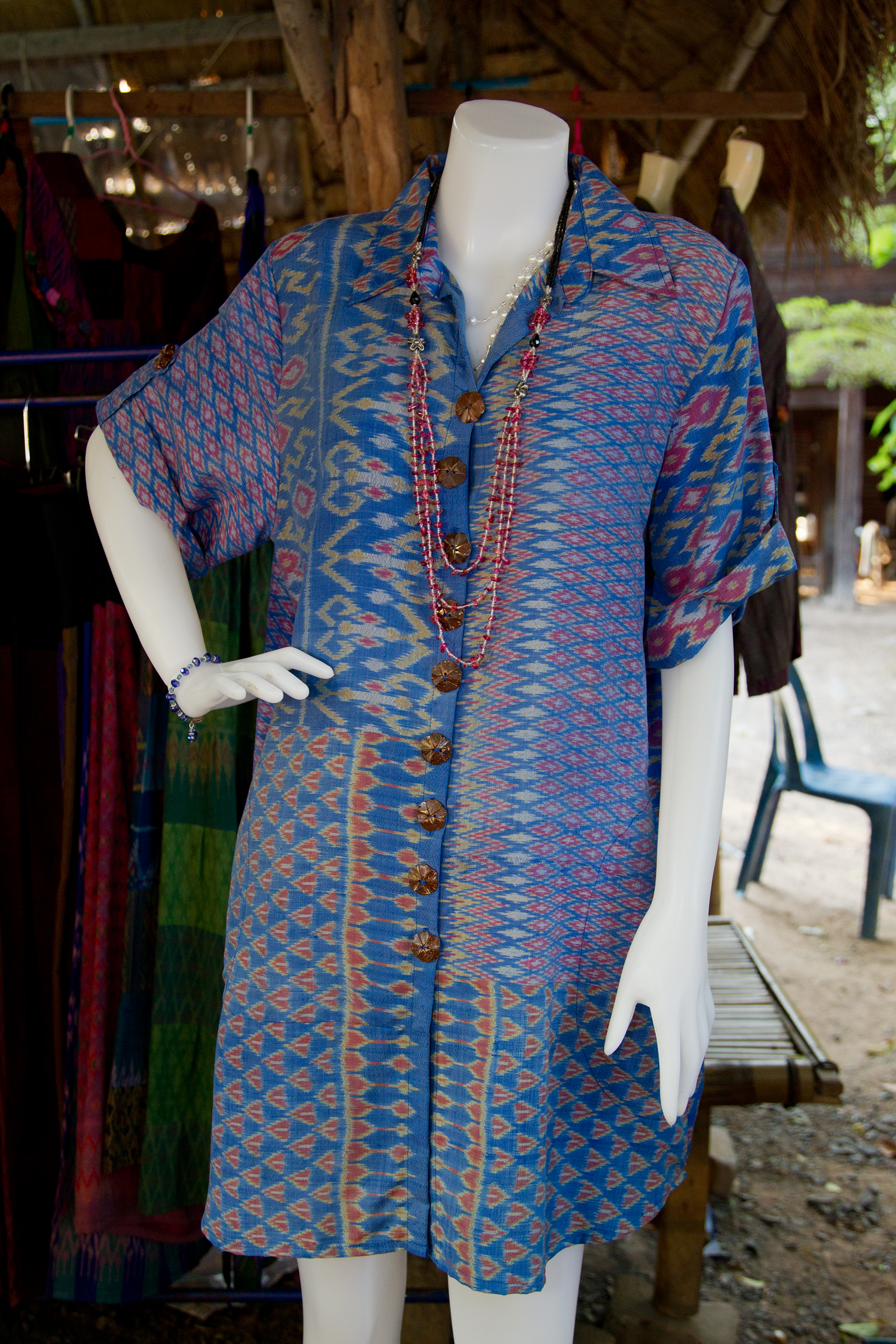

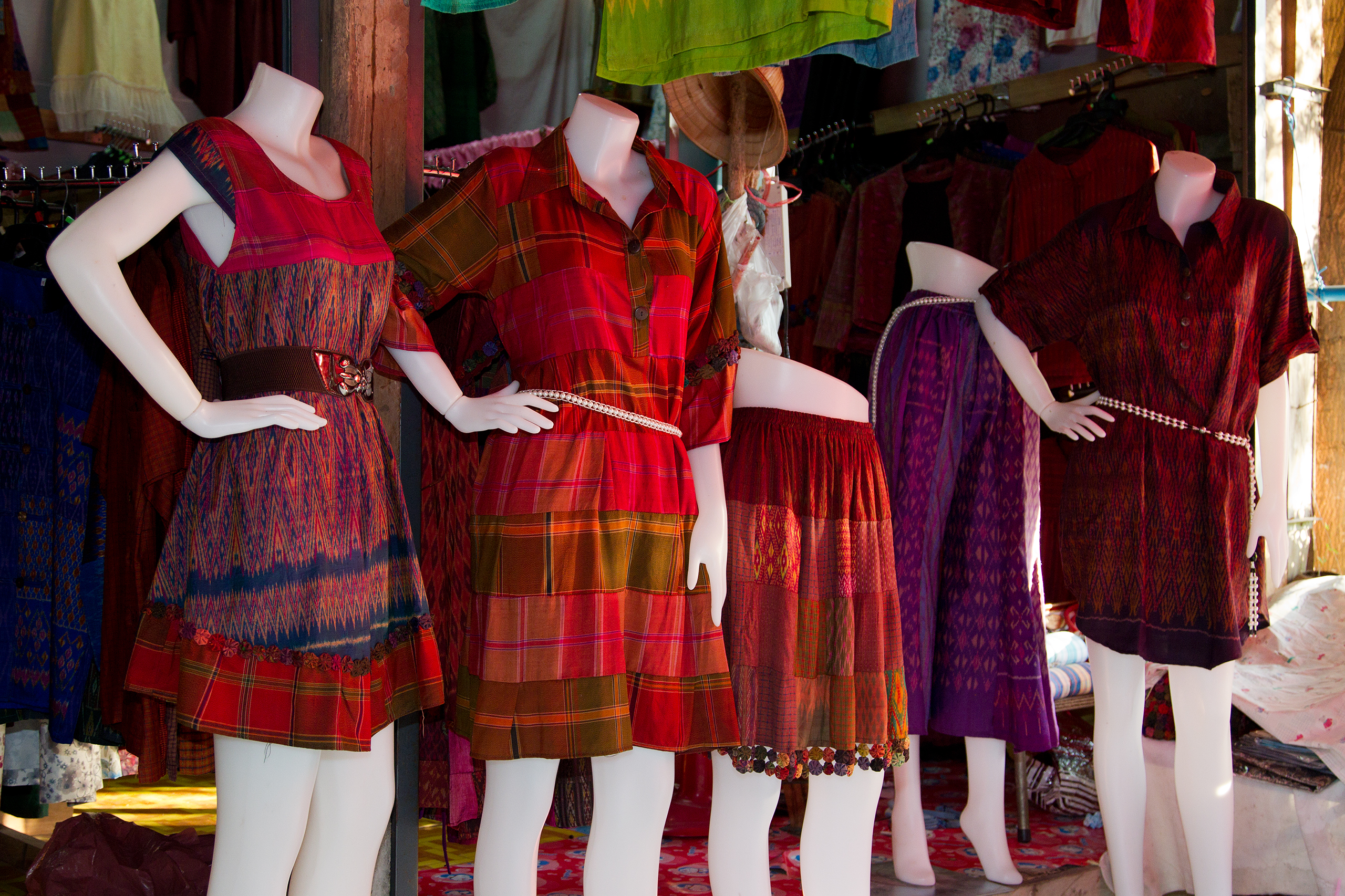

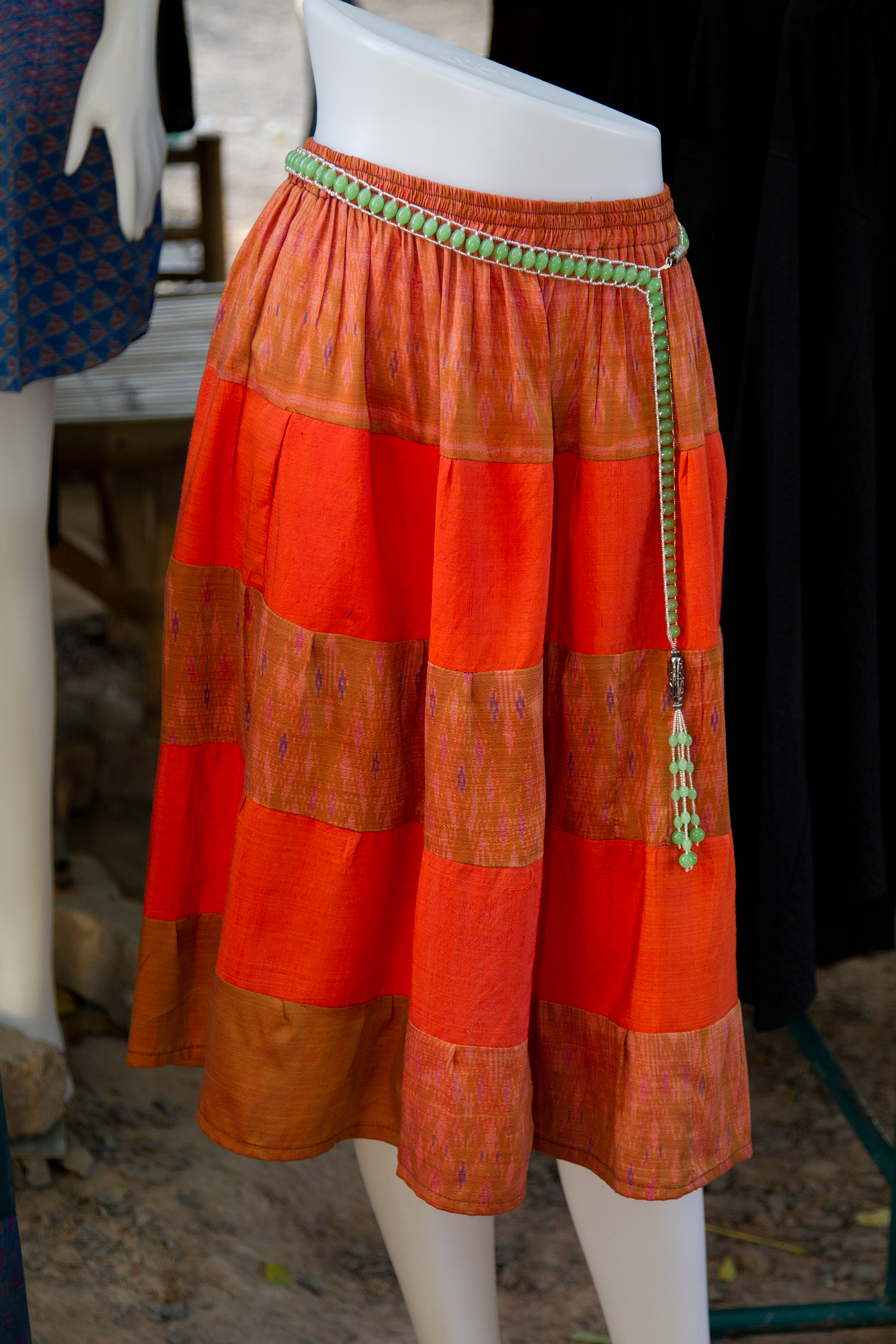

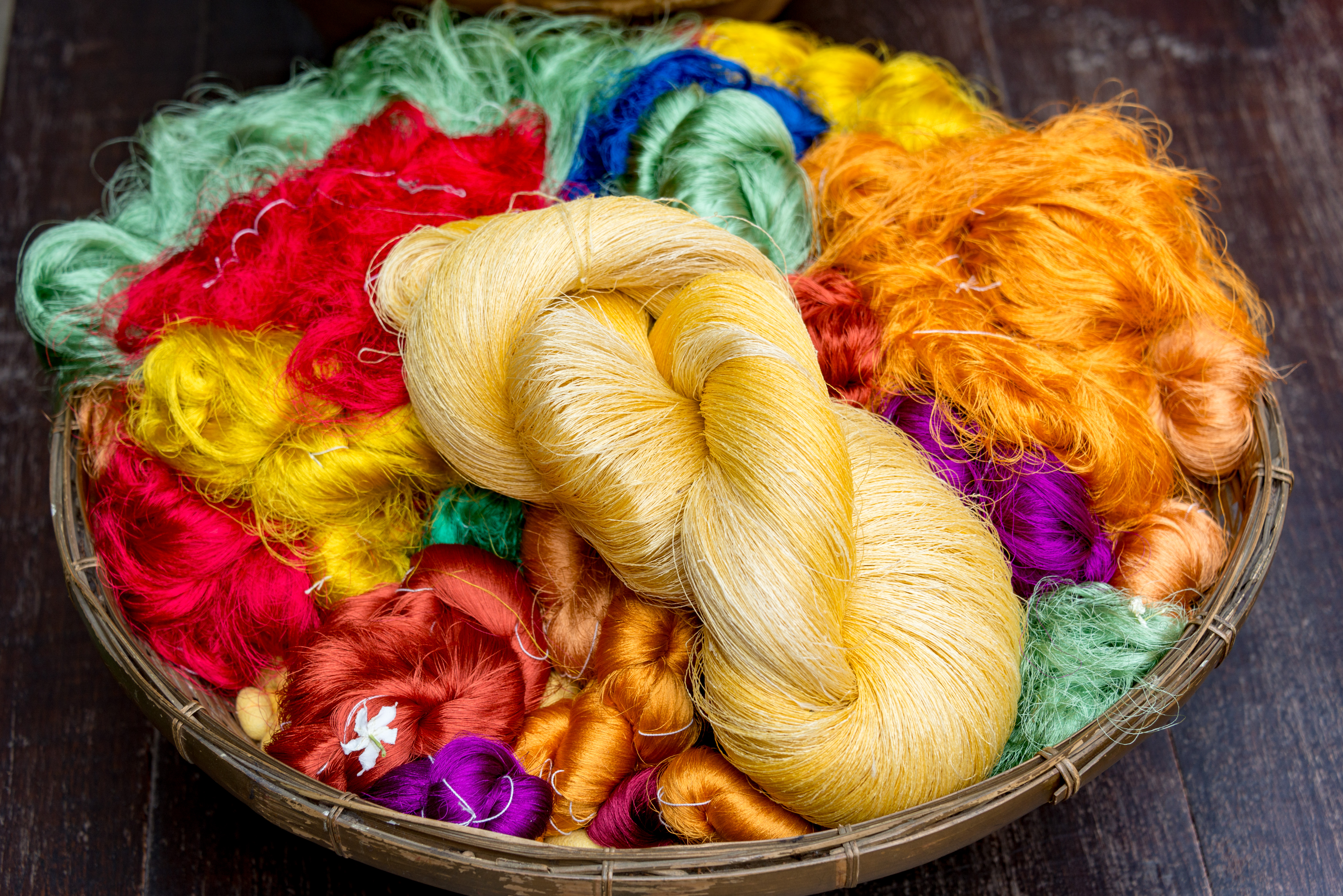
