= Esme Baptista =

Singaporean columnist (1928/29–2022)

Baptista in 1960.

Esme Jovita Baptista (1928 or 1929 – 3 July 2022) was a Singaporean columnist who wrote for The Straits Times. She was also in charge of the Malay Mail advice column 'Dear Ann'.

== Early life and education ==
Baptista was born in India in the late 1920s. She studied with the intention of becoming a secretary at the University of Madras in Chennai. She moved to Singapore with her husband when he was posted there for work.

== Career ==
Though Baptista initially planned on working as a secretary, her husband, a correspondent for The Times, "lured her into writing", believing that she would be "even better" as a newspaperwoman than as a secretary. She was hired as a columnist at The Straits Times by April 1955. At The Straits Times, Baptista primarily wrote on fashion, penning features on the "latest" trends and interviewing locals involved with the fashion industry, such as dressmaker J. Roberts and models Violet Neo and Kisane Davis. She was given her own column for women, titled Esme Baptista presents a page of news for women. According to Eldrick Cheong, she often "infused her own take" in her articles, "advising women not to blindly follow them but rather adopt them in accordance with their own physique." Cheong argued that her "responsibility in writing and penning articles could be extended to being information carriers, particularly for women who lacked access to information given their dominant roles as caregivers in the 1950s through the 1970s."

In the late 1950s, the Malay Mail merged with The Straits Times and became its afternoon sister publication. It was soon decided that the Malay Mail would run an advice column called "Dear Ann" and Baptista, who was then the only married woman on the staff, was put in charge of it. By May 1965, she would receive around 50 letters a week, 12 to 14 of which would be answered in the column. In June 1965, Baptista attended the Asian-American Women Journalists' Conference in Honolulu, which was organised by the United States State Department. She was by then the women's editor of The Straits Times. After the conference, she and eight other Asian journalists went on the "Experiment in International Living" tour of the country. Baptista and the rest of the journalists remained at the final stop of the tour, Washington D.C., for a week as guests of the State Department's Bureau of Educational and Cultural Affairs programme for "Leaders and Specialists".

Baptista's column in The Straits Times ended in the 1970s. Cheong wrote that this "possibly meant that the personal voices of reporters like Baptista and Yong had to be curtailed in order to provide a more homogenous front for newspaper companies." By May 1977, she had instead become the editor of The Outlook, the official newsletter of Singapore Airlines.

== Personal life and death ==
Baptista married an Indian Portuguese journalist who was the Singaporean correspondent of The Times, with whom she had three children. She died in Geelong, Australia on 3 July 2022.
