= Jim Thompson (designer) =

American fashion designer (1906–1974)

- Born: James Harrison Wilson Thompson; March 21, 1906; Greenville, Delaware, U.S.
- Disappeared: March 26, 1967 (aged 61); Cameron Highlands, Pahang, Malaysia
- Status: Declared dead in absentia by a Thai court in 1974
- Education: Princeton University; University of Pennsylvania
- Occupation: Co-founder of the Thai Silk Company Limited
- Known for: being a spy during the Second World War.; reviving the Thai silk industry in the 1950s/1960s.; being a major collector of Southeast Asian art.; constructing the Jim Thompson House in Bangkok, Thailand.; "mysteriously" disappearing from the Cameron Highlands without a trace.

James Harrison Wilson Thompson (March 21, 1906 – disappeared March 26, 1967; declared dead 1974) was an American businessman who helped revitalize the Thai silk industry in the 1950s and 1960s. At the time of his disappearance he was one of the most famous Americans living in Asia. Time magazine claimed he "almost singlehanded(ly) saved Thailand's vital silk industry from extinction".

Investigation in 2023 by Thai authorities found that Thompson had smuggled a large number of antiquities from Thailand and sold them in the United States and the United Kingdom and Thompson also had a relationship with smuggler Douglas Latchford. The objects smuggled by Thompson include those removed from the Si Thep Historical Park during 1960s.

== Early life ==
Jim Thompson was born in Greenville, Delaware, in 1906. He was the youngest of the five children of Henry Thompson, a wealthy textile manufacturer, and his wife Mary Wilson Thompson, the daughter of James Harrison Wilson (1837–1925), a Union general during the American Civil War.

Thompson spent his early years of education at St. Paul's School in Concord, New Hampshire. He graduated from Princeton University in 1928, and represented the United States in the 6-Metre Sailing event at the 1928 Summer Olympics in Amsterdam, the Netherlands. Post-graduate studies followed at the University of Pennsylvania's School of Architecture, but he did not complete his degree at this institution due to his weakness in calculus.

From 1931 to 1940, he practiced in New York City with Holden, McLaughlin & Associates, designing homes for the East Coast rich. During this period, he led an active social life and sat on the board of the Ballet Russe de Monte Carlo.

In 1941, he quit his job and enlisted with the Delaware National Guard. Before the outbreak of the Second World War, he was transferred to a military outpost in Fort Monroe, Virginia. While he was there, he got to know Second Lieutenant Edwin Fahey Black, a fresh graduate from the US Military Academy, West Point. It was Black who encouraged him to join the Office of Strategic Services (OSS), the forerunner of the Central Intelligence Agency.

== World War II activities ==
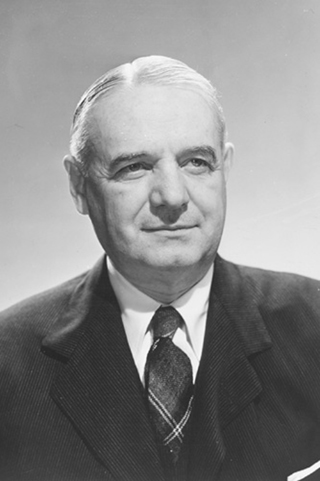
U.S. major general William J. Donovan

At the height of the Second World War, Thompson was recruited by Major General William Joseph Donovan (1883–1959) to serve as an operative in the OSS.

His first assignment was with the French Resistance in North Africa. He was then sent to Europe. After Victory in Europe Day (May 7–8, 1945), he was transferred to Ceylon (now Sri Lanka) to work with the pro-Allied Free Thai Movement (Seri Thai). Their mission was to help liberate Thailand from the occupying Japanese Army. The group had the support of Pridi Panomyong, the regent to King Ananda Mahidol of Thailand, and Seni Pramoj, the Thai ambassador to the United States.

In August 1945, Thompson was about to be sent into Thailand, when the surrender of Japan officially ended World War II. He arrived in Thailand shortly after Victory over Japan Day and organized the Bangkok OSS office. While there he got to know Constance (Connie) Mangskau, an Allied Services translator, who later became one of his closest friends.

In the spring of 1946, Thompson went to work as a military attaché at the United States legation for his former Princeton classmate Charles Woodruff Yost, the US Minister to Thailand. It was the start of Thompson's eleven-year affair with Yost's wife, Irena. In 1950, she had a child, but neither Thompson nor Yost could establish paternity prior to DNA testing.

Thompson used his contacts with the Free Thai and Free Laos (Lao Issara) groups to gather information and defuse conflicts on Thailand's borders. Working with him in the legation was Kenneth Landon, an American missionary whose wife, Margaret Landon, was the author of Anna and the King of Siam, which was the inspiration for the 1946 film of the same name, and the 1956 film The King and I.

== Return to private industry ==
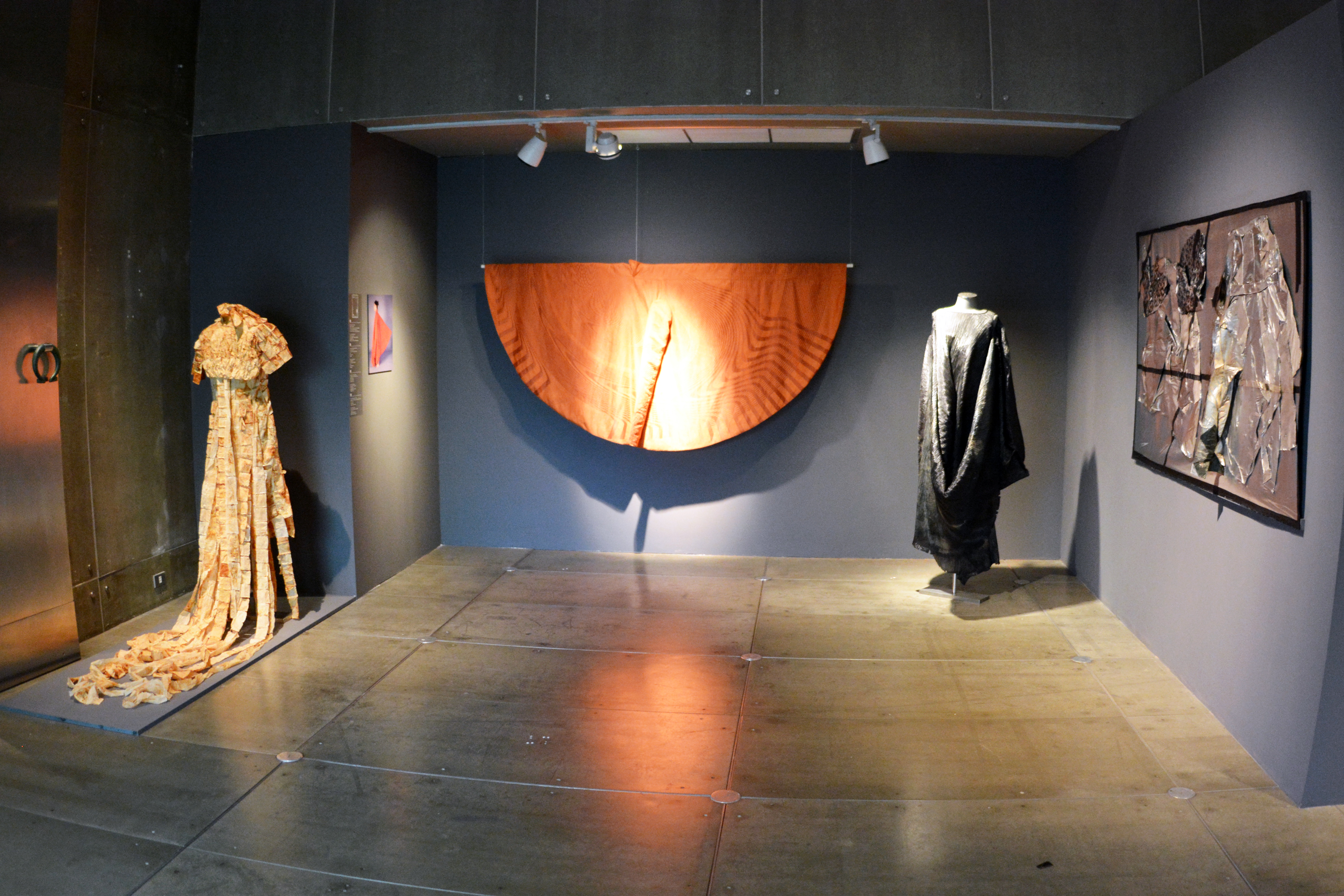
Thompson's private collection of silk garments which were used for the stage musical The King and I.

In late 1946, Thompson headed for home to seek his discharge from the army. After his divorce from Patricia Thraves (1920–1969), he returned to Thailand to join a group of investors to buy the Oriental Hotel in Bangkok. While working on its restoration, he had some differences with his associates and this resulted in him giving up his shares in the company. He subsequently switched his focus to silk trade.

In 1948, he partnered with George Barrie to found the Thai Silk Company Limited. It was capitalized at $25,000. They each owned 18% of the shares, and the remaining 64% were sold to Thai and foreign investors.

The firm achieved a coup in 1951 when designer Irene Sharaff made use of Thai silk fabrics for the Rodgers and Hammerstein musical, The King and I. From then on, the company prospered.

Besides inventing the bright jewel tones and dramatic color combinations today associated with Thai silk, Thompson raised thousands of Thailand's poorest people out of poverty. His determination to keep his company cottage-based was significant for the women who made up the bulk of his work force. By allowing them to work at home, they retained their position in the household while becoming breadwinners. It was only after Thompson's disappearance that the Thai Silk Company relocated its weaving operations to Korat, a city which serves as a base of operations for the Royal Thai Army. Although it abandoned home-based weaving in favor of factories in the early 1970s, the Thai Silk Company's facility in Amphoe Pak Thong Chai, Korat, presents itself more as a beautifully landscaped campus than a typical factory.

== Thompson's "House on the Klong" ==
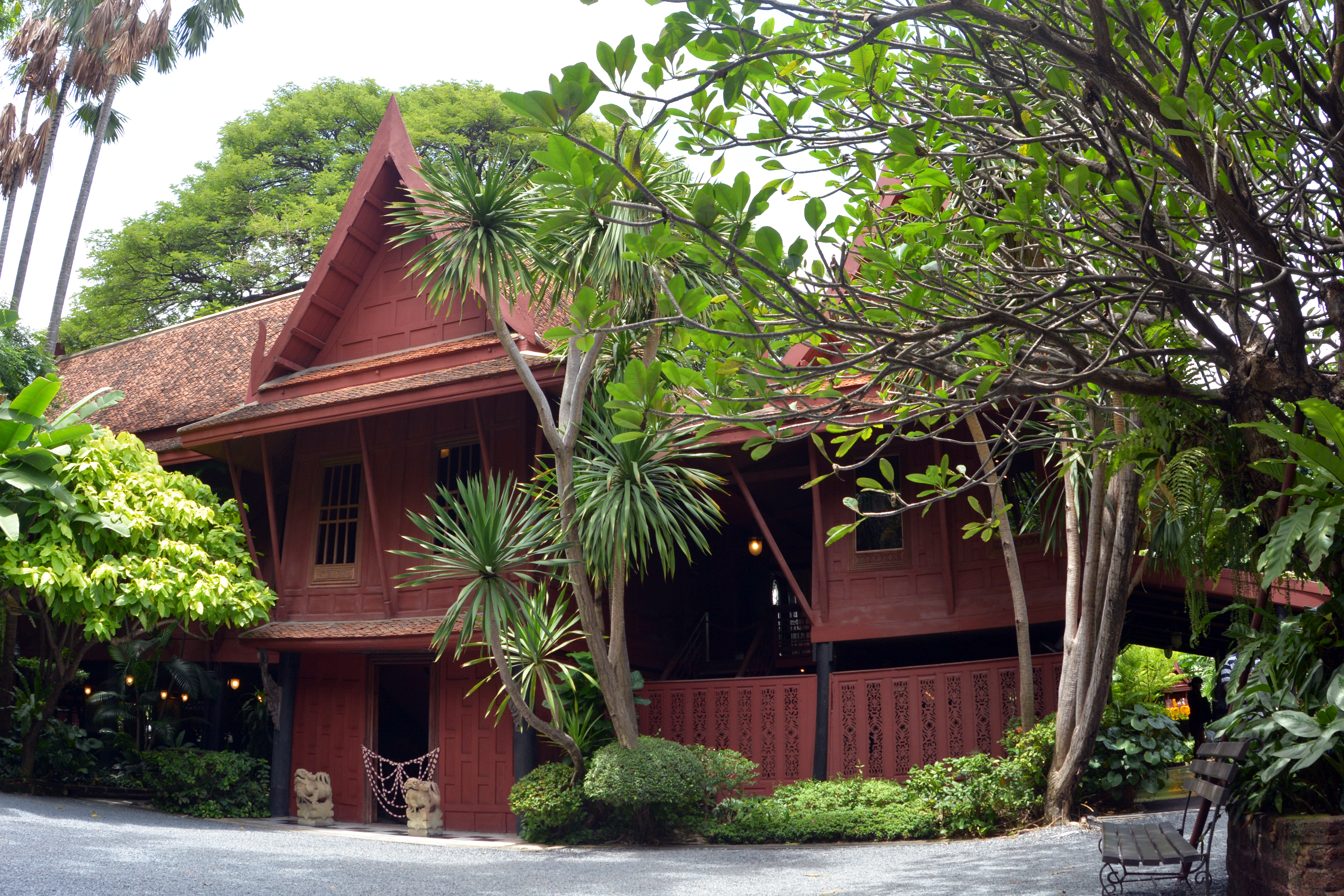
Jim Thompson House: Main building (c. 2013).

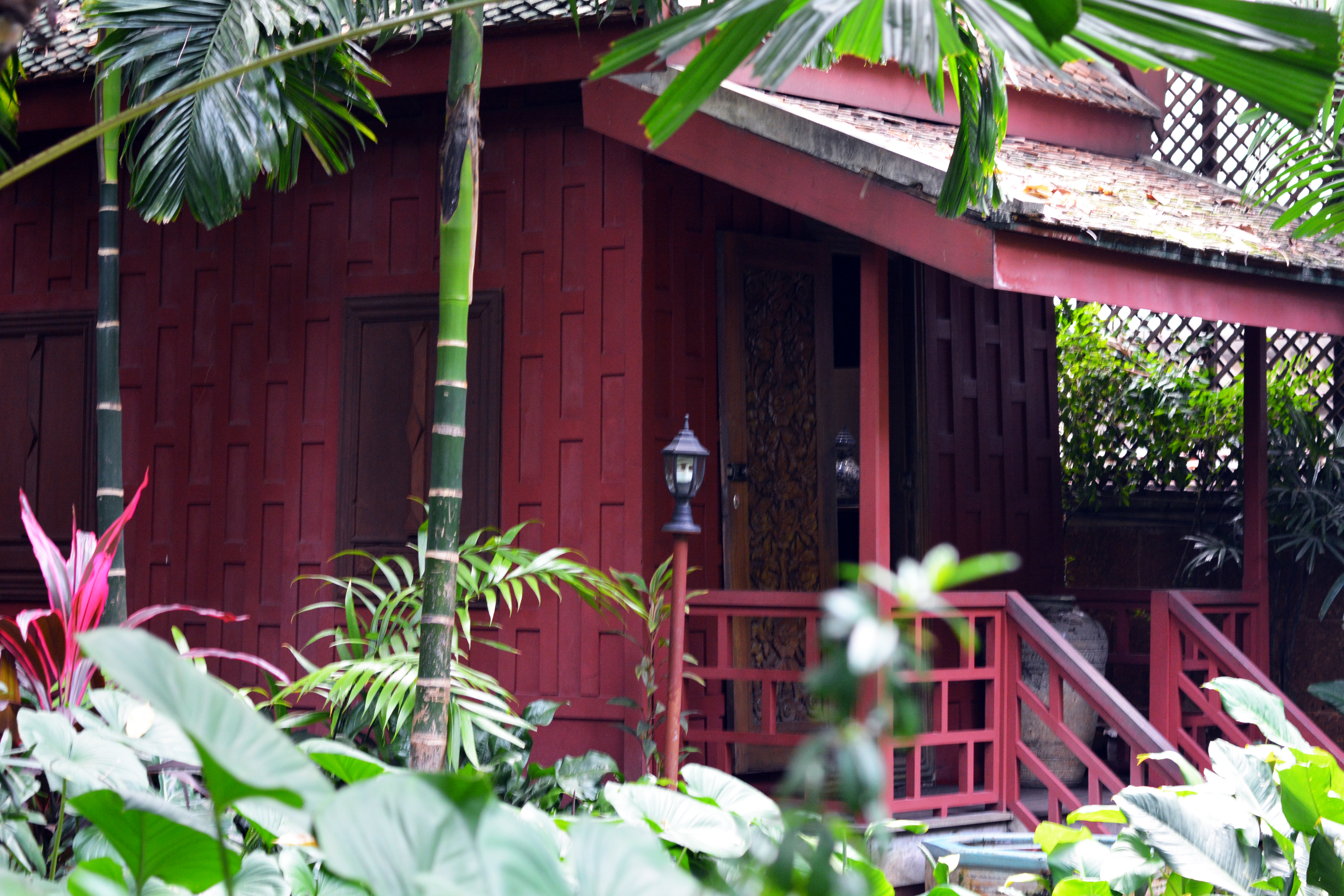
Jim Thompson House: Service building and gift shop.

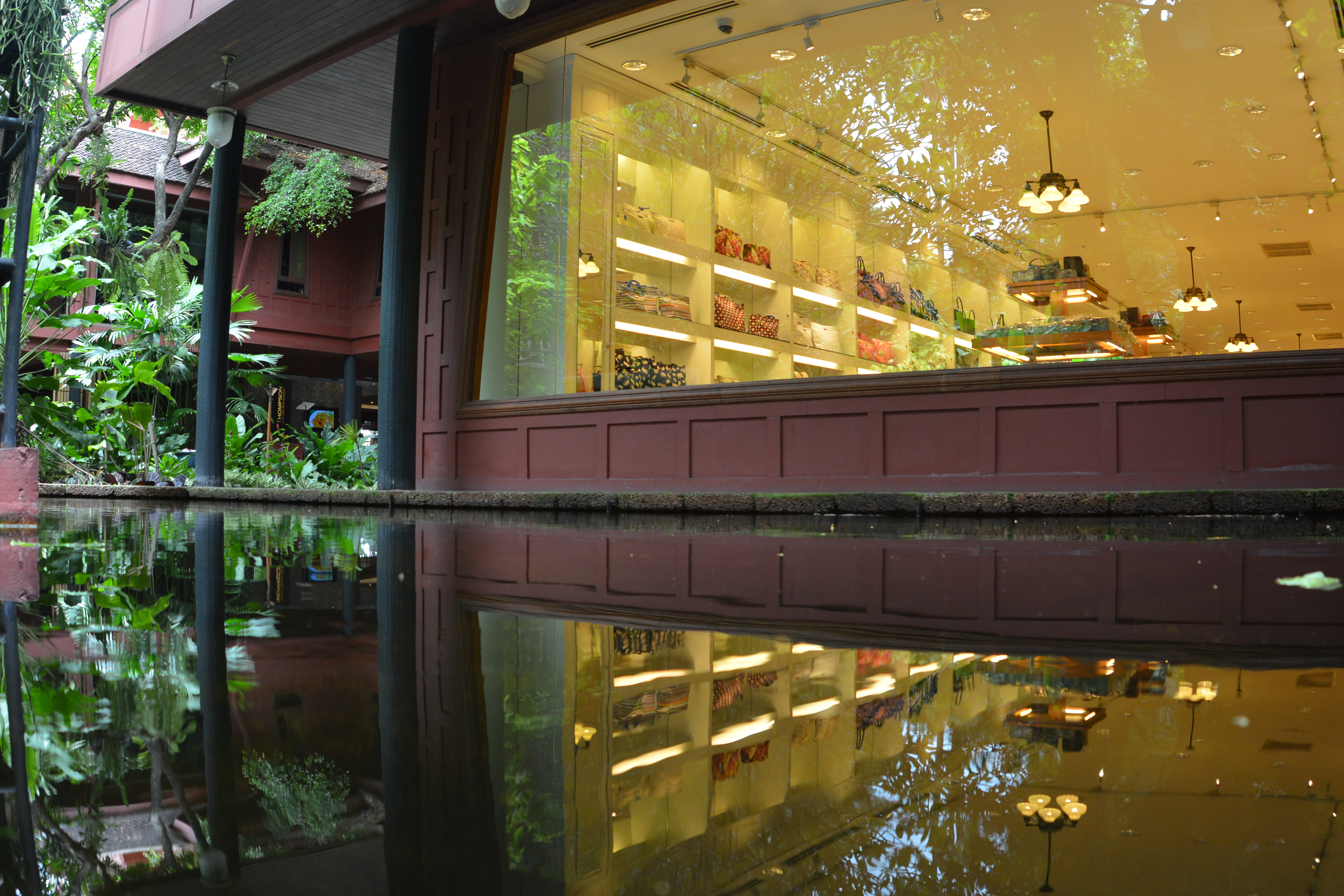
Jim Thompson House: Pond reflection of retail store.

Thompson was unlike any other figure in Southeast Asia. He was an American, an ex-architect, a retired army officer, a one-time spy, a silk merchant and a collector of antiques. Most of Thompson's treasures, if not all, were amassed after he came to Thailand.

In 1958, Thompson began what was to be the pinnacle of his architectural achievement – the construction of a new home to showcase his objets d'art.

Using parts of old up-country houses – some as old as a hundred years – Thompson succeeded in constructing a masterpiece that involved the reassembling of six Thai dwellings on his estate. Most of the units were dismantled and brought over by river from Ayutthaya, but the largest – a weaver's house (now the living room) – came from Bangkrua. On arrival, the woodwork was offloaded and pieced together.

In his quest for authenticity, Thompson saw to it that some of the structures were elevated a full floor above the ground. During the construction stage, he added his own touches to the buildings by positioning, for instance, a central staircase indoors rather than having it outside. Along the way, Thompson also reversed the wall panels of his quarters so that it now faced inside instead of it having an external orientation.

After Thompson had completed its construction, he filled his home with the items he had collected. Decorating his rooms were Chinese blue-and-white Ming pieces, Belgian glass, Cambodian carvings, Victorian-era chandeliers, Benjarong earthenware, Thai stone images, Burmese statues, and a dining table which was once used by King Rama V of Thailand.

Thompson dedicated nearly a year to the meticulous creation of his opulent mansion. Today, the Jim Thompson House is a museum accessible via public or private transportation. Known for its architecture and historical significance, the site is popular with tourists, featuring in the top 5 must-visit places in Bangkok according to TripAdvisor's 2022 rankings.

== Disappearance ==
Thompson disappeared from Malaysia's Cameron Highlands after going for a walk on March 26, 1967. His disappearance from the hill station generated one of the largest land searches in Southeast Asian history and remains one of the most famous mysteries in the region. Over the years, many theories have been advanced to explain his disappearance, but no definitive answer has ever emerged. Thompson was declared dead in absentia by a Thai court in 1974.

== See also ==
- Disappearance of Jim Thompson
- List of people who disappeared mysteriously: 1910–1990
- Missing person
