= Heseltine Collection =

Art collection owned by John Postle Heseltine

The Heseltine Collection was a collection of oil paintings and old-master drawings and watercolours of the English and Continental schools collected by John Postle Heseltine, a British stockbroker and artist.

== History ==
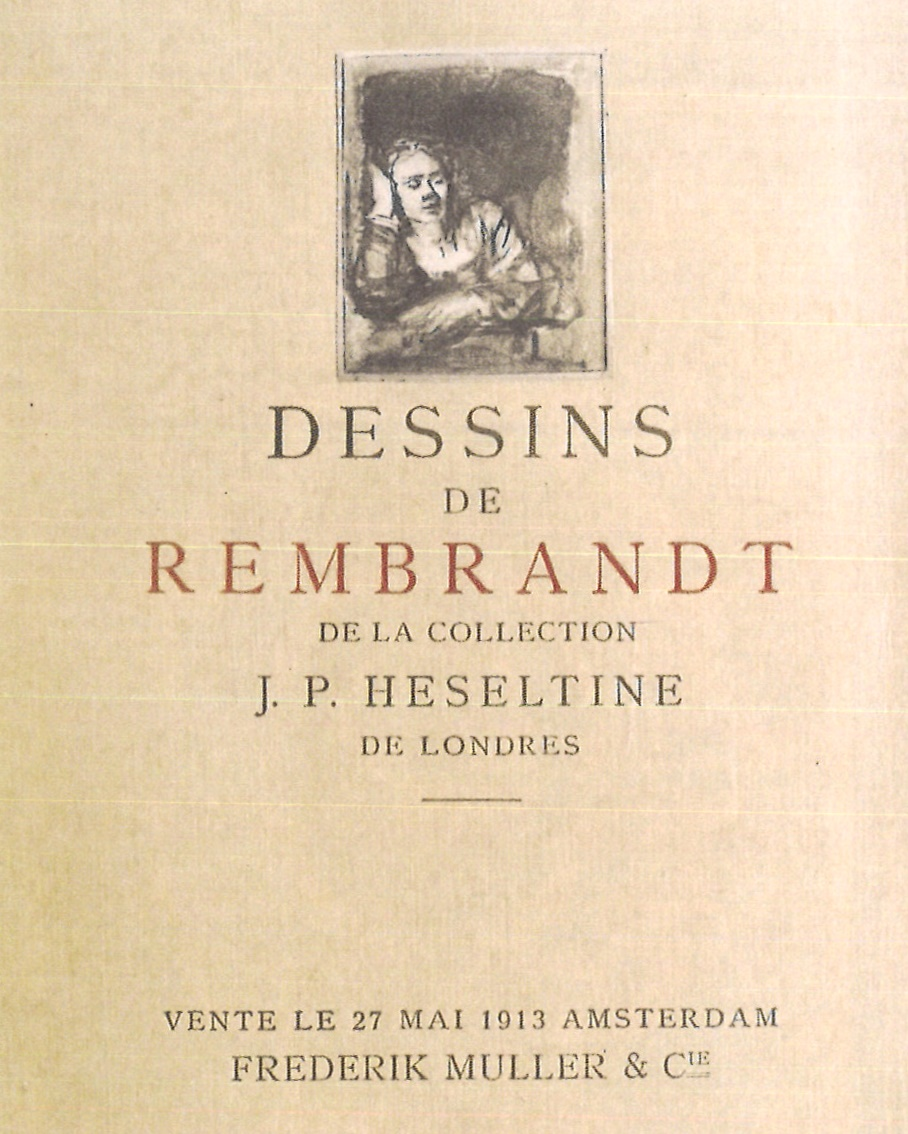
Auction catalogue of the Rembrandt drawings (1913)

From 1893 until his death in 1929, Heseltine was a trustee of the National Gallery and advised on the purchase of paintings, particularly works from the Dutch and Flemish schools. Beginning in 1905 and lasting for the eighteen month period between Sir Edward Poynter's retirement as director and the appointment of Charles Holroyd, he shared responsibility for running the Gallery with George Howard, 9th Earl of Carlisle, a fellow trustee.

During his lifetime, he published 13 privately printed volumes of reproductions of drawings in his collection.

Heseltine collected over 600 old master drawings, including 78 Rembrandts, Rubens, 9 by Raphael (7 of which came from the Constable volume), Michelangelo, Francesco Bartolomeo, 3 portraits by Holbein, 9 by Dürer (including the portrait of Margaret of Hohenzollern), Constable, 32 by Watteau and 18 by Boucher. There were also 17 landscapes and portrait drawings by Thomas Gainsborough. In 1912, after fifty years of collecting, he sold his collection of over 600 old master drawings to the London dealer Colnaghi & Obach for a price near $1,000,000. Thirty-two of his Rembrandt drawings sold the following May at what was then a high average of over $3,750 per drawing, including The Farm (for $12,540), a portrait of Rembrandt in studio attire (for $9,375), View on the Bank of the Amstel (for $9,250), Group of Trees at the Waterside (for $8,335), Woman Asleep (for $6,220), a nude study of a woman (for $5,500), and A Young Girl Asleep (for $5,290).

Further sales of the collection occurred at Frederik Muller & Co. in Amsterdam in May 1913 and at Sotheby's in March and June 1920. The remainder of the collection, including the library, was dispersed posthumously at Sotheby's in April 1933, April 1934, May 1935, June 1935 and July 1935.

== Notable pieces ==
Paintings

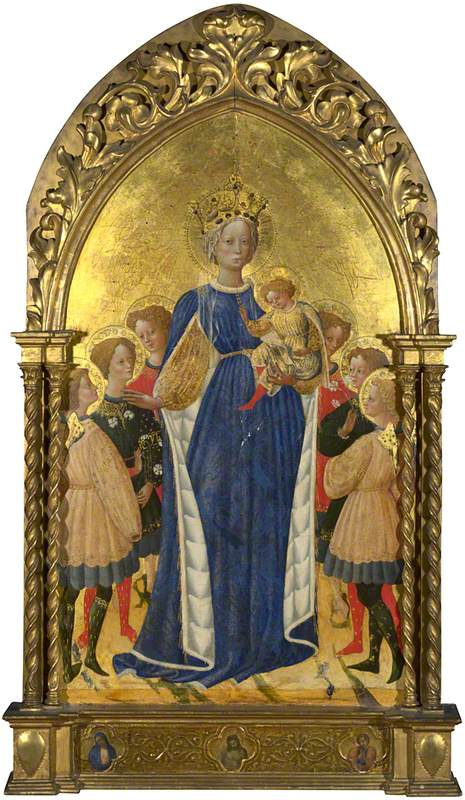
The Virgin and Child with Six Angels and Two Cherubim, by Francesco d'Antonio (c. 1438-1452)

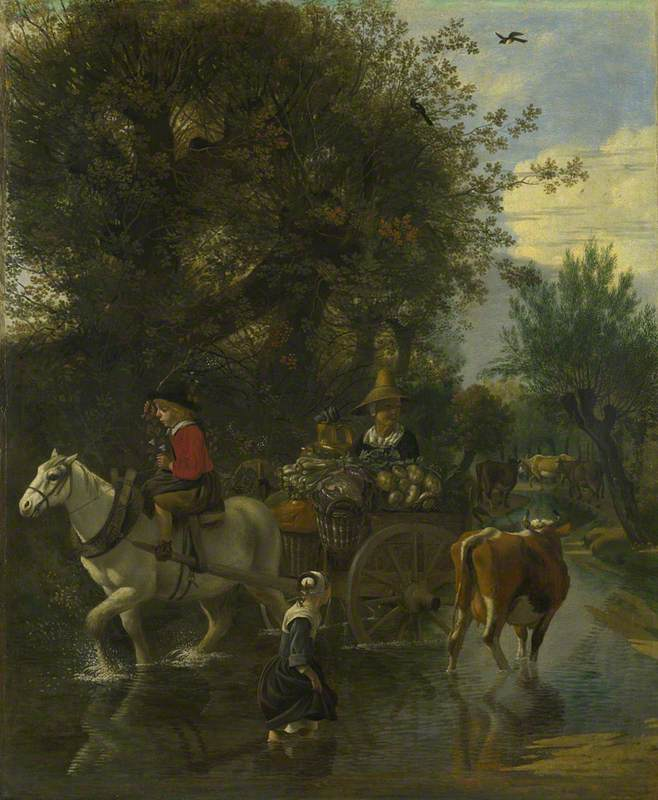
A Cowherd passing a Horse and Cart in a Stream by Jan Siberechts (1658)

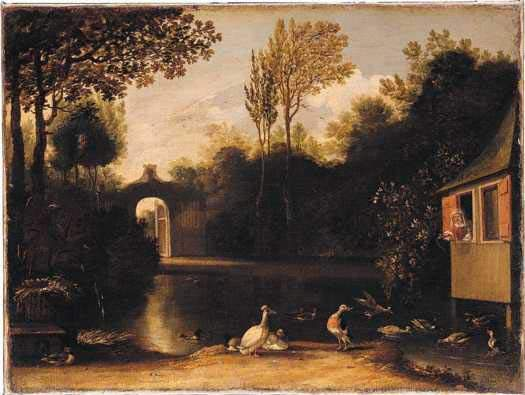
A Garden Scene with Waterfowl by Anthonie van Borssom (c. 1658-1667)

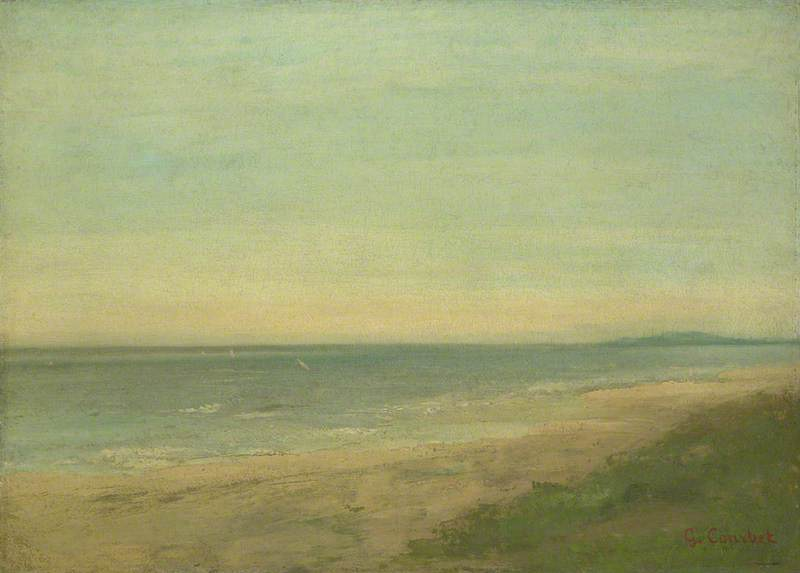
The Sea near Palavas after Gustave Courbet (c. 1850-1900)

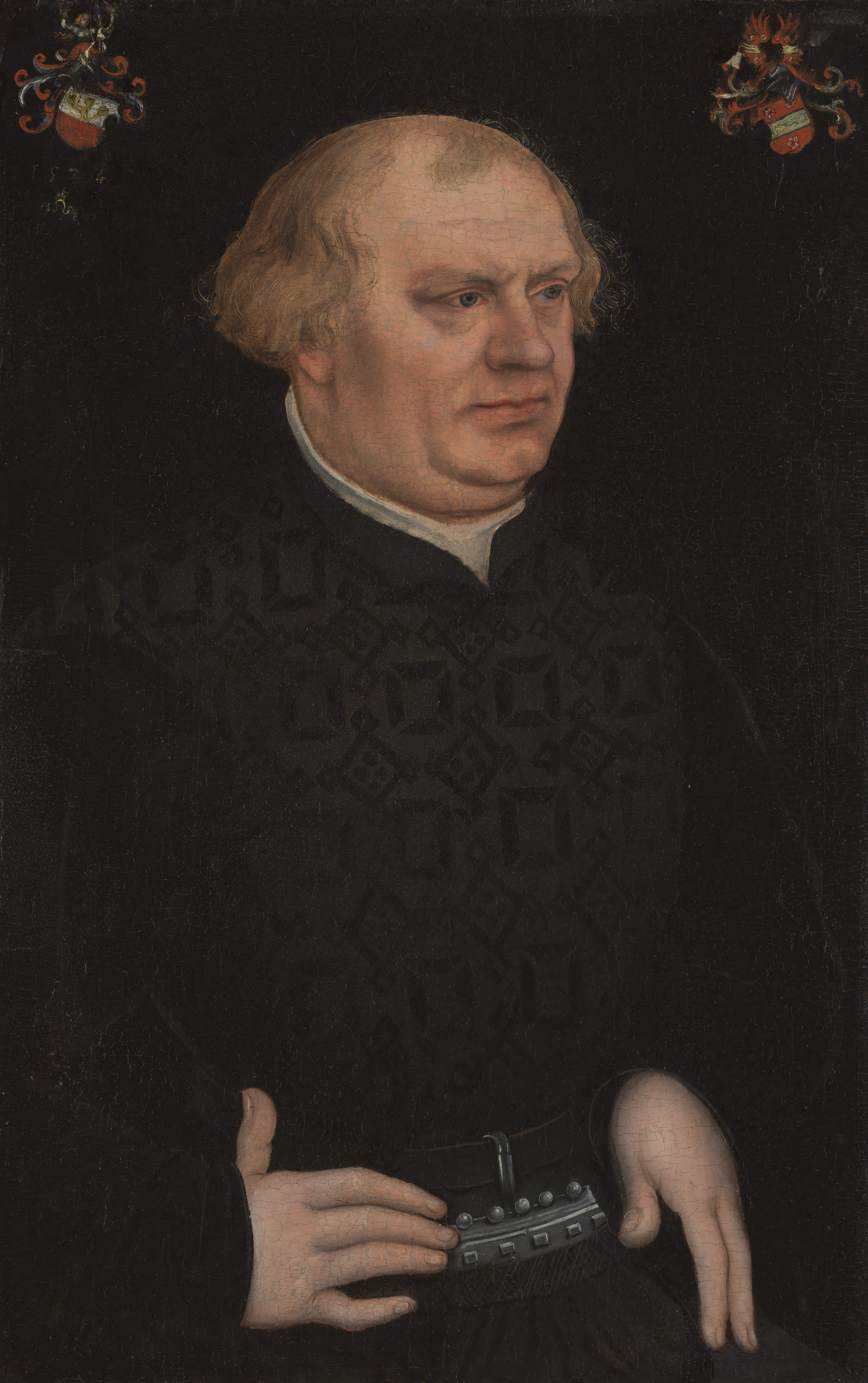
Portrait of Johannes Feige by Lucas Cranach the Elder (c. 1524-1534)

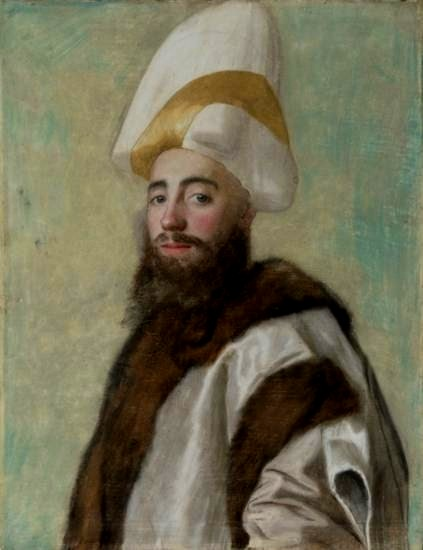
Portrait of a Grand Vizir by Jean-Étienne Liotard (c. 1738-1743)

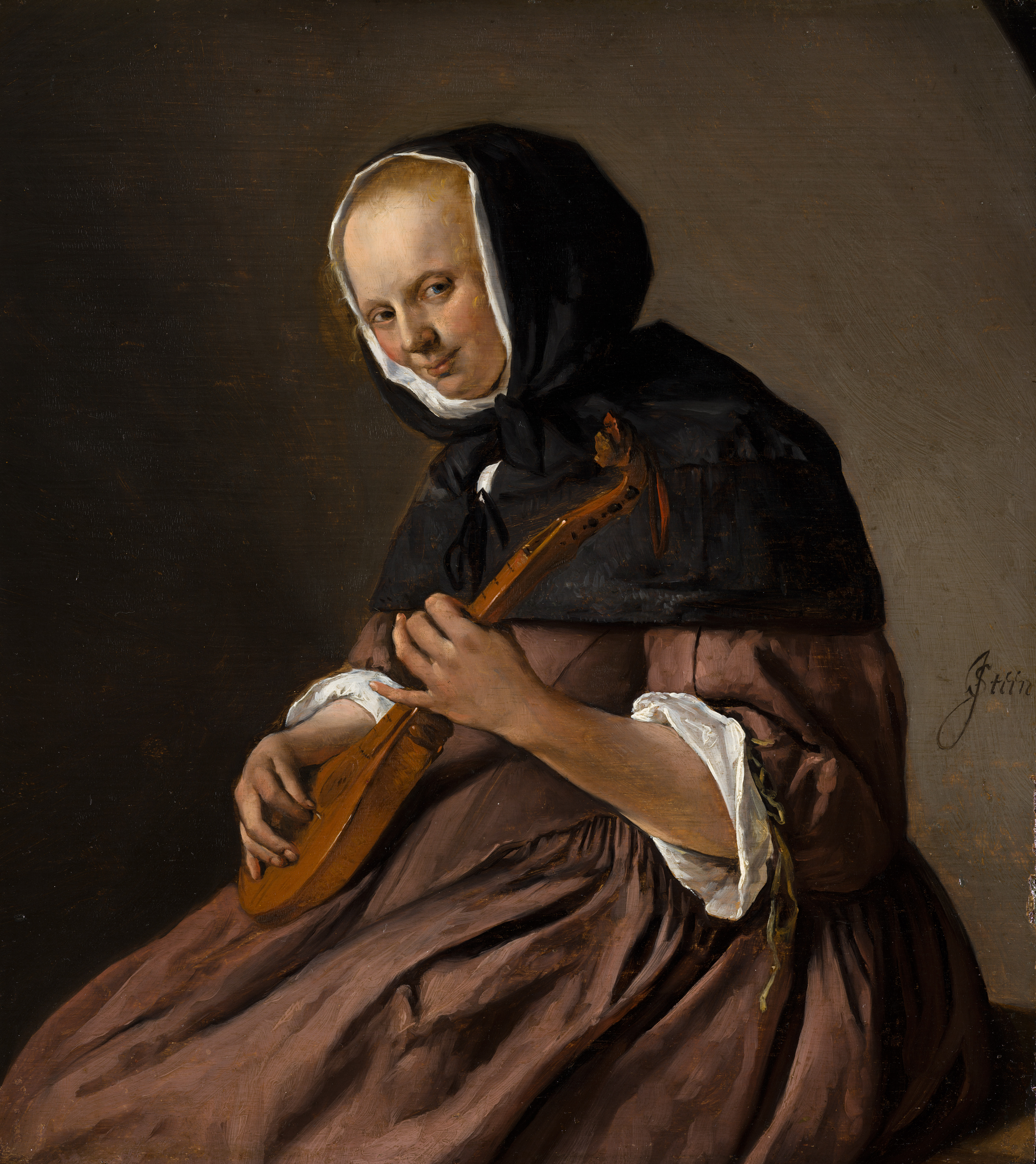
Woman Playing the Cittern by Jan Steen (c. 1662)

Drawings

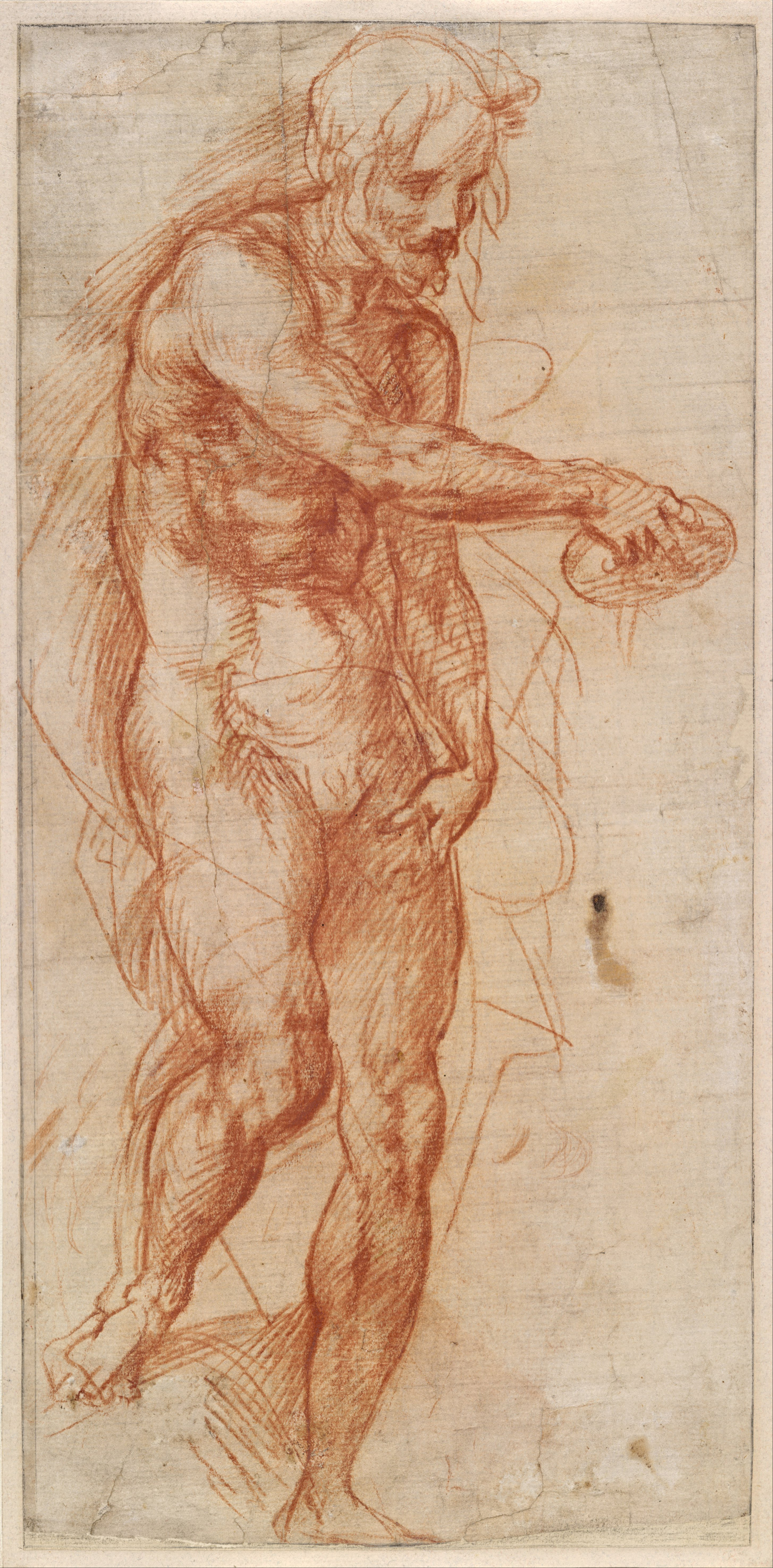
Study for St John the Baptist by Andrea del Sarto (c. 1517)

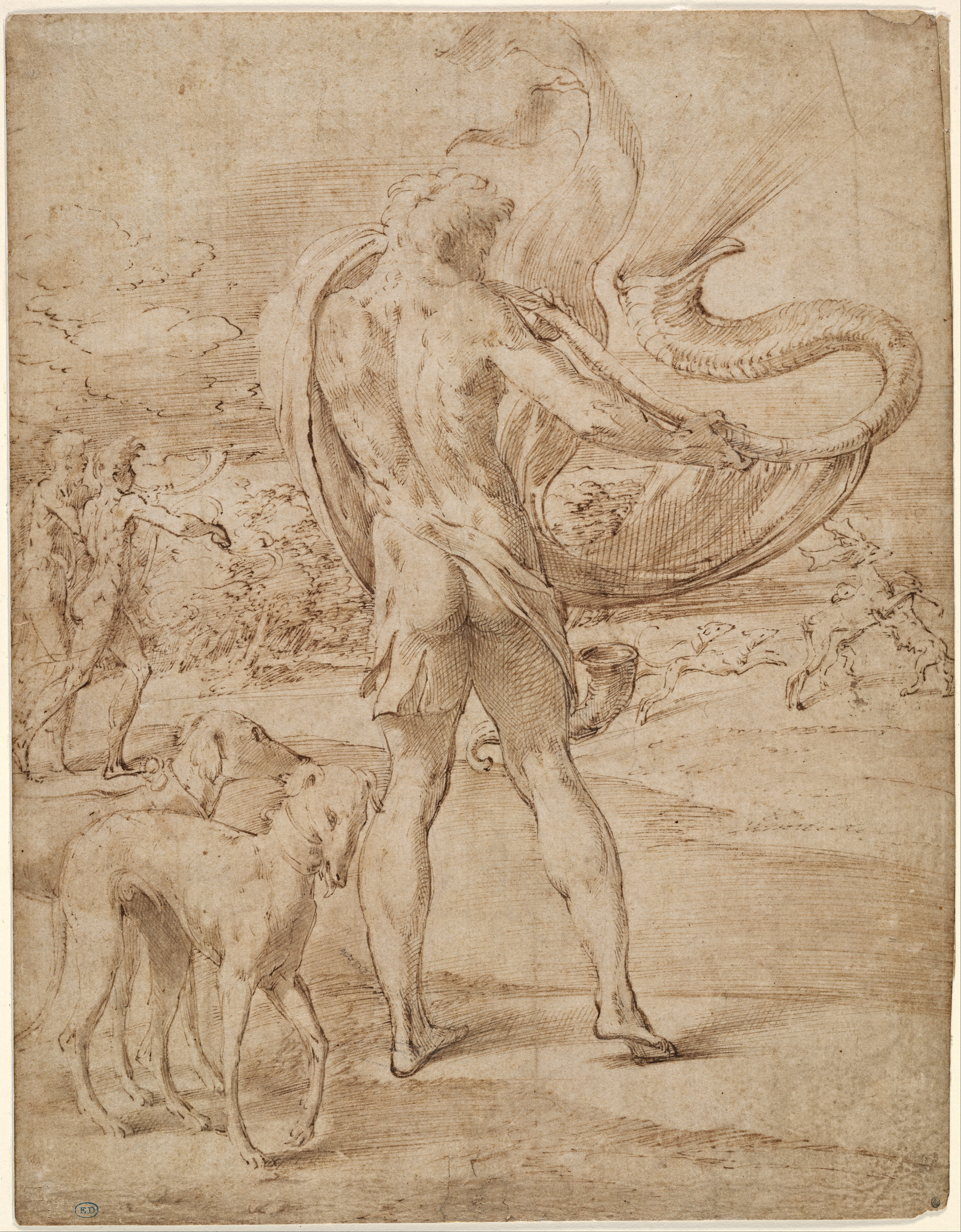
Huntsmen sounding his horn with a staghunt in the distance by Parmigianino (c. 1530-1539)

Bent male nude b Timoteo Viti (c. 1504)

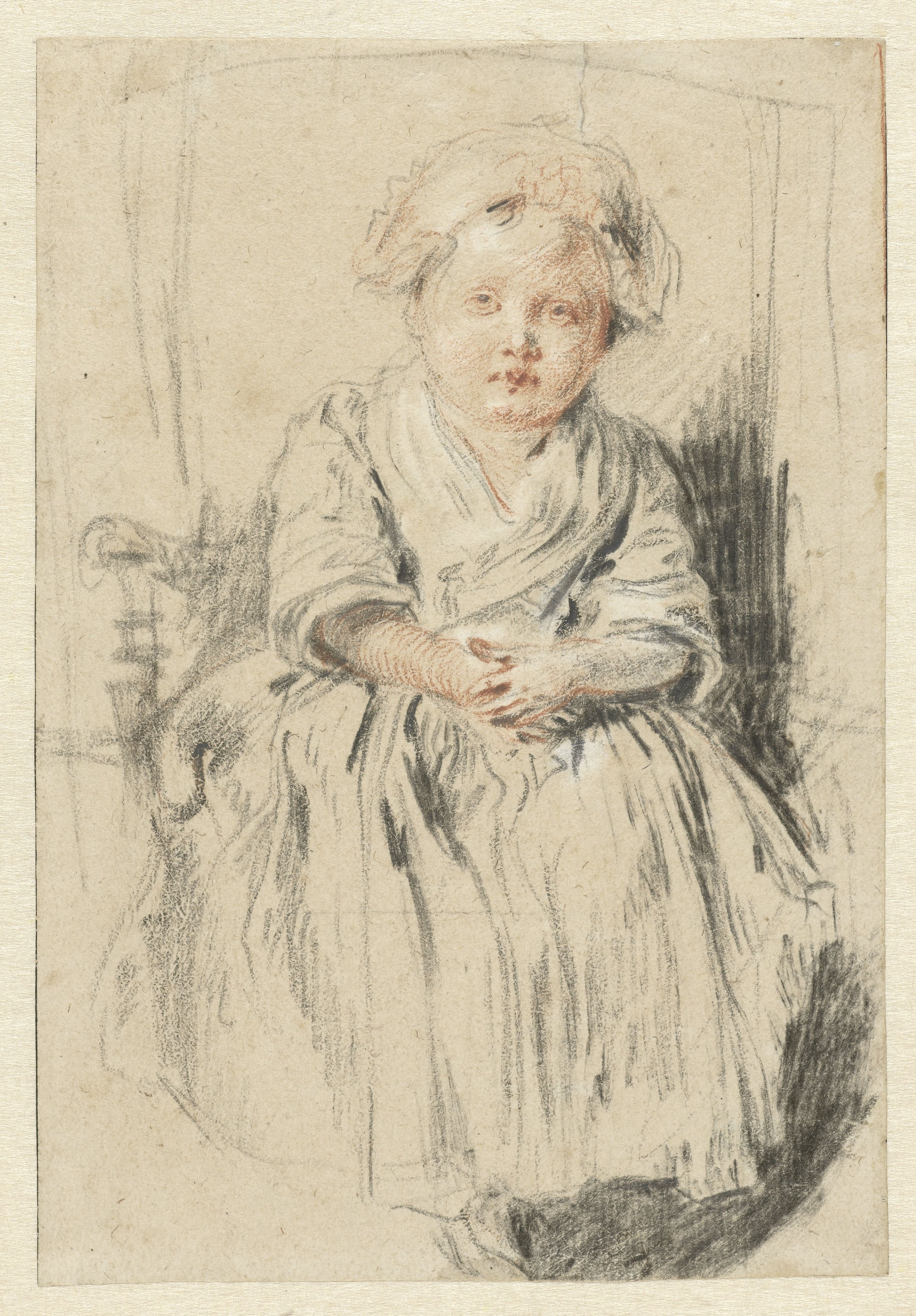
Seated Child in an Armchair, by Antoine Watteau (1705-1721)

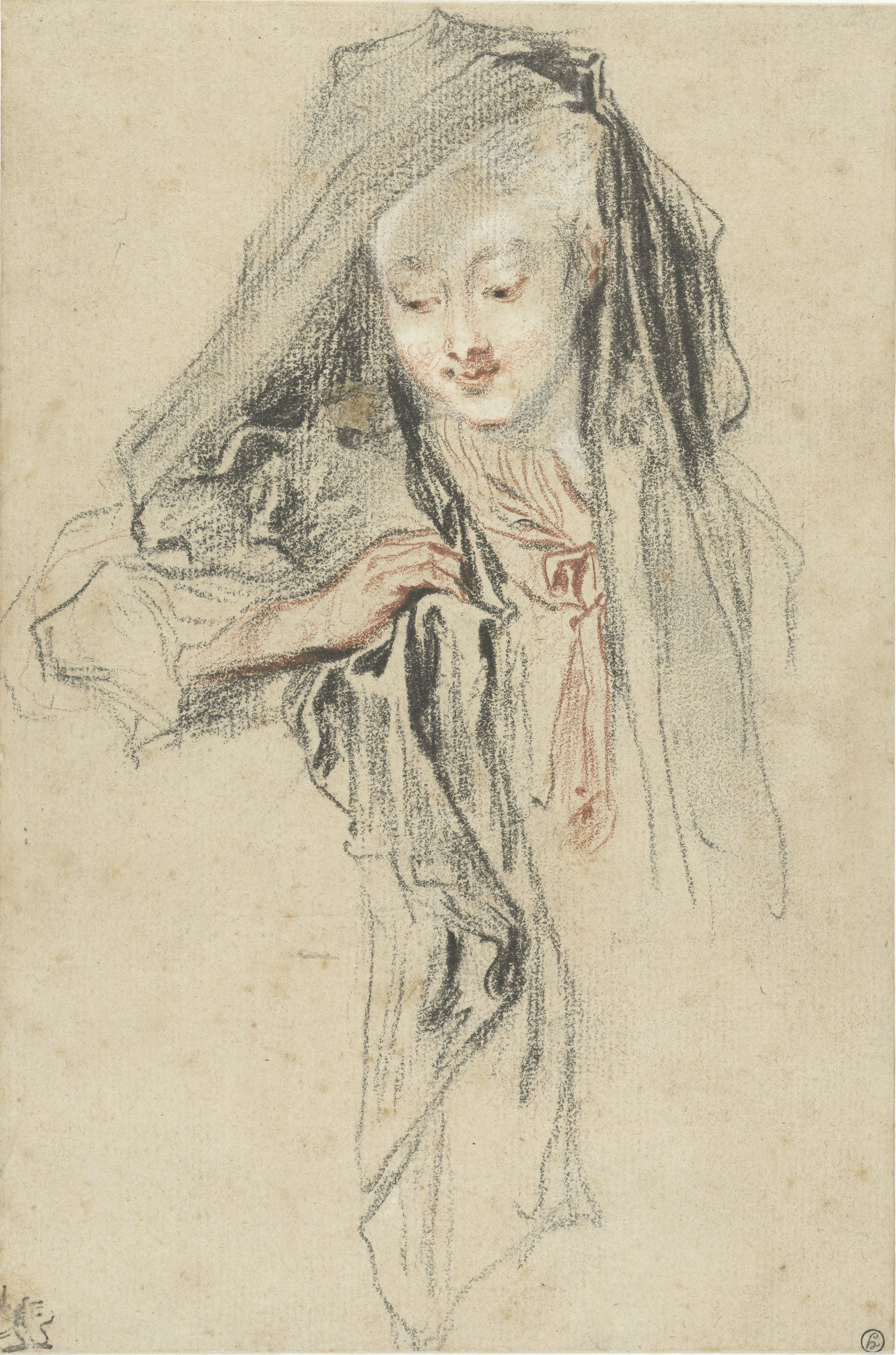
Woman with veil by Antoine Watteau (1715-1720)

Allegory of Charity by Francesco d'Antonio (c. 1505-c. 1508)

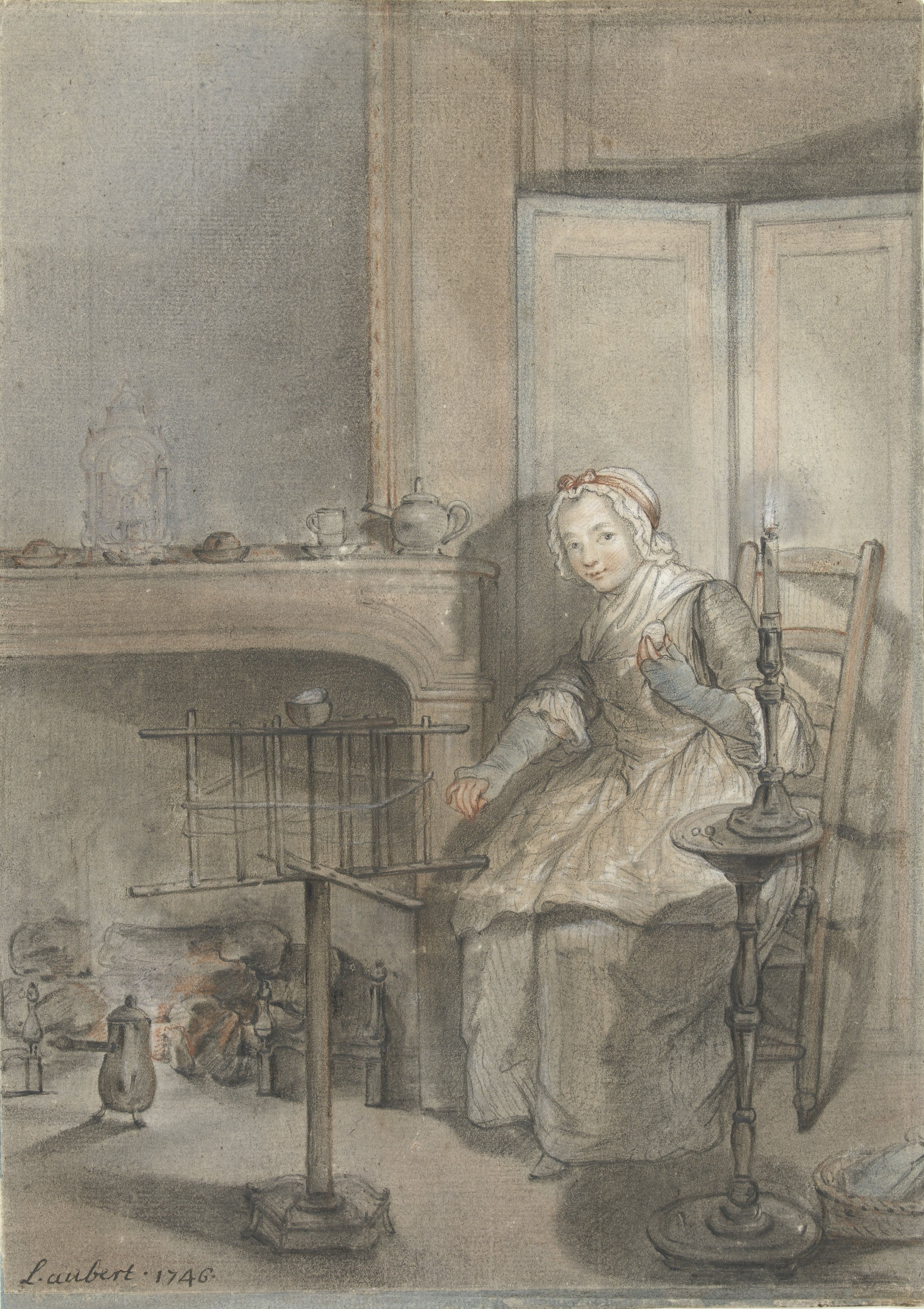
Interior with a cloudy young woman, by Louis Aubert (1746)

Heseltine's own work

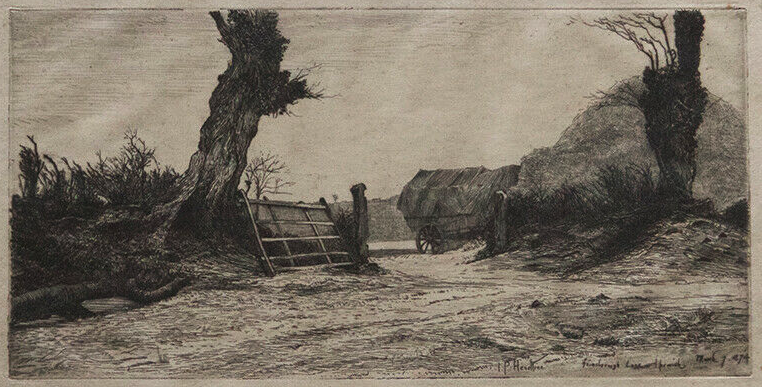
Ipswich (1874)

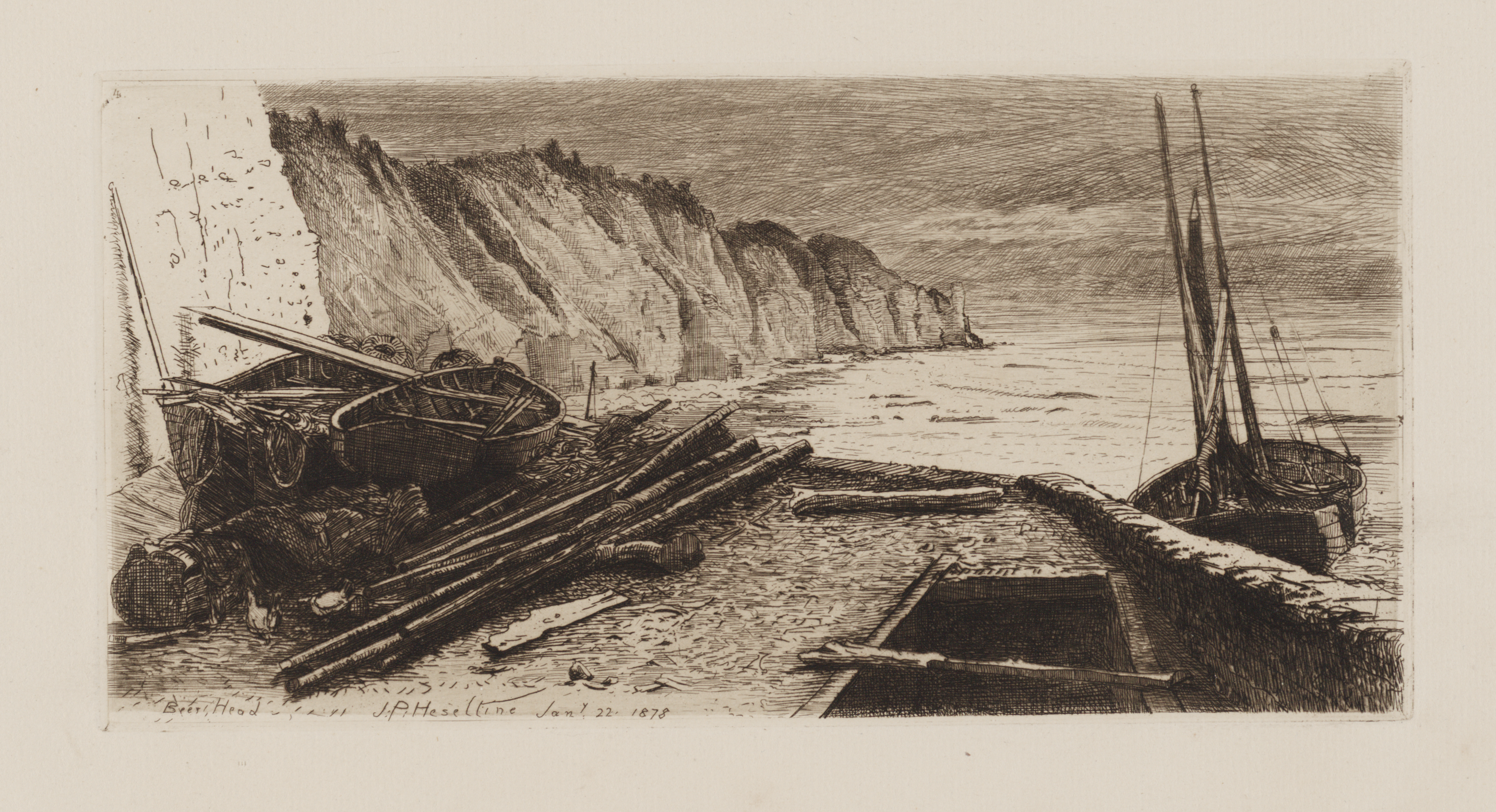
Beer (1878)
