= John Postle Heseltine =

Painter and trustee of the National Gallery, London

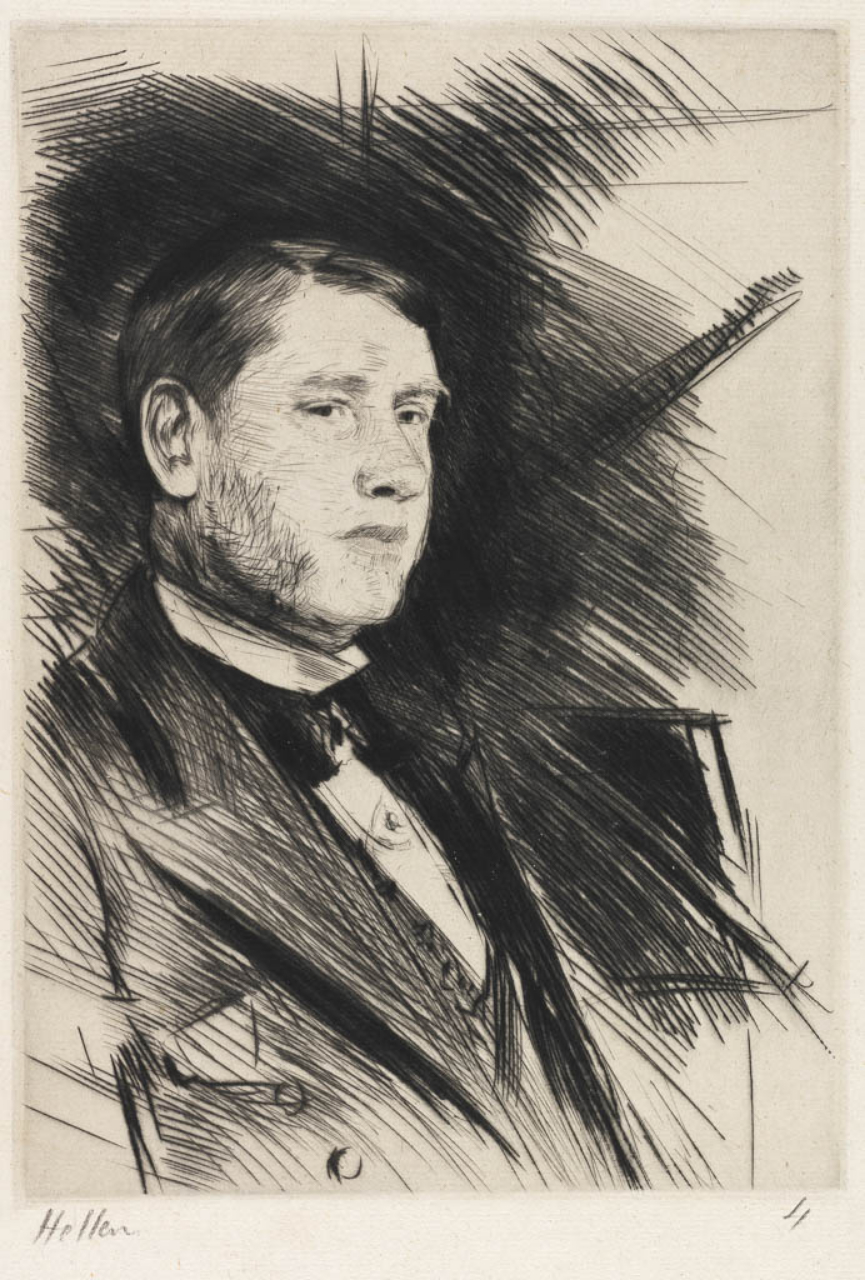
Portrait of John Postle Heseltine, by Paul César Helleu (c. 1894)

John Postle Heseltine (6 January 1843 – 2 March 1929) was a painter and art collector who became a trustee of the National Gallery, London.

== Early life ==
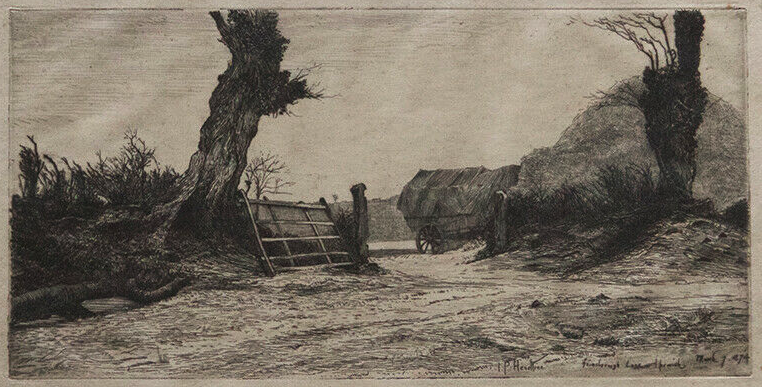
Sketch of Gainsborough Lane, Ipswich by Heseltine

Heseltine was born on 6 January 1843 in Dilham, Norfolk. He was a son of Mary and Edward Heseltine. His brother was Rev. Ernest Heseltine, M.A. of Sandringham, who assisted the officiation of his eldest daughter Dorothy's marriage to Viscount Cantelupe in 1890. Through his brother Ernest, he was uncle to civil servant Michael Heseltine, the Registrar of the General Medical Council between 1933 and 1951.

In 1859, at age 16, he was sent to Hanover to learn German. While there, he was introduced to etching on copper by Major van Usslar-Gleichen. Heseltine quickly became a skilled draughtsman and printmaker and exhibited his first etching, Hastings, at the Royal Academy in 1869. He joined the Etching Club in 1877, and was a founding member of the Society of Painter-Etchers in 1880.

== Career ==
Heseltine was a stockbroker and senior partner in the family firm, Heseltine, Powell & Co., which was founded by his father and Charles W. Marten in 1848 as Marten & Heseltine, and dealt particularly in American railroad bonds and shares. After his father retired, Thomas Wilde Powell was senior partner and Heseltine was junior partner. They supported bond issues for the New York and Erie Rail Road, Baltimore and Ohio Railroad (1873) and Pennsylvania Railroad (1876). Many years after his death, the name of the company changed to Heseltine, Moss & Co. in 1977 and the business became part of Brown Shipley Ltd. in 1987.

=== Art collection ===
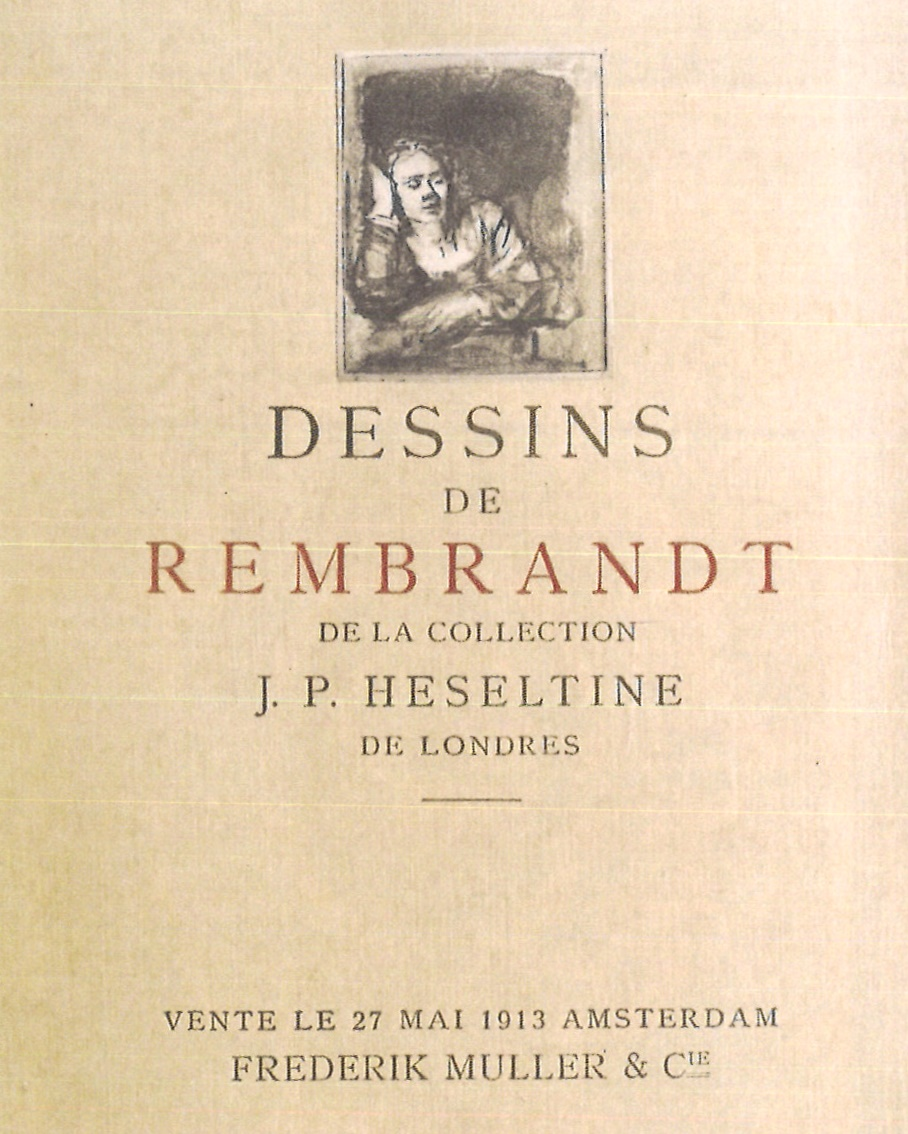
Auction catalogue of the Rembrandt drawings (1913)

From 1893 until his death in 1929, Heseltine was a trustee of the National Gallery and advised on the purchase of paintings, particularly works from the Dutch and Flemish schools. Beginning in 1905 and lasting for the eighteen month period between Sir Edward Poynter's retirement as director and the appointment of Charles Holroyd, he shared responsibility for running the Gallery with Lord Carlisle, a fellow trustee.

"Heseltine was a keen collector of oil paintings, drawings and watercolours of the English and Continental schools. Among the old master drawings were specimens by Rembrandt, Rubens, Raphael, Michelangelo, Fra Bartolomeo, Holbein, Dürer, Constable, Watteau and Boucher." In 1912, after fifty years of collecting, he sold his collection of over 600 old master drawings to the London dealer Colnaghi & Obach for a price near $1,000,000. Thirty-two of his Rembrandt drawings sold the following May at what was then a high average of over $3,750 per drawing. In his collection, Heseltine also amassed a substantial collection of etchings by the Norwich School of painters.

== Personal life ==
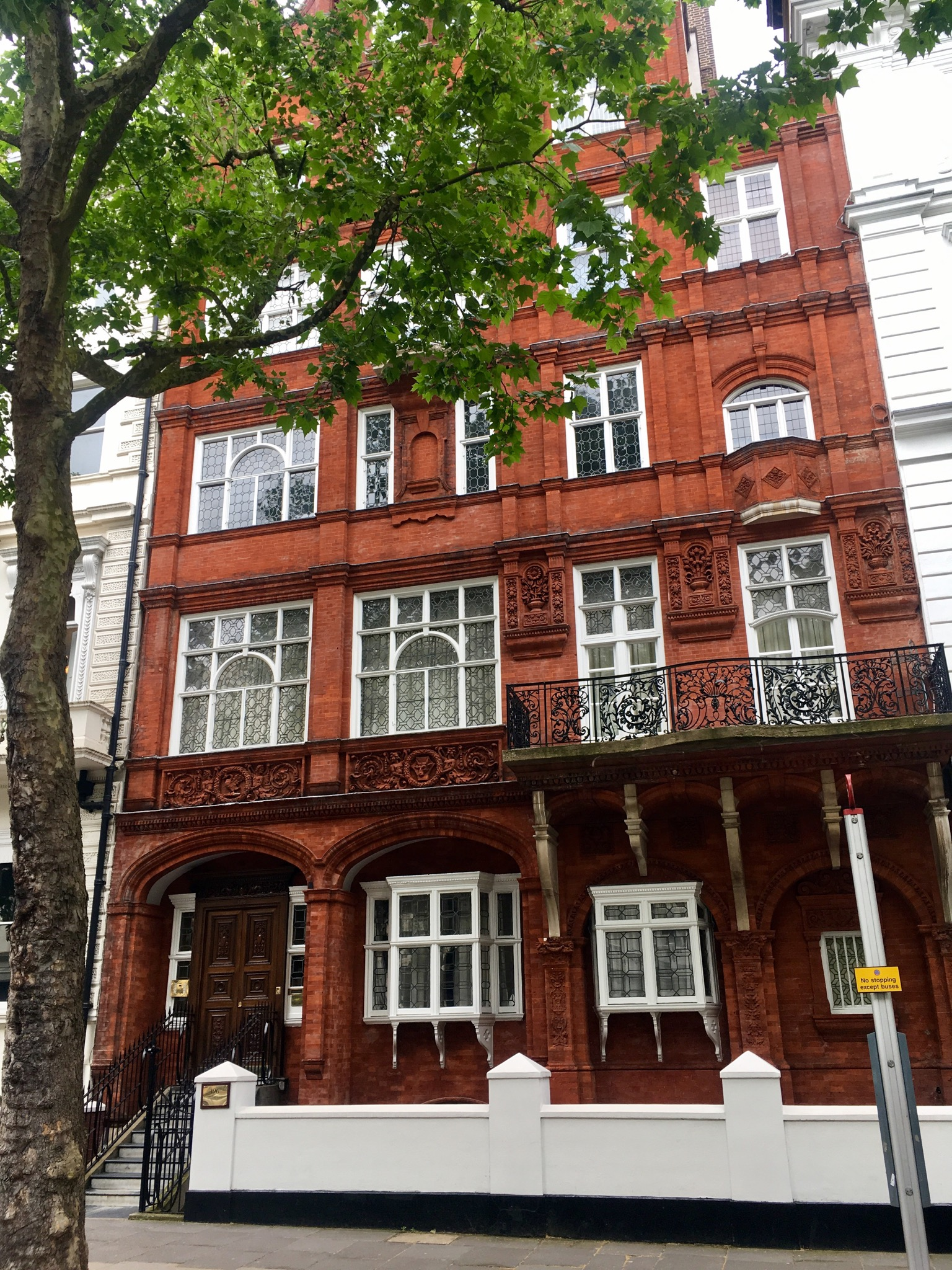
Heseltine's South Kensington residence at 196 Queen's Gate

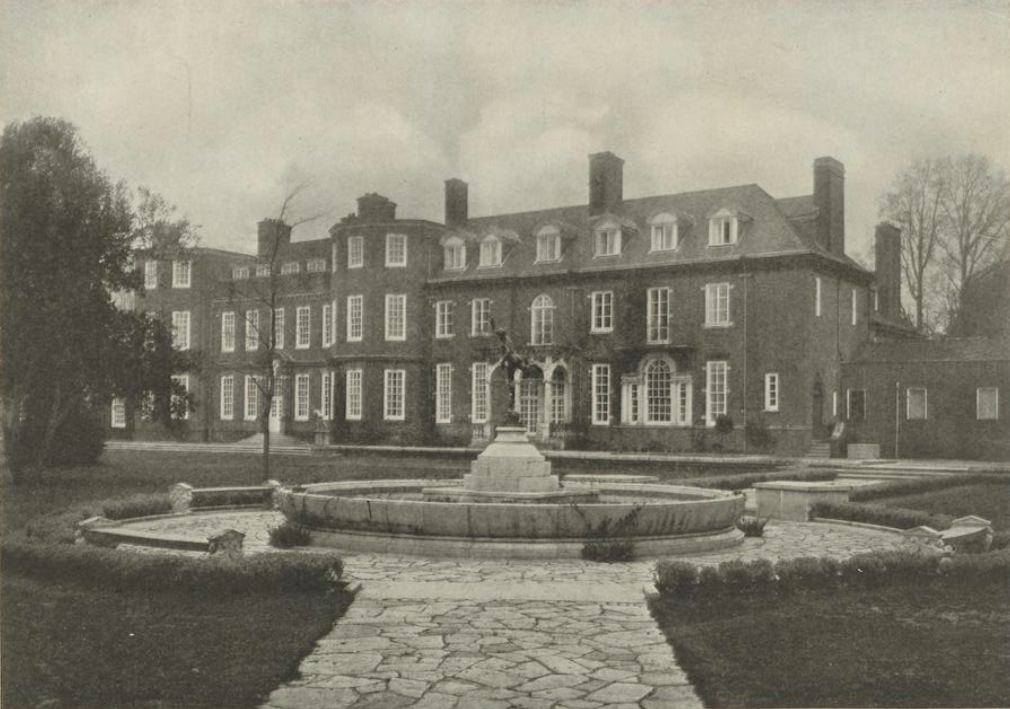
Walhampton House

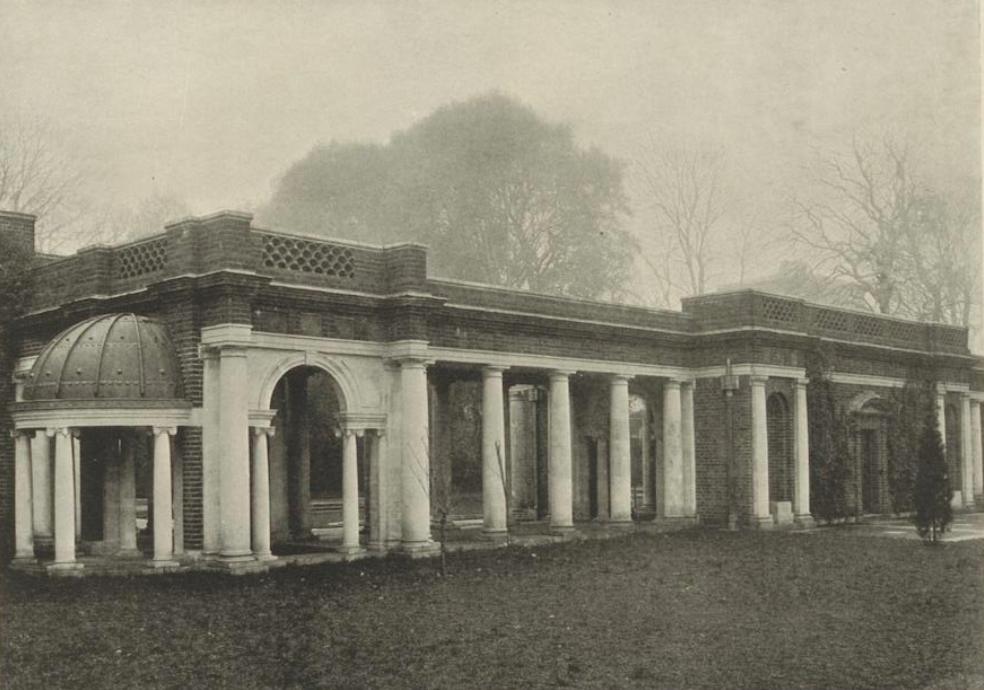
Garden cloisters at Walhampton

On 29 May 1866, Heseltine was married to Sarah "Sally" Edmondson (12 July 1838 – 11 January 1935), a daughter of Sarah (née Watson) Edmondson and Christopher Edmondson of Settle, York. Together, they were the parents of seven children, including:

- Sylvia Heseltine (b. 1868), who married Maj. Sir Philip Hunloke, a grandson of Sophia Sidney, Baroness De L'Isle and Dudley (the eldest illegitimate daughter of William IV of the United Kingdom through his relationship with Dorothea Jordan), in 1892.
- Christopher Heseltine (1869–1944), England Test cricketer who married Ethel Alice Crosse, widow of Percy John Howes, in 1923.
- Dorothy Heseltine (1870–1953), who married Lionel Sackville, Viscount Cantelupe in 1890; After his death in a boating accident a few months after their marriage, she married George Jeffreys, 1st Baron Jeffreys.
- Godfrey Heseltine (1871–1932), educated at Eton and Cambridge and served in the Boer War; he married Jessie Maud Fraser, widow of Sir Robert Wrey, 11th Baronet, in 1918.
- J.E.N. Heseltine, who became a Lt.-Col. of the King's Royal Rifle Corps in the British Army and was awarded the Distinguished Service Order.
- Diana Elizabeth Postle Heseltine (1877–1955), who married Augustus Whitehorn Addinsell, a son of Samuel Augustus Addinsell.
- Clarissa Mary Heseltine (1878–1967), who married Charles W. Sofer Whitburn, son of Charles Joseph Sofer Whitburn, at St Paul's Church, Knightsbridge in 1902. She was well known as a racehorse breeder, and at one point live at Amport House, near Andover, Hampshire.

Heseltine died at his home in Eaton Square on 2 March 1929 and his widow died on 11 January 1935.

=== Residences ===
From 1877 to 1925, Heseltine lived at 196 Queen's Gate in South Kensington, London, which was designed by architect Norman Shaw for Heseltine. From 1925 until his death in 1929, he lived at Eaton Square in London's Belgravia district.

In 1883, Heseltine acquired Walhampton House in Walhampton, Hampshire as his country house. He again hired Shaw to remodel the house and, essentially, reconstruct the entire eastern part of the house and the Conservatory where he added a flat roof to be used as a roof garden. Harold Peto added an Italian terrace and sunken garden, the Roman arch and the Glade and Chinese boathouse. Heseltine sold Walhampton House between 1910 and 1911 to Dorothy Morrison (a daughter of James Morrison), who shortly thereafter married the diplomat and historian Stafford Harry Northcote, Viscount Saint Cyres in 1912. Before her marriage, she hired landscape architect Thomas Hayton Mawson to redesign the vast grounds. After their deaths in 1924 and 1926, the estate was left to Lady Saint Cyres' nephew and was eventually sold in 1948 to Audrey Brewer, who used the house and grounds to establish Walhampton School.

=== Philanthropy ===
During his lifetime, he donated several paintings to the National Gallery, including: The Virgin and Child with Six Angels and Two Cherubim, by Francesco d'Antonio; A Cowherd passing a Horse and Cart in a Stream by Jan Siberechts; A Garden Scene with Waterfowl by Anthonie van Borssom; The Sea near Palavas after Gustave Courbet; and Portrait of Johannes Feige by Lucas Cranach the Elder.

In July 1929, his widow donated four of his 'Note Books' and Jean-Étienne Liotard's Portrait of a Grand Vizir to the National Gallery in his memory.

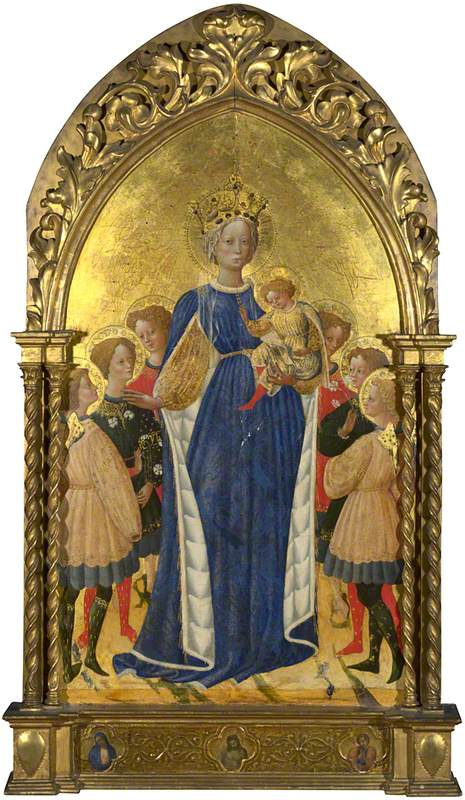
The Virgin and Child with Six Angels and Two Cherubim, by Francesco d'Antonio

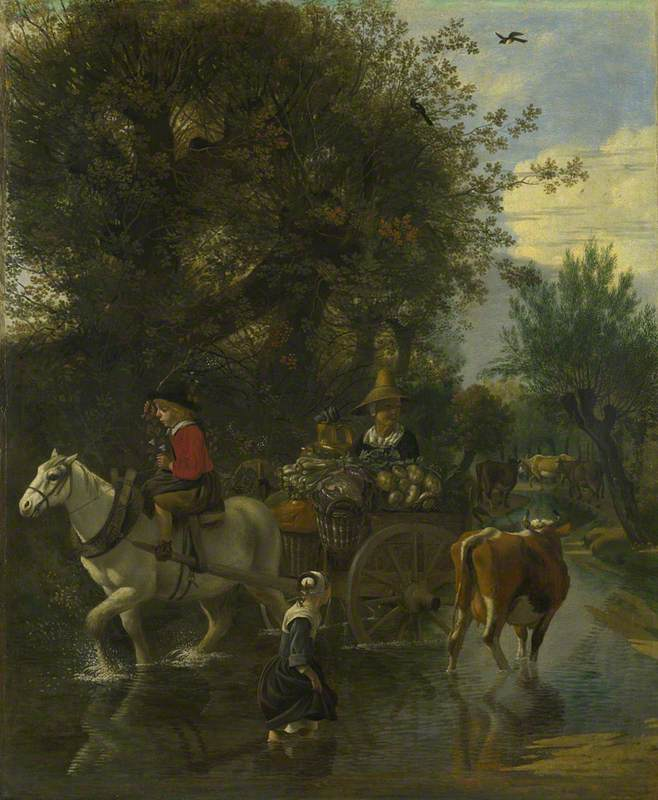
A Cowherd passing a Horse and Cart in a Stream by Jan Siberechts

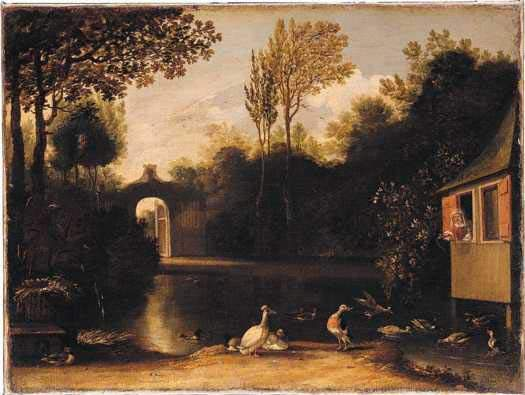
A Garden Scene with Waterfowl by Anthonie van Borssom

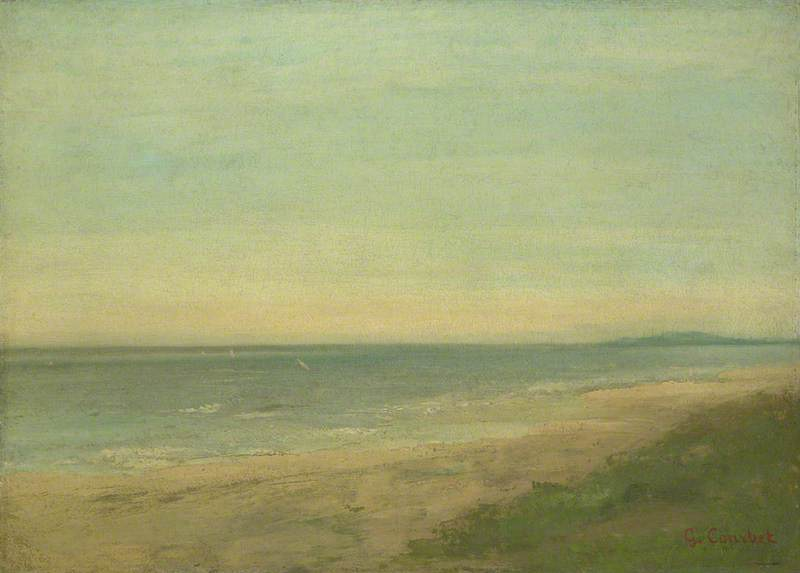
The Sea near Palavas after Gustave Courbet

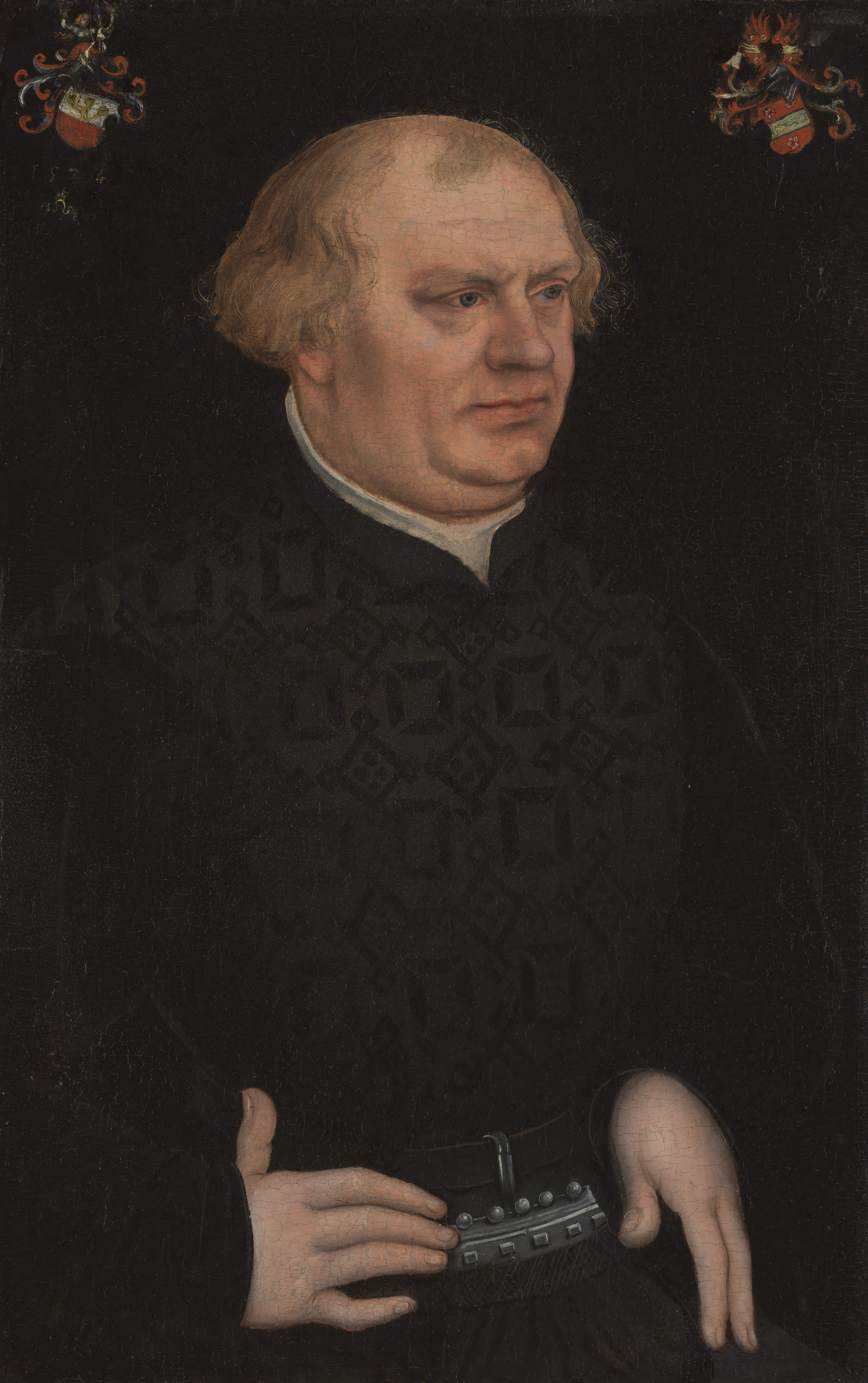
Portrait of Johannes Feige by Lucas Cranach the Elder

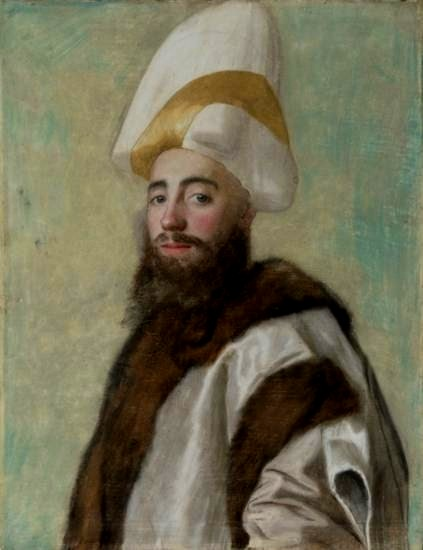
Portrait of a Grand Vizir by Jean-Étienne Liotard
