= Henry George Todd =

English painter

Henry George Todd (20 January 1847, in Bury St Edmunds – 30 June 1898, in Ipswich) was an English artist active in Suffolk.

Henry was the son of George Todd (1820–1904), a painter and decorator and grainer to whom he became apprenticed. In 1865 he attended art school and later progressed onto the Royal College of Art. He returned to Bury St Edmunds but then moved to Ipswich living at 1 Rope Walk by 1871. He worked for Alfred Stearn & Son, whose decorating company was highly regarded. Henry worked full-time, completing a number of commissions for shop fronts.

He is buried in Old Ipswich Cemetery.

== Gallery ==
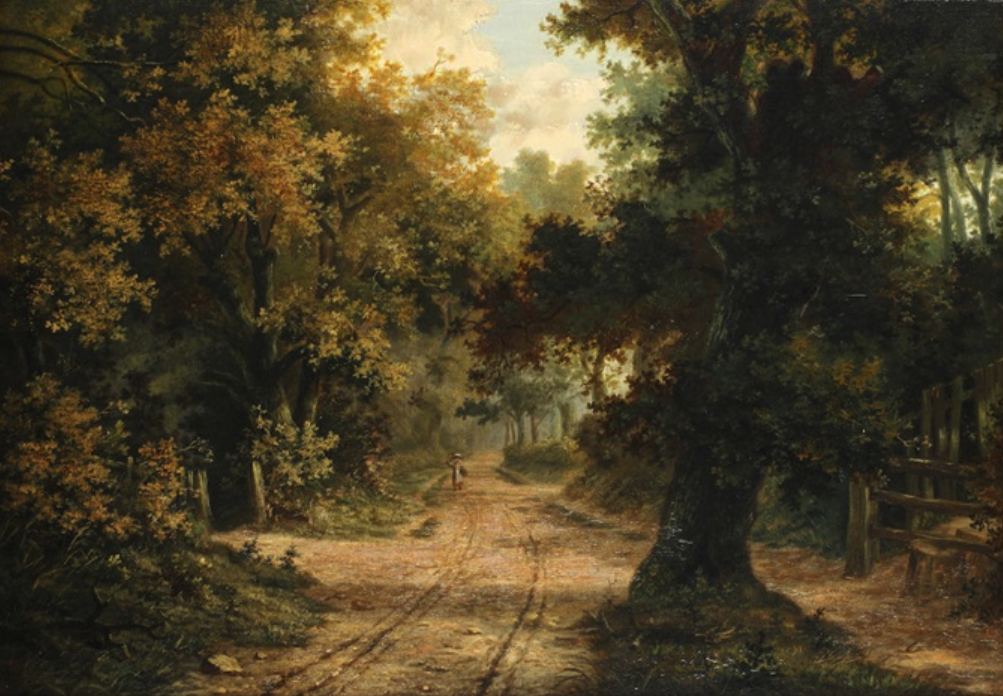
Gainsborough Lane, Ipswich
