= Carnser =

Causeway or raised bank or embankment

A carnser or caurnser is a causeway or raised bank or embankment. The term is from East Anglian English which arose in Norfolk and Suffolk. It has had little use outside this area. In Norfolk the term has been used for a causeway across a marsh. In Ipswich, Suffolk it has been used to describe remnants of the town's earthen ramparts, which provided a raised area on which houses were built. Elsewhere the term was applied to a raised walkway whereby pedestrians could avoid walking in water flowing in the street, as in Stoke Street. This has since been removed.

The historic use with the variant use of "Caunsey" has been found dating back to 1564. In a discussion of Norfolk dialect, a "Lover of Norfolk" stated:

". . . a narrow water course through a marsh is a 'mashe deke,' and a road between two 'dekes' is a 'carnser' (causeway); but a bank is a 'deke' for all that."

== Gallery ==
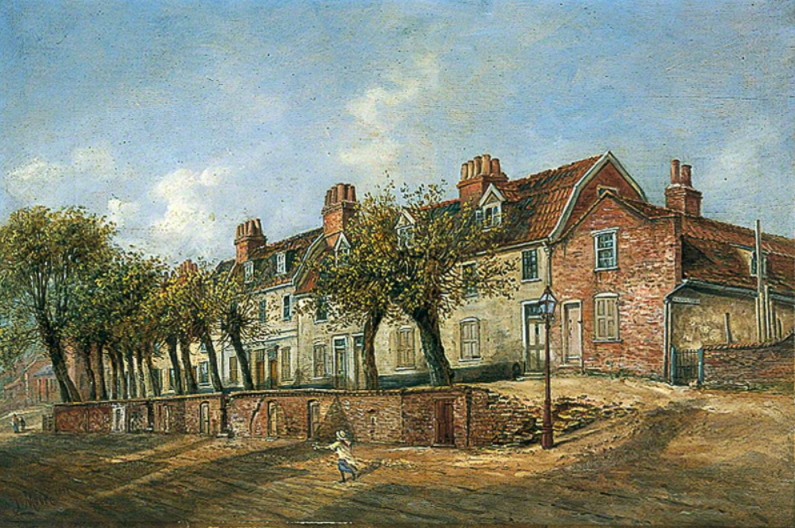
Painting by John Moore: Old Tower Ramparts (lately demolished) Ipswich (1882) illustrating the carnser there

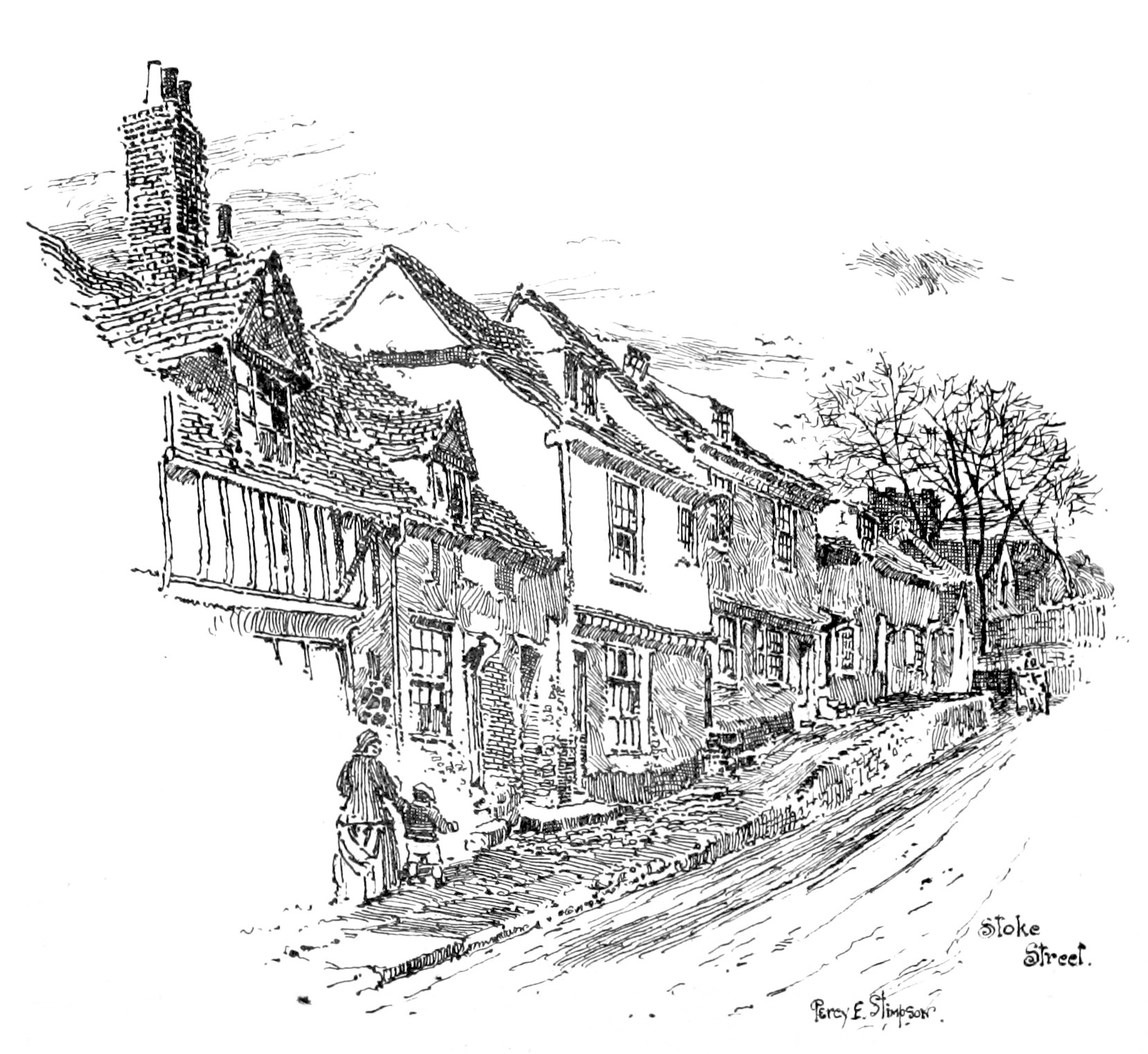
Illustration by Percy E. Stimpson (1888) of the carnser that was in Stoke Street at that time

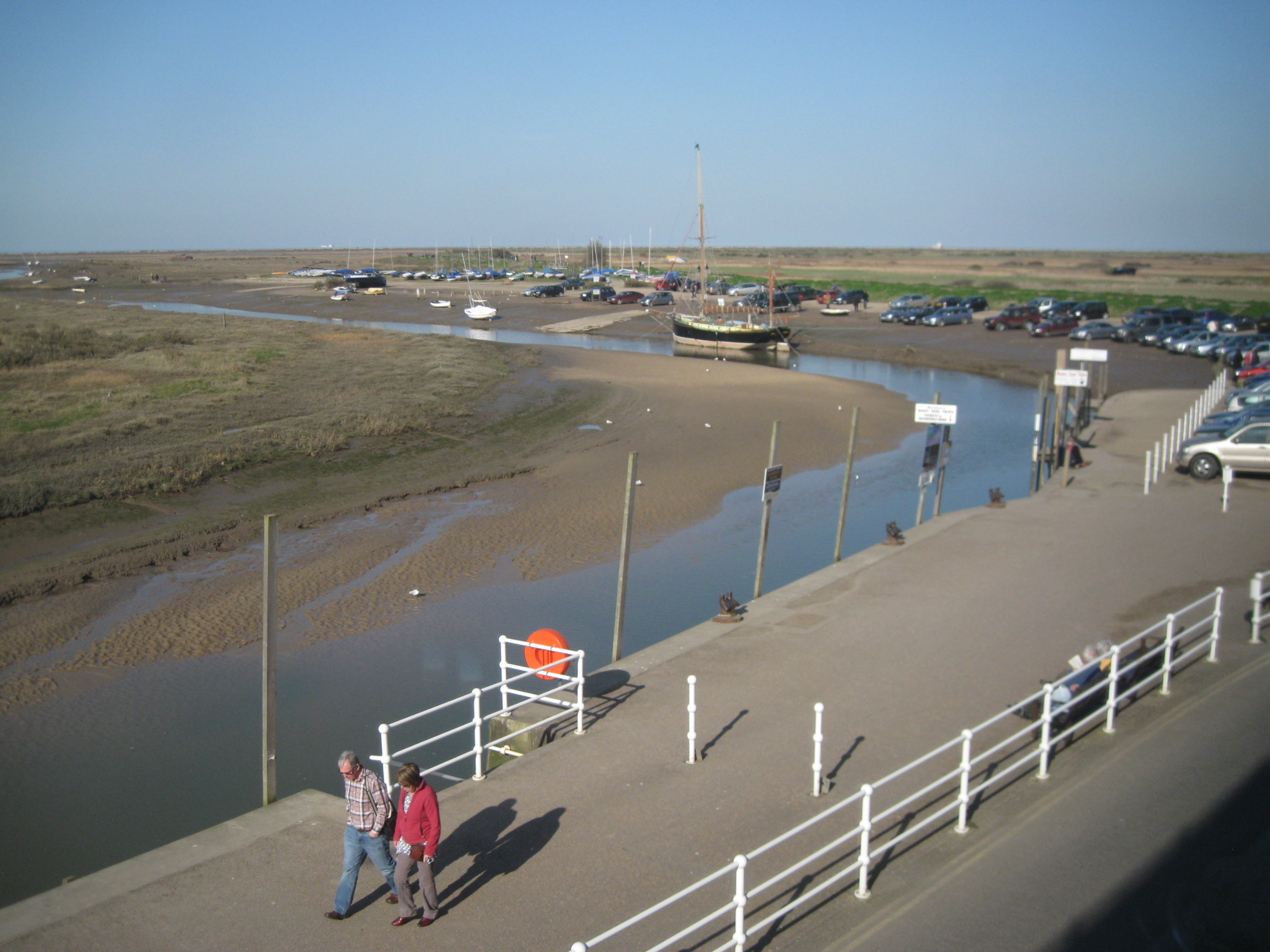
Carnser in Blakeney, Norfolk

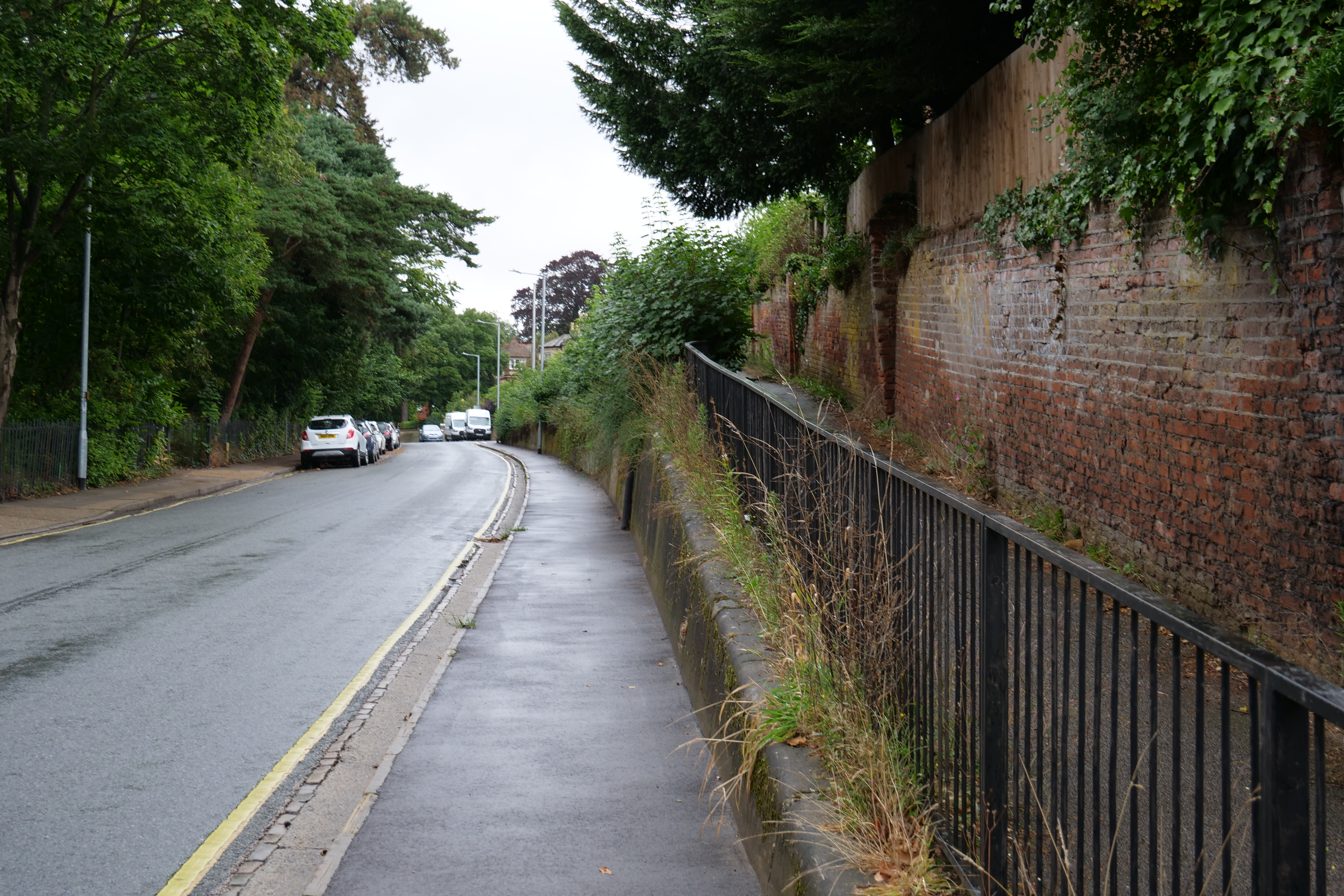
Carnser, Westerfield Road, Ipswich, (2021)
