= Medical Act 1971 =

Malaysian law

Parliament of Malaysia
- Long title: An Act to consolidate and amend the law relating to the registration and practice of medical practitioners and for national purposes to provide for certain provisions with regard to a period of service in the public services after full registration as a medical practitioner; and to make provision for purposes connected with the aforesaid matter.
- Citation: Act 50
- Territorial extent: Throughout Malaysia
- Passed by: Dewan Rakyat
- Passed: 29 July 1971
- Passed by: Dewan Negara
- Passed: 5 August 1971
- Royal assent: 27 September 1971
- Commenced: 30 September 1971
- Effective: [Throughout Malaysia—1 October 1971]

Legislative history

Initiating chamber: Dewan Rakyat
- Bill title: Medical Bill 1971
- Bill citation: D.R. 88/1971
- Introduced by: Sardon Jubir, Minister of Health
- First reading: 5 July 1971
- Second reading: 28 July 1971
- Third reading: 29 July 1971

Revising chamber: Dewan Negara
- Bill title: Medical Bill 1971
- Bill citation: D.R. 88/1971
- Member(s) in charge: Sardon Jubir, Minister of Health
- First reading: 2 August 1971
- Second reading: 5 August 1971
- Third reading: 5 August 1971

Amended by
- Medical (Amendment of Second Schedule) Order 1975 [P.U. (A) 41/1975] Medical (Amendment) Act 1975 [Act A300] Medical (Amendment of Second Schedule) (No. 2) Order 1975 [P.U. (A) 311/1975] Medical Act (Amendment of Second Schedule) Order 1976 [P.U. (A) 27/1976] Medical Act (Amendment of Second Schedule) (No. 2) Order 1976 [P.U. (A) 101/1976] Medical (Amendment) Act 1976 [Act A362] Medical Act (Amendment of Second Schedule) Order 1977 [P.U. (A) 258/1977] Medical Act (Amendment of Second Schedule) Order 1978 [P.U. (A) 373/1978] Medical Act (Amendment of Second Schedule) Order 1979 [P.U. (A) 127/1979] Medical (Amendment of Second Schedule) (No. 2) Order 1979 [P.U. (A) 165/1979] Medical (Amendment) Act 1980 [Act A492] Medical (Amendment of Second Schedule) Order 1981 [P.U. (A) 180/1981] Medical Act (Amendment of Second Schedule) Order 1983 [P.U. (A) 460/1983] Medical (Amendment of Second Schedule) Order 1986 [P.U. (A) 73/1986] Medical (Amendment of Second Schedule) (No. 2) Order 1986 [P.U. (A) 123/1986] Medical (Amendment of Second Schedule) (No. 3) Order 1986 [P.U. (A) 229/1986] Medical (Amendment of Second Schedule) Order 1986–Corrigendum [P.U. (A) 230/1986] Medical (Amendment of Second Schedule) Order 1986 [P.U. (A) 392/1986] Medical (Amendment of Second Schedule) Order 1987 [P.U. (A) 251/1987] Medical (Amendment of Second Schedule) (No. 2) Order 1987 [P.U. (A) 285/1987] Medical (Amendment of Second Schedule) (No. 3) Order 1987 [P.U. (A) 375/1987] Medical (Amendment of Second Schedule) Order 1987–Corrigendum [P.U. (A) 388/1987] Medical (Amendment of Second Schedule) (No. 4) Order 1987 [P.U. (A) 391/1987] Medical (Amendment of Second Schedule) Order 1988 [P.U. (A) 172/1988] Medical (Amendment of Second Schedule) Order 1989 [P.U. (A) 82/1989] Medical (Amendment of Second Schedule) (No. 2) Order 1989 [P.U. (A) 372/1989] Medical (Amendment of Second Schedule) Order 1990 [P.U. (A) 351/1990] Medical (Amendment of Second Schedule) Order 1992 [P.U. (A) 45/1992] Medical (Amendment of Second Schedule) (No. 2) Order 1992 [P.U. (A) 377/1992] Medical (Amendment) Act 1993 [Act A840] Medical (Amendment of Second Schedule) Order 1993 [P.U. (A) 83/1993] Medical (Amendment of Second Schedule) Order 1994 [P.U. (A) 51/1994] Medical (Amendment of Second Schedule) (No.2) Order 1994 [P.U. (A) 307/1994] Medical (Amendment of Second Schedule) Order 1995 [P.U. (A) 46/1995] Medical (Amendment of Second Schedule) (No.2) Order 1995 [P.U. (A) 135/1995] Medical (Amendment of Second Schedule) (No.3) Order 1995 [P.U. (A) 391/1995] Medical (Amendment of Second Schedule) (No.4) Order 1995 [P.U. (A) 404/1995] Medical (Amendment) Act 1995 [Act A932] Medical (Amendment of Second Schedule) Order 1996 [P.U. (A) 200/1996] Medical (Amendment of Second Schedule) Order 1996 [P.U. (A) 353/1996] Medical (Amendment of Second Schedule) (No.2) Order 1996 [P.U. (A) 354/1996] Medical (Amendment of Second Schedule) Order 1997 [P.U. (A) 144/1997] Medical (Amendment of Second Schedule) Order 1999 [P.U. (A) 324/1999] Medical (Amendment of Second Schedule) Order 2000 [P.U. (A) 143/2000] Medical (Amendment of Second Schedule) (No.2) Order 2000 [P.U. (A) 371/2000] Medical (Amendment of Second Schedule) Order 2002 [P.U. (A) 77/2002] Medical (Amendment of Second Schedule) (No. 2) Order 2002 [P.U. (A) 132/2002] Medical (Amendment of Third Schedule) Order 2003 [P.U. (A) 93/2003] Medical (Amendment of Second Schedule) Order 2003 [P.U. (A) 177/2003] Medical (Amendment of Second Schedule) (No. 2) Order 2003 [P.U. (A) 391/2003] Medical (Amendment of Third Schedule) Order 2004 [P.U. (A) 116/2004] Medical (Amendment of First Schedule) Order 2004 [P.U. (A) 189/2004] Medical (Amendment of Second Schedule) Order 2005 [P.U. (A) 171/2005] Medical (Amendment of Third Schedule) Order 2005 [P.U. (A) 172/2005] Medical (Amendment of Second Schedule) Order 2012 [P.U. (A) 281/2012] Medical (Amendment of Second Schedule) Order 2013 [P.U. (A) 111/2013] Medical (Amendment of Second Schedule) (No.2) Order 2013 [P.U. (A) 149/2013] Medical (Amendment of Second Schedule) (No.3) Order 2013 [P.U. (A) 311/2013] Medical (Amendment of Second Schedule) (No.4) Order 2013 [P.U. (A) 329/2013] Medical (Amendment of Second Schedule) Order 2014 [P.U. (A) 5/2014] Medical (Amendment of Second Schedule) (No.2) Order 2014 [P.U. (A) 293/2014] Medical (Amendment of Second Schedule) Order 2015 [P.U. (A) 33/2015] Medical (Amendment of Second Schedule) (No. 2) Order 2015 [P.U. (A) 41/2015]

Related legislation
- Emergency (Essential Powers) Ordinance No. 65, 1971 [P.U.(A)11/1971] Medical Registration Ordinance 1952 of the States of Malaya [F.M. 69 of 1952] Medical Registration Ordinance of Sabah [Cap. 76] Medical Registration Ordinance of Sarawak [Cap. 112]
- Status: In force

The Medical Act 1971 (Malay: Akta Perubatan 1971), is an Act of the Parliament of Malaysia. It was enacted to consolidate and amend the law relating to the registration and practice of medical practitioners and for national purposes to provide for certain provisions with regard to a period of service in the public services after full registration as a medical practitioner; and to make provision for purposes connected with the aforesaid matter.

== Structure ==
The Medical Act 1971, in its current form (1 May 2015), consists of 7 Parts containing 44 sections and 3 schedules (including 63 amendments).

- Part I: Preliminary
- Part II: The Malaysian Medical Council
- Part III: Registration of Medical Practitioners
- Part IV: Disciplinary Proceedings
- Part V: General
- Part VI: Regulations, Saving and Repeal
- Part VII: Supplementary Provisions for National Purposes
- Schedules

The Medical Act 1971 is currently amended by the Medical (Amendment) Act 2012 which came into force on 1 July 2017.

== See also ==
- Medical Act
