= Beatrice Cartwright =

English local politician and amateur cricketer (fl. 1888 – 1922)

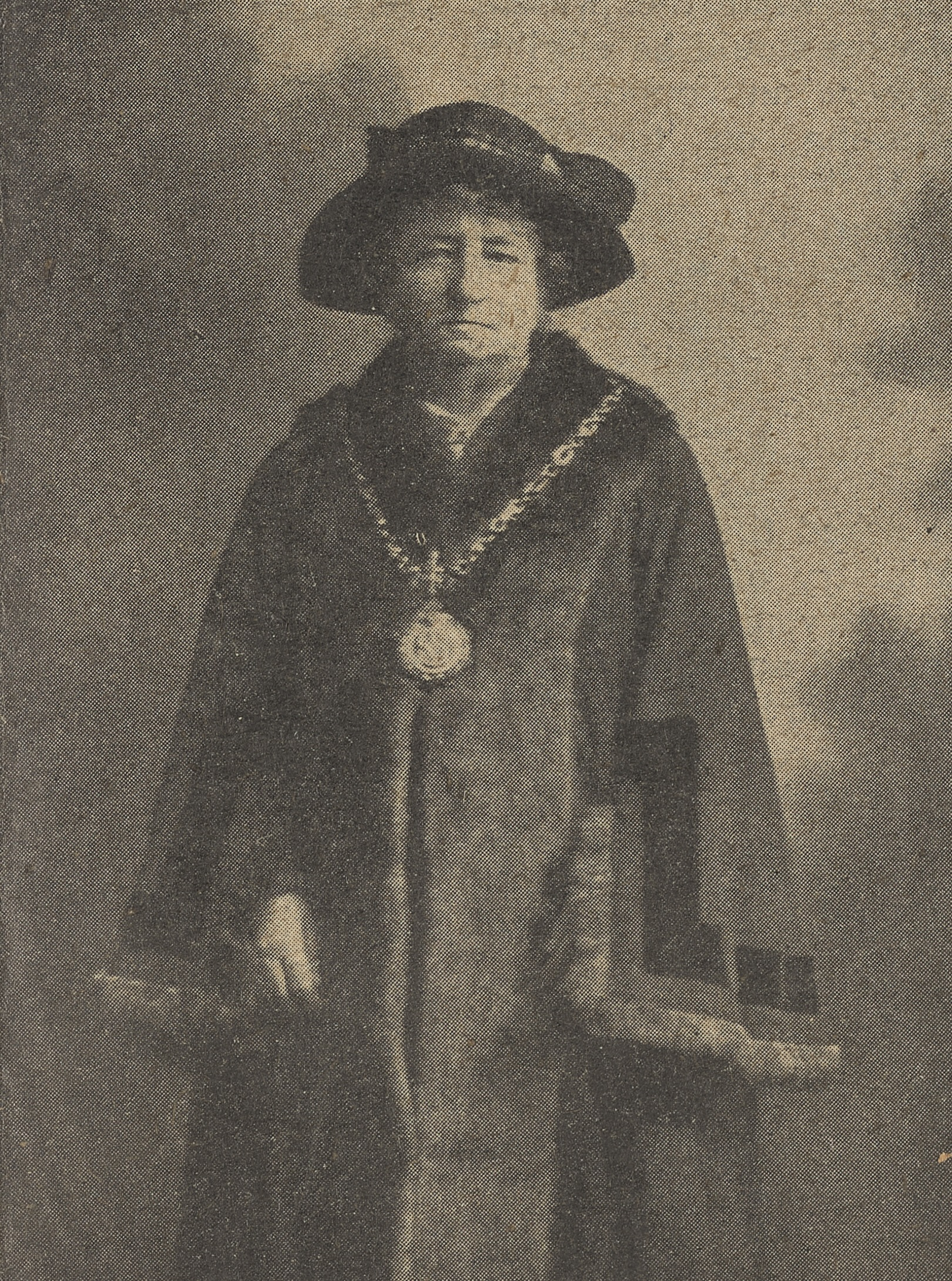
Beatrice Cartwright, 1922

Beatrice Anna Cartwright MBE (fl. 1888 – 1934) was an English local politician.

She was the daughter of Richard Aubrey Cartwright, who served as Lord Lieutenant of Northamptonshire. She had several siblings including the art critic Julia Cartwright Ady.

In 1888, she captained an active women’s cricket team which drew interest in the press as it played other women’s teams, including Dorothy Heseltine’s Hampshire eleven and a side raised by Florence Wray Myers.

Beatrice held several positions in the town of Brackley, Northamptonshire, including Justice of the Peace, Poor Law Guardian, and President of the Brackley Auxiliary. A member of the Primrose League, she founded a Brackley branch of the Red Cross and managed a convalescent home during World War I. In 1922, she became the first woman mayor of Brackley.

She received an MBE in 1934 in recognition of her political and public services in Northamptonshire.
