= Medical Act 1858 =

Act of the Parliament of the United Kingdom

Medical Act 1858 (Note: Section 1.)
- Act of Parliament
- Parliament of the United Kingdom
- Long title: An Act to Regulate the Qualifications of Practitioners in Medicine and Surgery.
- Citation: 21 & 22 Vict. c. 90
- Territorial extent: United Kingdom

Dates
- Royal assent: 2 August 1858
- Commencement: 1 October 1858 (Note: Section 2.)

Other legislation
- Amended by: Medical Act 1859; Medical Acts Amendment Act 1860; Statute Law Revision Act 1875; Perjury Act 1911; Territorial Army and Militia Act 1921; False Oaths (Scotland) Act 1933; Local Government Act 1933; Local Government (Scotland) Act 1947; Medical Act 1950; Medical Act 1956; Statute Law (Repeals) Act 1977; Statute Law (Repeals) Act 1986

Status: Partially repealed

Text of statute as originally enacted

Revised text of statute as amended

Text of the Medical Act 1858 as in force today (including any amendments) within the United Kingdom, from legislation.gov.uk.

The Medical Act (21 & 22 Vict. c. 90), An Act to Regulate the Qualifications of Practitioners in Medicine and Surgery, also referred to as the Medical Act 1858, is an act of the Parliament of the United Kingdom which created the General Medical Council to regulate doctors in the UK. It is one of the Medical Acts. Describing its purpose, the Act notes that "it is expedient that Persons requiring Medical Aid should be enabled to distinguish qualified from unqualified Practitioners".

The act creates the position of Registrar of the General Medical Council – an office still in existence today – whose duty is to keep up-to-date records of those registered to practise medicine and to make them publicly available.

The act has now been almost entirely repealed. The current law governing medical regulation is the Medical Act 1983.

Under the Poor Law system Board of guardians could only employ those qualified in medicine and surgery as Poor Law Doctors.

Under a clause in the act that recognised doctors with foreign degrees practising in Britain, Elizabeth Blackwell was able to become the first woman to have her name entered on the Medical Register (1 January 1859). The act also enabled the Royal College of Surgeons of England to be given a new charter allowing them conduct dental examinations.

== Subsequent developments ==
Sections 2–46 and 55 of, and schedules (A) and (D) to, the act were repealed by section 57(1) of, and the fifth schedule to, the Medical Act 1956 (4 & 5 Eliz. 2. c. 76), which came into force on 1 January 1957.

Section 53 of the act was repealed by section 1(1) of, and part XVII of schedule 1 to, the Statute Law (Repeals) Act 1977, which came into force on 16 June 1977.

Section 48–51 of the act were repealed by section 1(1) of, and part VIII of schedule 1 to, the Statute Law (Repeals) Act 1986, which came into force on 2 May 1986.
