= John Moore of Ipswich =

British painter (1820–1902)

John Moore
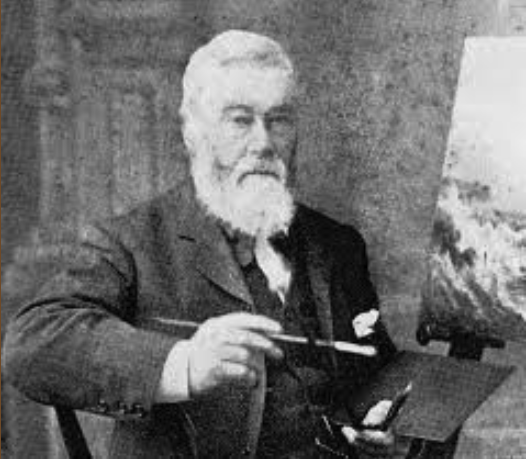
- Born: Woodbridge, Suffolk
- Baptised: 12 February 1821
- Died: April 8, 1902 (aged 81)
- Resting place: Old Ipswich Cemetery

John Moore (12 February 1821, Woodbridge – 8 April 1902, Diss) was a prominent Ipswich artist, particularly noted for his seascapes. Originally a painter and decorator, he became a self-taught artist. He moved to Ipswich before 1871, and was a founding member of the Ipswich Fine Art Club in 1874. He found many patrons amongst the wealthy inhabitants of the town.

== Early life ==
Moore was born in what is now Theatre Street, Woodbridge, and was baptised on 12 February 1821 at St Mary's Church. His father was a former sailor, Martin Moore, who had since become a plumber and house painter. His mother was Elizabeth (née Warren). John started out apprenticed to his father as a plumber and signwriter. In 1843 he married Caroline Upson, with whom he had a son, also called John. By 1868 he was living in Ipswich, but still working as a signwriter for Jacob Mules of Orwell Place.

== Career as an artist ==
He exhibited his work at the Ipswich Exhibition of Fine Arts and Industries, held in the Assembly Rooms, Ipswich in September 1868. By 1871 he was supporting his family as an artist and living in Ward's Court, 6 Tower Terrace, Ipswich.

== Final days ==
Following the death of his wife he went to live with a friend called Mr Scolding in Diss. He died on 8 April 1902 and was buried in Old Ipswich Cemetery.

== Gallery ==
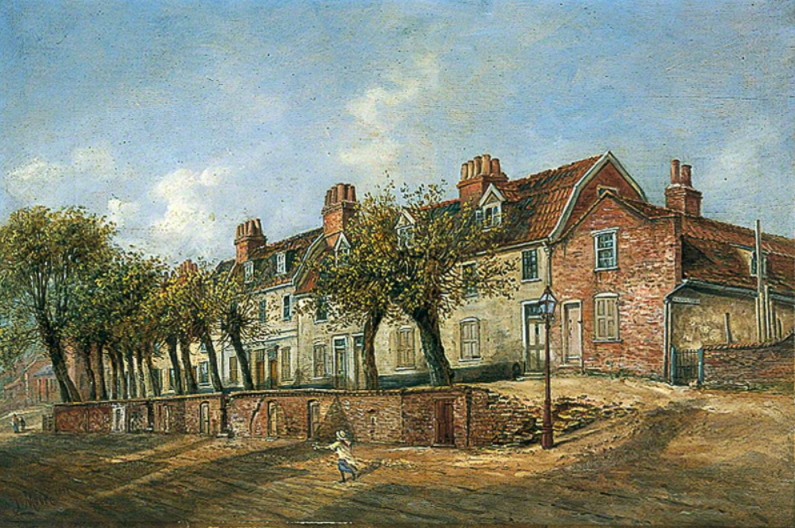
1882: Old Tower Ramparts (lately demolished) illustrating the carnser there
