= Old Ipswich Cemetery =

Cemetery in Ipswich, Suffolk, England

Coordinates: 52°03′54″N 1°10′06″E

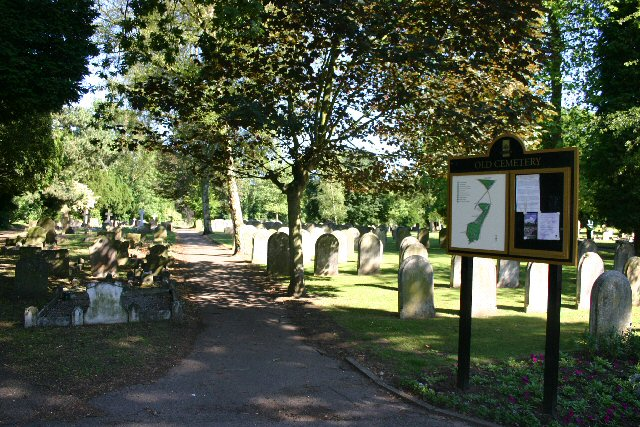
Old Ipswich Cemetery, June 2006

Old Ipswich Cemetery is a cemetery in Ipswich, Suffolk, which was opened in 1855. It is one of a group of cemeteries run by Ipswich Borough Council.

== History ==
Following the passage of the Burial Act 1854 (17 & 18 Vict c 87), Municipal Borough of Ipswich was empowered to establish a Burial Board. This they did in August of that year, and arranged to buy some land to the North East of the town from John Cobbold. The cemetery was laid out by William Davidson, with access provided by Cemetery Road. William Hunt described it in 1864 thus:

"The grounds are extensive, beautifully formed of gentle hill and valley and dotted with young shrubberies with wide gravelled paths winding and intersecting each other, the whole entirely surrounded by trees which cannot, however, entirely shut out the panorama of the town stretching below,–a picture of the busy life which lies outside the burial place. There are some fine monuments here: also two pretty stone chapels,–one for church people, one for Dissenters; and a dead house almost concealed among the trees. The Cemetery grounds are kept with remarkable care and taste."

== Religious buildings ==
There are two religious buildings in the Old cemetery, both built by Cooper and Peck in time for the opening cemetery in 1855. Located about 50 metres apart, there is a very large spruce tree between them. They are to a great the same as one another. However the westerly chapel is Anglican and has a copper spire, whilst the easterly chapel is non conformist.

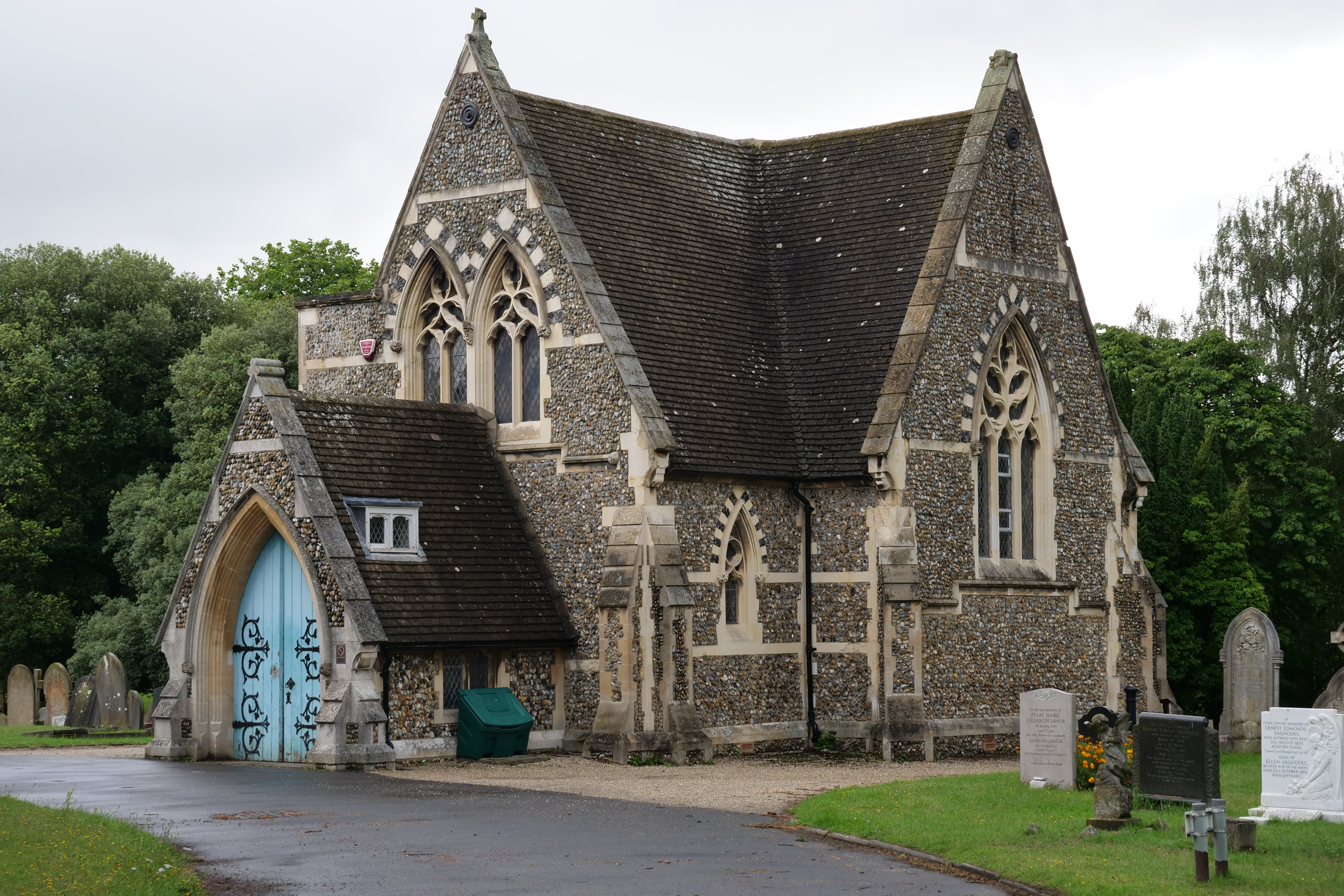
Non Conformist chapel

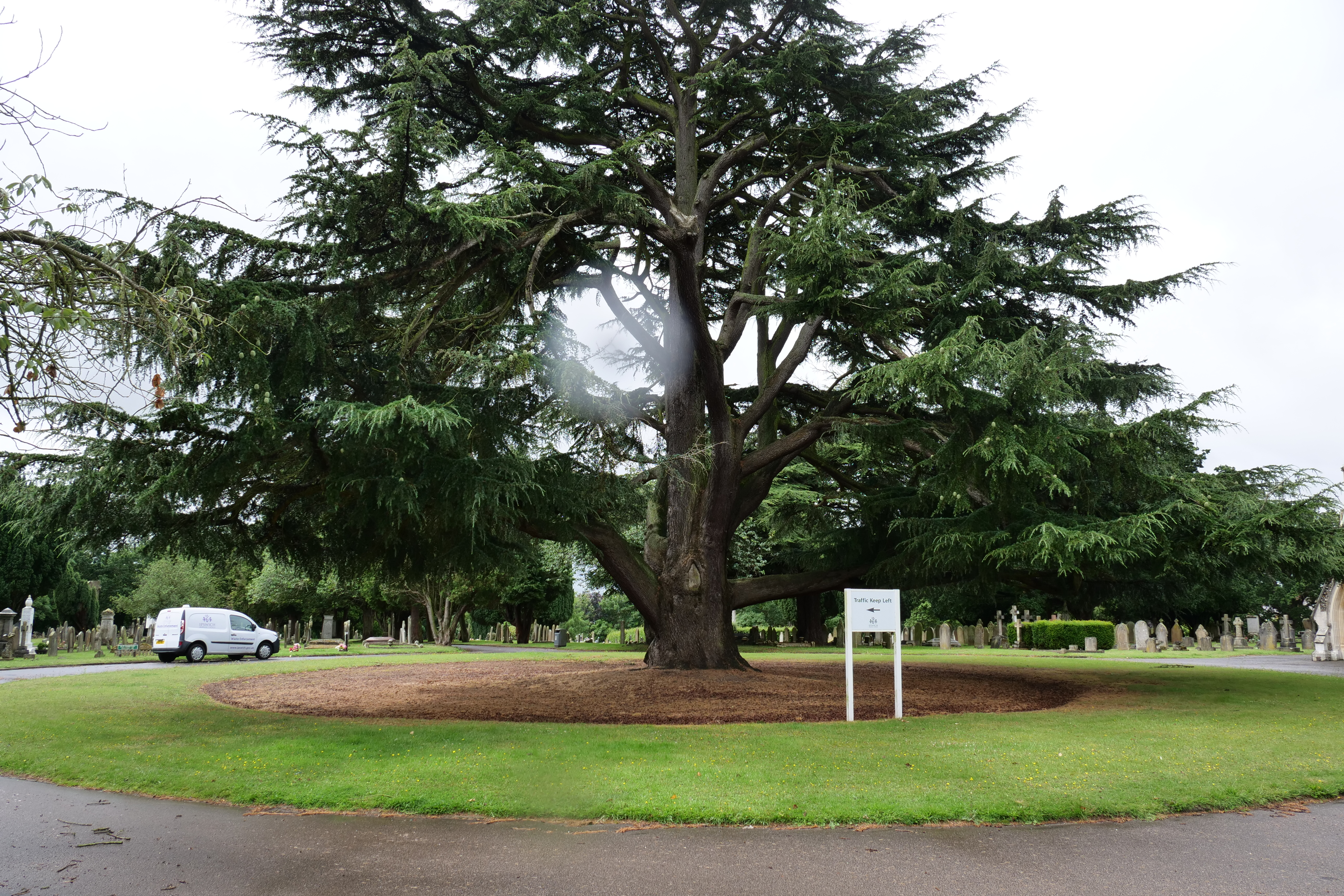
Tree between two chapels

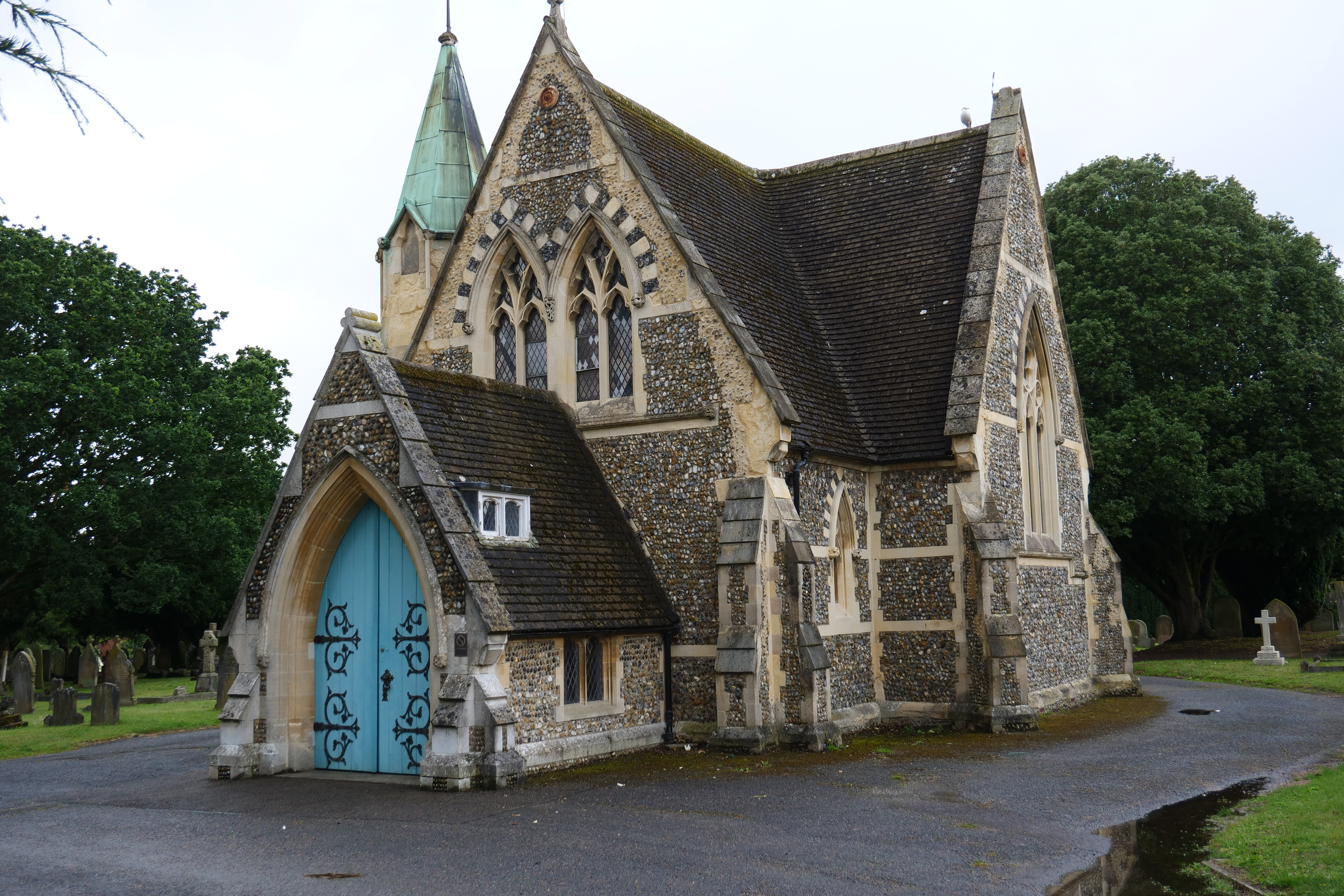
Anglican chapel

== War graves ==
The cemetery contains 366 war graves of Commonwealth service personnel from the First and Second World War which are registered and maintained by the Commonwealth War Graves Commission.

== Notable people buried in Old Ipswich Cemetery ==
- Plot H 27-30: Clifford Grey (1887-1941)
- Plot X 21-3: Samuel Harvey (1881-1960)
- Plot OC 194: Alf Ramsey (1920-1999)
- John Moore of Ipswich (1820-1902)
- Frederick Brett Russell (1813 - 1869)
- Henry George Todd (1847 - 1898)
