= Medical Act =

Stock short title used for legislation

Medical Act is a stock short title used in Malaysia and the United Kingdom for legislation relating to medical practitioners.

== List ==
=== Malaysia ===
- The Medical Act 1971

=== United Kingdom ===
- The Medical Act 1956 (4 & 5 Eliz. 2. c. 76)
- The Medical Act 1983 (c. 54)

The Medical Acts was the collective title of the following acts:

- The Medical Act 1858 (21 & 22 Vict. c. 90)
- The Medical Act 1859 (22 Vict. c. 21)
- The Medical Acts Amendment Act 1860 (23 & 24 Vict. c .7)
- The Medical Practitioners Act 1876 (39 & 40 Vict. c. 40)
- The Medical Act 1876 (39 & 40 Vict. c. 41)
- The Medical Act 1886 (49 & 50 Vict. c. 48)

== See also ==
- List of short titles
