= Gainsborough Lane =

Road in Ipswich, Suffolk, England, UK

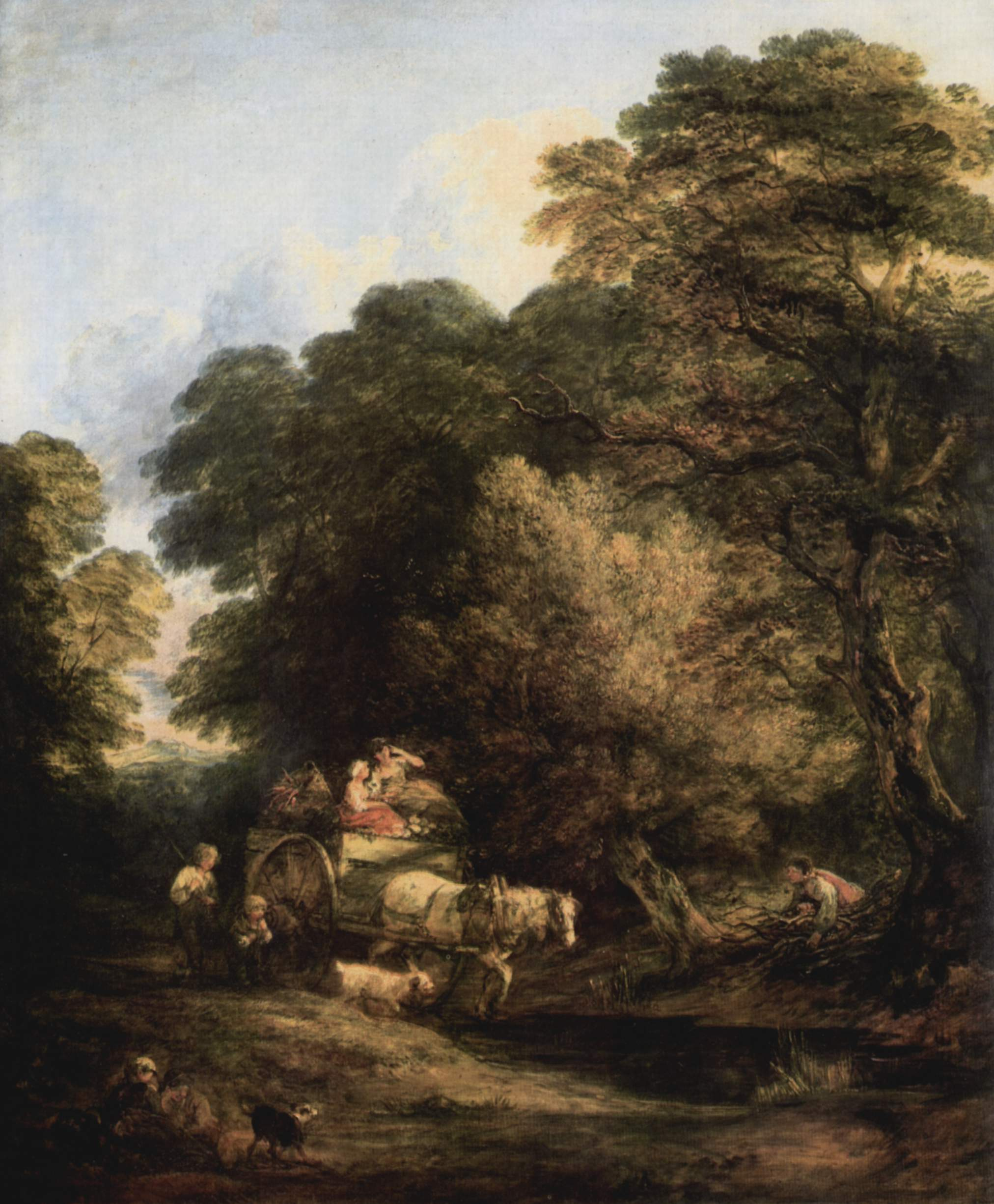
The Market Cart, a painting by Thomas Gainsborough depicting Gainsborough Lane (1786-1787)

Gainsborough Lane is a rural road in the South East Area, Ipswich which has been noted for its charm since the nineteenth century. In 1888 John Ellor Taylor, curator of Ipswich Museum, described it as the "dearest walk" available locally for Ipswich people.

In 1901 William Dutt wrote:

"When Gainsborough resided in Ipswich much of his time was spent on the banks of the Orwell, and a lane not far from the town, now known as Gainsborough's Lane, is depicted in his picture The Market Cart, which is in the National Gallery. This lane owes its beauty to its magnificent oaks, which interlace their branches above the turf-bordered footpath leading to the Priory Farmhouse in which Margaret Catchpole was employed as a domestic servant. This house was formerly an Augustinian monastery".

It proved a popular topic for local artists in the late nineteenth century such as John Postle Heseltine and Henry George Todd.

Gainsborough Lane leads from Pipers Vale to Priory Farm, once the workplace of Margaret Catchpole. Nowadays the Orwell Bridge crosses over it.

== Gainsborough Lane in art ==
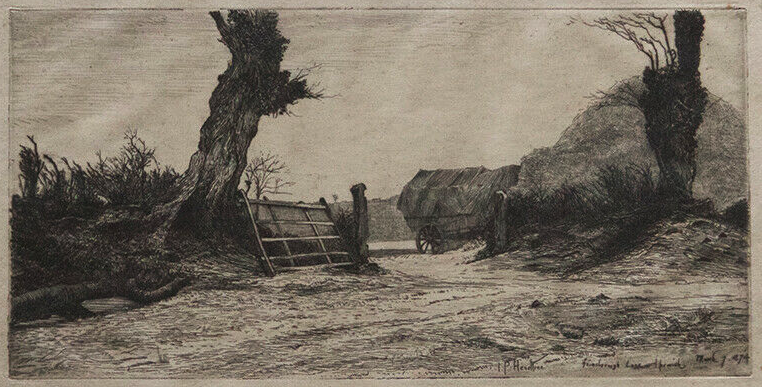
1874 by John Postle Heseltine

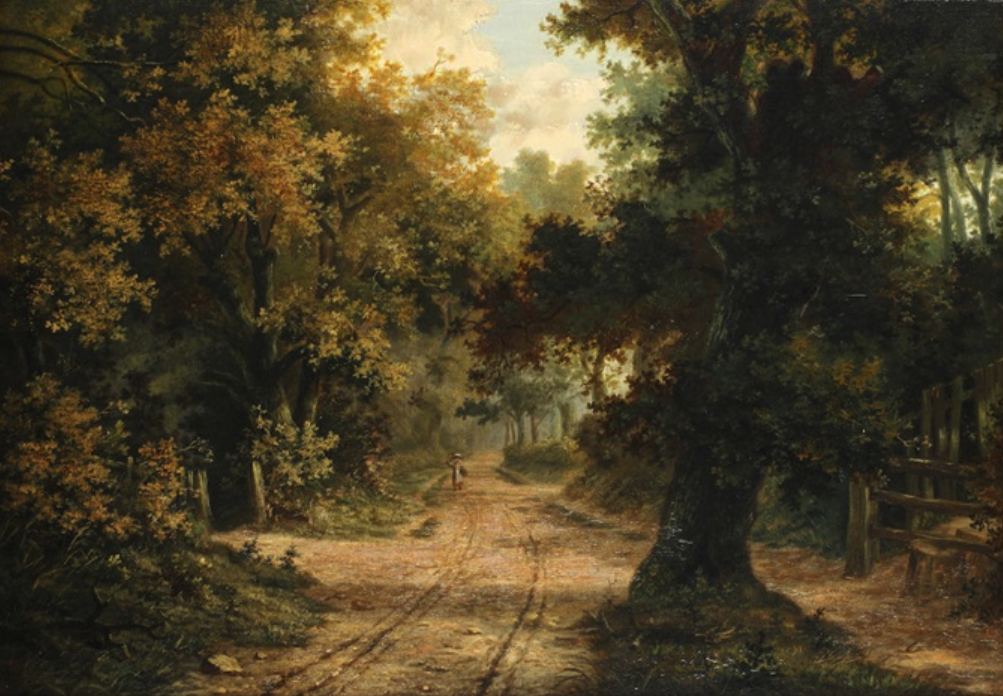
1887 by Henry George Todd
