= White Heather Club (cricket) =

First English women's cricket club (1887–1957)

The White Heather Club was a women’s cricket club founded in 1887 in Nun Appleton, Yorkshire which is often noted as the first cricket club for women. It was founded 'in consequence of the large amount of cricket at Normanhurst, Glynde, and Eridge,' the Sussex manor houses of the founders. In women's cricket, it developed out of country-house cricket and informal women's and mixed teams. An amateur club which drew mainly from the upper classes, it predated semi-professional women’s cricket such as the Original English Lady Cricketers. It was followed by a small number of other women’s clubs such as the Dragonflies and the Clifton Ladies' Club.

The Club was founded in the summer of 1887 by eight ladies, most of them from aristocratic backgrounds. By 1891 its membership had grown to fifty. The players wore the club's colours of pink, white and green on their ties, blazers and boaters.

The Club toured the country playing other women’s teams. From 1908 the team had a regular fixture against Miss Evelyn Tubb's Eleven in Oxfordshire. There was also an annual Married vs. Single game. Presidents of the club included Lucy Baldwin, who hosted a General Meeting of the club at her home at 10 Downing Street while her husband, Stanley Baldwin, was Prime Minister.

As part of a general decline in the membership of cricket clubs after World War II, the White Heather Club was dissolved in 1957.

== Founders ==
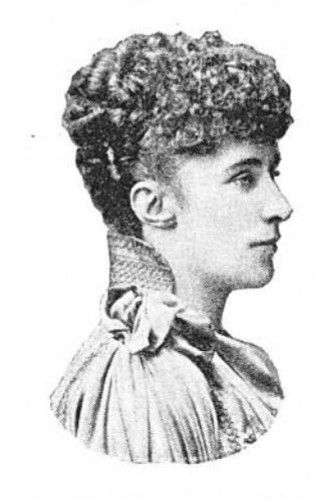
Lady Milner pictured alongside her chapter on cricket in 1892

- The Hon. M. Brassey
- The Hon. Beatrice Brassey (b. 1872), the daughter of Member of Parliament Henry Brassey. In 1899 she married Thomas Stacey. She played for the White Heather Club in 1908, making 2 not out, and sometimes captained her own teams.
- Lady Milner (1859–1902), who wrote the chapter on cricket for Lady Violet Greville's The Gentlewoman's Book of Sports. Born Adeline Gertrude Denison Beckett to Member of Parliament William Beckett-Denison, she married Sir Frederick Milner, 7th Baronet, in 1880, and they had three children.
- Lady Idina Nevill (1865–1961), Lady of Justice of the Order of St John of Jerusalem. She was the daughter of William Nevill, 1st Marquess of Abergavenny. The year after the club's founding, she appeared in a Nun Appleton cricket match, making scores of 25 and 22 for the winning side. In 1889 she married Thomas Brassey, 2nd Earl Brassey, with the bridesmaids wearing the colours of the cricket club she captained. Lady Brassey travelled widely with her husband and was proficient in several sports, including hunting, shooting and fishing.
- Lady Henry Nevill
- The Hon. Maud Lawrence
- Miss Chandos-Pole
- Miss Street

== Notable members ==
- Lucy Ridsdale, who averaged 62 with the bat in 1892, the year she married Prime Minister Stanley Baldwin.
- Dorothy Heseltine, founder of a Hampshire ladies' eleven, and her sister Sylvia Heseltine, founder of Finmere Ladies' team.
- Nona Hermon-Worsley (daughter of Robert Hermon-Hodge). In 1935 she played for Milney Manor against the White Heather Club, making 73 runs and taking seven wickets for 38.
- Ethel Smyth, a composer and suffragist, reported that 'during the summer of 1889 the cricket mania possessed all the young women of my acquaintance', and that her friendship with civil servant Meriel Talbot began on the cricket field.
