= Dorothy Heseltine =

English noblewoman and amateur cricketer (d.1953)

Dorothy Heseltine (also known as Dorothy Sackville, Viscountess Cantelupe and Dorothy Jeffreys, Lady Jeffreys, 1870–1953) was an English noblewoman and amateur cricketer.

Dorothy was the daughter of painter John Postle Heseltine. In 1890, she assembled a women's cricket team from Hampshire to play against Oxfordshire Ladies, captained by Beatrice Cartwright. The match, held at the Heseltine family home, Walhampton Park, was an early example of women's cricket being played between county sides and drew interest from the media. Dorothy's elder sister Sylvia, took five wickets in the match and later went on to create her own women's cricket team, Finmere Ladies. Dorothy and Sylvia both joined the White Heather Club for women's cricket.

In June 1890, Dorothy married Lionel Sackville, Viscount Cantelupe. Hr died by drowning when he was washed off his yacht in November of the same year. She then married General George Jeffreys, who was created 1st Baron Jeffreys in 1952, and they had a son, Christopher, who was killed in World War II.

Lady Jeffreys was a Chief Commandant in the Auxiliary Territorial Service between 1938 and 1941. She died in 1953.
