= History of medical regulation in the United Kingdom =

Medical regulation ensures that medicine is only practised by qualified and suitable people and can be used to prevent competition and increase financial compensation. The history of regulating doctors in the UK dates back around 600 years. The earliest licensing procedures were administered by the Church, with professional associations and universities also playing a role. Modern regulation of doctors is carried out by the General Medical Council.

== Early licensing ==
The earliest reference to medical regulation in the UK dates from 1421, when physicians petitioned parliament to ask that nobody without appropriate qualifications be allowed to practise medicine. The doctors said that unqualified practitioners caused "great harm and slaughter of many men".

Despite agreement in principle from parliament, little more appeared to happen until 1511, when a statute placed regulation of the medical profession in the hands of the bishops. John Raach wrote that "the Church was apparently considered the one institution whose influence was extensive and potent enough to be effective in suppressing quacks and licensing the members of the medical profession". Raach further suggested that as a learned profession, medicine "could not be relegated to regulation by the average county official". Clerics, often the most highly educated members of society, were better suited to the task. Medicine and religion were also closely entwined: healing had long been associated with the supernatural, while the events of birth and death involved both medics and clerics.

The purpose of the 1511 statute was to eliminate unqualified practitioners, and to that end it provided for a financial reward for those who reported them.

In 1518, the College of Physicians was founded and took over licensing of doctors in London. The college was founded by physicians themselves, meaning that in London the licensing of medicine was in the hands of the profession, rather than the bishop. Various disputes arose between the college, universities, and bishops over their authority to license and recognise each other's qualifications.

As doctors often covered large areas, crossing diocesan boundaries, they often required licenses from several bishops. At some point – it is unclear precisely when – archbishops were empowered to issue licenses for multiple dioceses. In the early seventeenth century, nearly a quarter of doctors received their licenses from archbishops.

=== Apothecaries Act 1815 ===
The Apothecaries Act introduced compulsory apprenticeship and formal qualifications for apothecaries, in modern terms general practitioners, under the license of the Society of Apothecaries.

== General Medical Council ==
The Medical Act 1858 marks the start of the modern period of medical regulation in the UK. The purpose of the Act was to create the body now known as the General Medical Council – then known as The General Council of Medical Education and Registration of the United Kingdom. Explaining its purpose, the act says "it is expedient that Persons requiring Medical Aid should be enabled to distinguish qualified from unqualified Practitioners".

The act created the position of Registrar of the General Medical Council – an office still in existence today – whose duty is to keep up-to-date records of those registered to practise medicine and to make them publicly available.

The Medical Act 1950 (14 Geo 6 c 29), championed by GMC Registrar Michael Heseltine, introduced disciplinary boards and a right of appeal to the General Medical Council. It formally renamed the council to the name that had informally been used for some time: the General Medical Council. It also introduced a compulsory year of training for doctors after their university qualification, a training position which has developed into the current Foundation House Officer role.

Summing up the act, The British Medical Journal wrote, "In future, the GMC will be possessed of wider powers, improved machinery, and a better status, all serving to ensure the continued and enhanced confidence of the profession and the public alike."

The Medical Act 1983 provides the current statutory basis for the General Medical Council's functions. The council is also bound by laws that implement a European directive on mutual recognition of professional qualifications from European Economic Area countries.
