= Michael Heseltine (civil servant) =

Assistant secretary for Health and Registrar of the General Medical Council

Michael Heseltine CB (/ˈhɛzəltaɪn/; 1886–1952) was a senior civil servant in the United Kingdom and later Registrar of the General Medical Council between 1933 and 1951.

== Early life ==
Born in 1886 in Norfolk, his father was Rev. Ernest Heseltine, and his uncle was John Postle Heseltine. He was educated at Winchester College and New College, Oxford, where he studied Mods and Greats (Latin and Greek). He wrote a translation of Petronius' Satyricon in 1913, though it was criticised by Stephen Gaselee, the Pepys Librarian at Magdalene College, Cambridge for despite having a "virile and attractive style", having a number of mistranslations from Latin.

== Career ==
=== Civil servant ===
Heseltine was appointed as an administrative civil servant in the Civil Service in 1909 and initially served in the Office of Works and the Home Office. In 1912, he was transferred to the new National Health Insurance Commission and he became known as one of the most able administrators, being awarded the C.B. in 1919 following the First World War. He was the secretary of the Machinery of Government Committee chaired by Viscount Haldane in 1917. He would later represent the Minister of Health on the Dental Board of the United Kingdom from 1928 to 1933. He was subsequently transferred to the new Ministry of Health in which he would serve until 1933.

=== General Medical Council ===
Heseltine joined the General Medical Council in 1933 as Registrar, also joining the Dental Board of the United Kingdom in the same role. He would remain in these positions until 1951 and 1946 respectively. Heseltine was praised for his role in passing the 1950 Medical Act which introduced disciplinary boards and compulsory training years for doctors. Lord Hacking paid tribute to him during the second reading in the House of Lords: for the great part which he played from the very commencement of the discussions until their successful completion some months ago.

=== Later life and death ===
After retiring from the post of registrar aged sixty-four, Heseltine continued to conduct research and write about the history of medical education for the General Medical Council and a post of Librarian was created especially for him. He died following a short illness on 13 March 1952, less than a year after his retirement.

== Honours ==
Companion of the Order of the Bath (CB)	1919
