= Francesco d'Antonio =

Italian painter

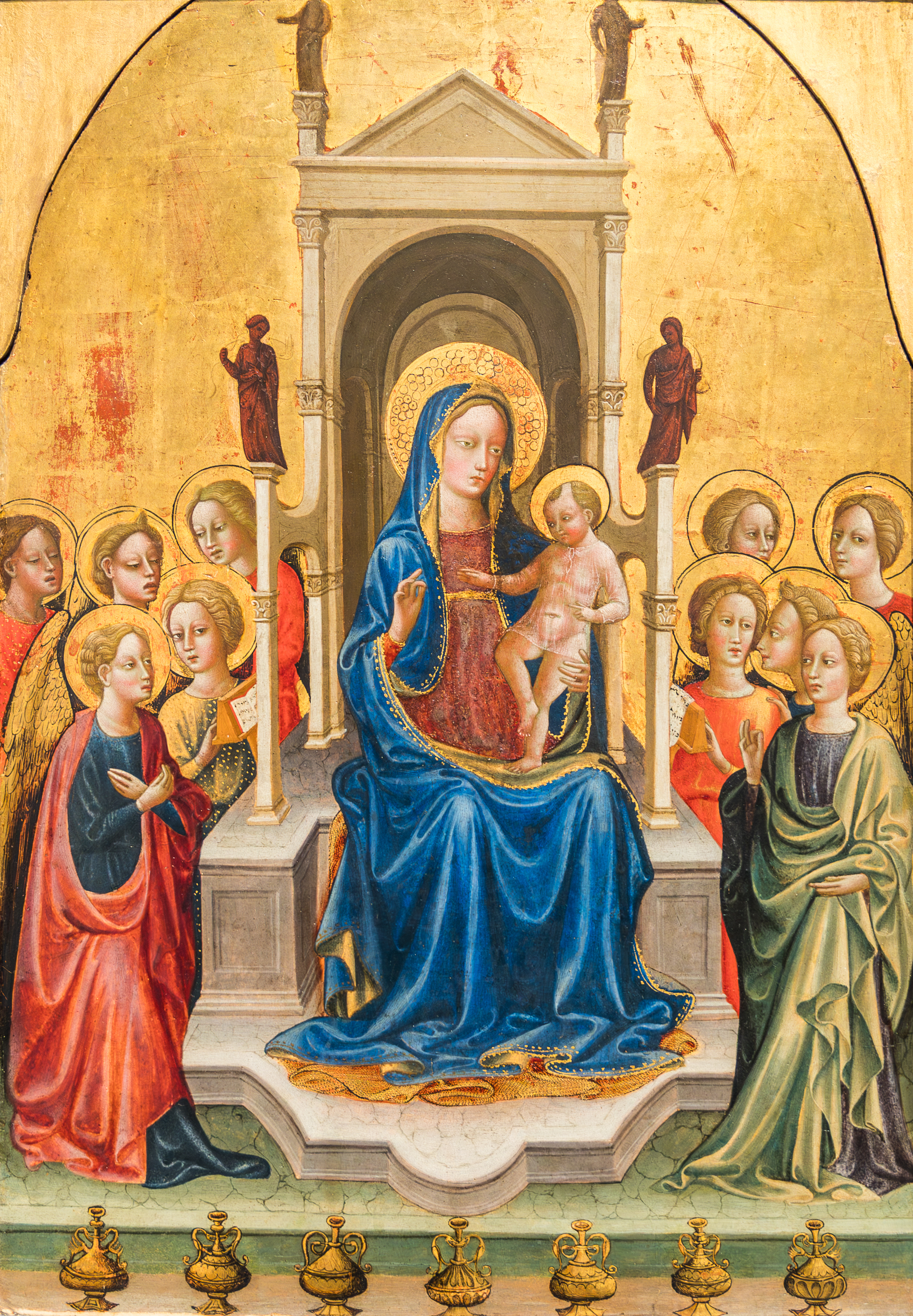
Enthroned Madonna and Child with Angels (1425), Wallraf–Richartz Museum, Cologne

Francesco d'Antonio or d'Antonio di Bartolomeo (born 1393, active until 1452) was an Italian Renaissance painter of the Renaissance, mainly active in Florence.

He is likely to be the same "Francesco Fiorentino" described in Vasari's Lives as a follower of Lorenzo Monaco. In 1429 Francesco joined the painters' guild in Florence. A signed triptych (c. 1415 – 1418) attributed to Francesco is found in the Fitzwilliam Museum, Cambridge. A painting of the Virgin and Child with Six Angels and Two Cherubim (c. 1440–1450) on a gilded background is in the National Gallery, London. A panel titled Madonna and Child with a Swallow (c. 1420–1425) attributed to the artist is found in the collection of the Denver Art Museum.
