= Anthonie van Borssom =

Dutch landscape painter (1631–1677)

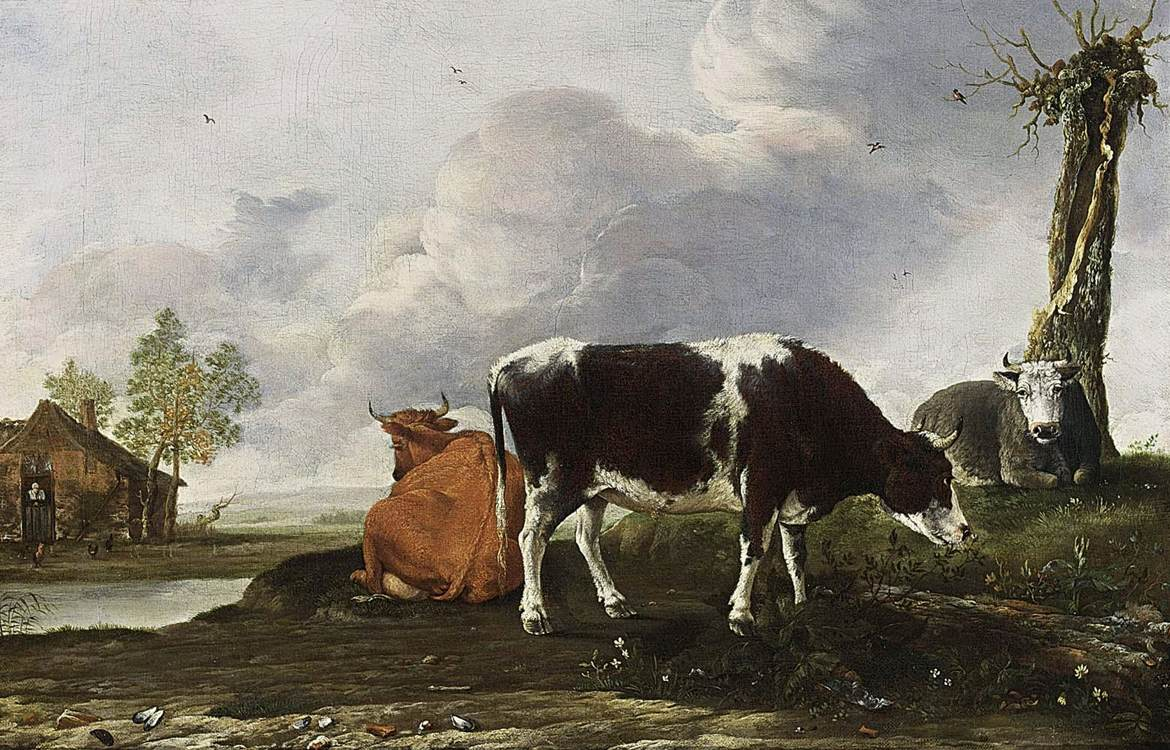
Landscape with Cows

Anthonie van Borssom (2 January 1631 – 19 March 1677) was a Dutch Golden Age landscape painter.

== Biography ==
According to the Netherlands Institute for Art History, he was an Italianate landscape painter who copied the works of popular landscape painters of his day in Amsterdam such as Jacob van Ruisdael, Paulus Potter, Aelbert Cuyp (church interiors), Nicolaes Berchem, Philips Koninck, Jan Wijnants, Aert van der Neer (moonlit landscapes), Marseus van Schrieck and Cornelis Vroom. He was probably a pupil of Rembrandt in the years 1645–1650.

Van Borssom was born in Amsterdam, and lived and worked in the city as an adult. He made a trip in 1650–1655 along the Rhine and spent time in Kleve. He was buried in the Westerkerk.
