= List of acts of the Parliament of Malaysia =

This is a list of acts of the Parliament of Malaysia. The list includes all principal acts enacted after 1969 and pre-1969 statutes that were revised by the Commissioner of Law Revision under the authority of the Revision of Laws Act 1968.

== List ==
Short title	Act number (citation)	Status	Link
Abattoirs (Privatization) Act 1993	507	In force	
Abduction and Criminal Intimidation of Witnesses Act 1947	191	In force	
Abolition of Mandatory Death Penalty Act 2023	846	In force	
Aboriginal Peoples Act 1954	134	In force	
Academy of Sciences Malaysia Act 1994	524	In force	
Access To Biological Resources and Benefit Sharing Act 2017	795	In force	
Accountants Act 1967	94	In force	
Administration of Islamic Law (Federal Territories) Act 1993	505	In force	
Adoption Act 1952	257	In force	
Age of Majority Act 1971	21	In force	
Agensi Inovasi Malaysia Act 2010	718	In force	
Airport and Aviation Services (Operating Company) Act 1991	467	In force	
Akademi Seni Budaya dan Warisan Kebangsaan Act 2006	653	In force	
Allied Health Professions Act 2016	774	In force	
Animal Welfare Act 2015	772	In force	
Animals Act 1953	647	In force	
Anti-Corruption Act 1997	575	Repealed by Act 694	
Anti-Corruption Agency Act 1982	271	Repealed by Act 575	
Anti-Fake News Act 2018	803	In force	
Anti-Fake News (Repeal) Act 2020	825	In force	
Anti-Money Laundering, Anti-Terrorism Financing and Proceeds of Unlawful Activities Act 2001	613	In force	
Anti-Personnel Mines Convention Implementation Act 2000	603	In force	
Anti-Trafficking in Persons and Anti-Smuggling of Migrants Act 2007	670	In force	
Antiquities Act 1976	168	Repealed by Act 645	
Arbitration Act 1952	93	Repealed by Act 646	
Arbitration Act 2005	646	In force	
Architects Act 1967	117	In force	
Armed Forces Act 1972	77	In force	
Arms Act 1960	206	In force	
Asian Development Bank Act 1966	462	In force	
Asian Infrastructure Investment Bank Act 2017	786	In force	
Assignment of Export Duty (Mineral Ores) Act 1964	396	In force	
Assignment of Revenue (Export Duty on Iron Ore) Act 1962	395	In force	
Atomic Energy Licensing Act 1984	304	In force	
Attestation of Registrable Instruments (Mining) Act 1960	387	In force	
Audit Act 1957	62	In force	
Aviation Offences Act 1984	307	In force	
Banishment Act 1959	79	Repealed by Act 735	
Banishment (Repeal) Act 2011	735	In force	
Bank Kerjasama Rakyat Malaysia Berhad (Special Provisions) Act 1978	202	In force	
Bank Pertanian Malaysia Act 1969	9	Repealed by Act 684	
Bank Pertanian Malaysia Berhad Act 2008	684	In force	
Bank Simpanan Nasional Act 1974	146	In force	
Bank Simpanan Nasional Berhad Act 1997	571	Not yet in force	
Bankers' Books (Evidence) Act 1949	33	In force	
Banking Act 1973	102	Repealed by Act 372	
Banking and Financial Institutions Act 1989	372	Repealed by Act 758	
Bankruptcy Act 1967	360	In force	
Baselines of Maritime Zones Act 2006	660	In force	
Bernama Act 1967	449	Superseded by Act 780	
BERNAMA Act 1967	780	In force	
Betting Act 1953	495	In force	
Betting and Sweepstake Duties Act 1948	201	In force	
Bills of Exchange Act 1949	204	In force	
Bills of Sale Act 1950	268	In force	
Bintulu Port Authority Act 1981	243	In force	
Bintulu Port Authority (Dissolution) Act 2024	859	Not yet in force	
Biosafety Act 2007	678	In force	
Biro Siasatan Negara Act 1973	123	Repealed by Act 271	
Births and Deaths Registration Act 1957	299	In force	
Bretton Woods Agreements Act 1957	472	In force	
Broadcasting Act 1988	338	Repealed by Act 588	
Building and Common Property (Maintenance and Management) Act 2007	663	Repealed by Act 757	
Capital Markets and Services Act 2007	671	In force	
Capitation Grant Act 1993	503	In force	
Capitation Grant Act 2002	622	In force	
Care Centres Act 1993	506	In force	
Carriage by Air Act 1974	148	In force	
Carriage of Goods by Sea Act 1950	527	In force	
Census Act 1960	16	In force	
Central Bank of Malaysia Act 1958	519	Repealed by Act 701	
Central Bank of Malaysia Act 2009	701	In force	
Chemicals Weapons Convention Act 2005	641	In force	
Chemists Act 1975	158	In force	
Cheng Hoon Teng Temple (Incorporation) Act 1949	517	In force	
Child Act 2001	611	In force	
Child Care Centre Act 1984	308	In force	
Child Protection Act 1991	468	Repealed by Act 611	
Children and Young Persons Act 1947	232	Repealed by Act 468	
Children and Young Persons (Employment) Act 1966	350	In force	
Cinematograph Film-Hire Duty Act 1965	434	Repealed by Act 557	
City of Kuala Lumpur Act 1971	59	In force	
City of Kuala Lumpur (Planning) Act 1973	107	Repealed by Act 267	
Civil Aviation Act 1969	3	In force	
Civil Aviation Authority of Malaysia Act 2017	788	In force	
Civil Defence Act 1951	221	In force	
Civil Law Act 1956	67	In force	
Civil List Act 1982	269	In force	
Co-operative College (Incorporation) Act 1968	437	In force	
Co-operative Societies Act 1948	287	Repealed by Act 502	
Co-operative Societies Act 1993	502	In force	
Coin (Import and Export) Act 1957	430	In force	
Commercial Vehicles Licensing Board Act 1987	334	In force	
Commissions of Enquiry Act 1950	119	In force	
Commodities Trading Act 1980	229	Repealed by Act 324	
Commodities Trading Act 1985	324	Repealed by Act A987	
Common Gaming Houses Act 1953	289	In force	
Communications and Multimedia Act 1998	588	In force	
Companies Act 1965	125	Repealed by Act 777	
Companies Act 2016	777	In force	
Companies Commission of Malaysia Act 2001	614	In force	
Competition Act 2010	712	In force	
Competition Commission Act 2010	713	In force	
Computer Crimes Act 1997	563	In force	
Construction Industry Payment and Adjudication Act 2012	746	In force	
Consular Relations (Vienna Convention) Act 1999	595	In force	
Consumer Protection Act 1999	599	In force	
Continental Shelf Act 1966	83	In force	
Contracts Act 1950	136	In force	
Control of Imported Publications Act 1958	63	Repealed by Act 301	
Control of Padi and Rice Act 1994	522	In force	
Control of Rent Act 1966	363	Repealed by Act 572	
Control of Rent (Repeal) Act 1997	572	In force	
Control Of Smoking Products For Public Health Act 2024	852	In force	
Control of Supplies Act 1961	122	In force	
Convention on the Recognition and Enforcement of Foreign Arbitral Awards Act 1985	320	Repealed by Act 646	
Convention on the Settlement of Investment Disputes Act 1966	392	In force	
Copyright Act 1969	10	Repealed by Act 332	
Copyright Act 1987	332	In force	
Corrosive and Explosive Substances and Offensive Weapons Act 1958	357	In force	
Counsellors Act 1998	580	In force	
Counterfeit Coin Act 1957	429	In force	
Countervailing and Anti-Dumping Duties Act 1993	504	In force	
Courts of Judicature Act 1964	91	In force	
Courts (Modes Of Commencement Of Civil Actions) Act 2017	790	In force	
Credit Reporting Agencies Act 2010	710	In force	
Criminal Justice Act 1953	345	In force	
Criminal Procedure Code	593	In force	
Currency Act 2020	827	In force	
Customs Act 1967	235	In force	
Customs (Dumping and Subsidies) Act 1959	361	Repealed by Act 504	
Cyber Security Act 2024	854	In force	https://www.nacsa.gov.my/legal.php
Dangerous Drugs Act 1952	234	In force	
Dangerous Drugs (Forfeiture of Property) Act 1988	340	In force	
Dangerous Drugs (Special Preventive Measures) Act 1985	316	In force	
Data Sharing Act 2025	864	Not yet in force	
Debtors Act 1957	256	In force	
Declaration of an Area in the Bintulu District to be a Federal Port Act 1979	217	In force	
Declaration of an Area in the Bintulu District to be a Federal Port (Repeal) Act 2024	858	Not yet in force	
Defamation Act 1957	286	In force	
Degrees and Diplomas Act 1962	379	In force	
Delegation of Powers Act 1956	358	In force	
Demutualisation (Kuala Lumpur Stock Exchange) Act 2003	632	In force	
Dental Act 1971	51	Repealed by Act 804	
Dental Act 2018	804	In force	
Deoxyribonucleic Acid (DNA) Identification Act 2009	699	In force	
Departure Levy Act 2019	813	In force	
Deposit of Library Material Act 1986	331	In force	
Destitute Persons Act 1977	183	In force	
Destruction of Disease-Bearing Insects Act 1975	154	In force	
Development Financial Institutions Act 2002	618	In force	
Development Funds Act 1966	406	In force	
Dewan Bahasa dan Pustaka Act 1959	213	In force	
Digital Signature Act 1997	562	In force	
Diplomatic and Consular Officers (Oaths and Fees) Act 1959	348	In force	
Diplomatic Privileges (Vienna Convention) Act 1966	636	In force	
Direct Sales and Anti-Pyramid Scheme Act 1993	500	In force	
Director General of Social Welfare (Incorporation) Act 1948	529	In force	
Distress Act 1951	255	In force	
Distribution Act 1958	300	In force	
Domestic Violence Act 1994	521	In force	
Drainage Works Act 1954	354	In force	
Drug Dependants (Treatment and Rehabilitation) Act 1983	283	In force	
East Coast Economic Region Development Council Act 2008	688	In force	
Education Act 1996	550	In force	
Educational Institutions (Discipline) Act 1976	174	In force	
Election Commission Act 1957	31	In force	
Election Offences Act 1954	5	In force	
Elections Act 1958	19	In force	
Electrical Inspectorate Act 1983	277	Repealed by Act 447	
Electricity Act 1949	116	Repealed by Act 447	
Electricity Supply Act 1990	447	In force	
Electricity Supply (Successor Company) Act 1990	448	In force	
Electronic Commerce Act 2006	658	In force	
Electronic Government Activities Act 2007	680	In force	
Emblem and Names (Prevention of Improper Use) 1963	414	In force	
Emergency (Essential Powers) Act 1964	691	Ceased to have effect on 15 May 1969 under P.U.(A)146/1969 - See Privy Council case Teh Cheng Poh v. Public Prosecutor	
Emergency (Essential Powers) Act 1979	216	Expired on 22 June 2012 - Article 150(7) of the Constitution	
Emergency Powers (Kelantan) Act 1977	192	Repealed by P.U.(A)46/1978	
Employees Provident Fund Act 1951	272	Repealed by Act 452	
Employees Provident Fund Act 1991	452	In force	
Employees' Social Security Act 1969	4	In force	
Employment Act 1955	265	In force	
Employment Information Act 1953	159	In force	
Employment Insurance System Act 2017	800	In force	
Employment (Restriction) Act 1968	353	In force	
Energy Commission Act 2001	610	In force	
Energy Efficiency And Conservation Act 2024	861	In force	
Enforcement Agency Integrity Commission Act 2009	700	In force	
Entertainment (Federal Territory of Kuala Lumpur) Act 1992	493	In force	
Entertainments Duty Act 1953	103	In force	
Environmental Quality Act 1974	127	In force	
Estate Hospital Assistants (Registration) Act 1965	435	In force	
Evidence Act 1950	56	In force	
Evidence of Child Witness Act 2007	676	In force	
Exchange Control Act 1953	17	Repealed by Act 758	
Excise Act 1976	176	In force	
Exclusive Economic Zone Act 1984	311	In force	
Explosives Act 1957	207	In force	
Extended Credit Act 1966	405	In force	
External Loans Act 1963	403	In force	
Extra-territorial Offences Act 1976	163	In force	
Extradition Act 1992	479	In force	
Factories and Machinery Act 1967	139	In force	
Farmers' Organization Act 1973	109	In force	
Farmers' Organization Authority Act 1973	110	In force	
Federal Agricultural Marketing Authority Act 1965	141	In force	
Federal Capital Act 1960	190	In force	
Federal Housing Act 1965	391	In force	
Federal Lands Commissioner Act 1957	349	In force	
Federal Roads Act 1959	376	In force	
Federal Roads (Private Management) Act 1984	306	In force	
Federal Territory (Financial Arrangement) Act 1982	266	In force	
Federal Territory (Planning) Act 1982	267	In force	
Federation Light Dues Act 1953	250	In force	
Feed Act 2009	698	In force	
Fees Act 1951	209	In force	
Fees (Department of Museum Malaysia) (Validation) Act 2014	760	In force	
Fees (Malaysian Meteorological Department) (Validation) Act 2011	722	In force	
Fees (Marine Parks Malaysia) (Validation) Act 2004	635	In force	
Fees (National Agriculture Training Council) (Validation) Act 2009	697	In force	
Fees (National Planetarium) (Validation) Act 1998	583	In force	
Film Censorship Act 2002	620	In force	
Films (Censorship) Act 1952	35	Repealed by Act 620	
Finance Act 1981	241	In force	
Finance Act 1982	264	In force	
Finance Act 1983	293	In force	
Finance Act 1984	309	In force	
Finance Act 1985	315	In force	
Finance Act 1986	328	In force	
Finance Act 1987	337	In force	
Finance Act 1988	364	In force	
Finance Act 1990	420	In force	
Finance Act 1991	451	In force	
Finance Act 1992	476	In force	
Finance Act 1993	497	In force	
Finance Act 1994	513	In force	
Finance Act 1995	531	In force	
Finance Act 1996	544	In force	
Finance Act 1997	557	In force	
Finance Act 1998	578	In force	
Finance Act 2000	600	In force	
Finance Act 2002	619	In force	
Finance Act 2003	631	In force	
Finance Act 2004	639	In force	
Finance Act 2005	644	In force	
Finance Act 2006	661	In force	
Finance Act 2007	683	In force	
Finance Act 2009	693	In force	
Finance Act 2010	702	In force	
Finance Act 2011	719	In force	
Finance Act 2012	742	In force	
Finance Act 2013	755	In force	
Finance Act 2014	761	In force	
Finance Act 2015	773	In force	
Finance Act 2017	785	In force	
Finance Act 2018	812	In force	
Finance Act 2019	823	In force	
Finance (Banking and Financial Institutions) Act 1986	330	In force	
Finance Companies Act 1969	6	Repealed by Act 372	
Finance (Estate Duty) Act 1971	38	Repealed by Act 476	
Finance (Estate Duty) Act 1979	219	Repealed by Act 476	
Finance (Estate Duty) Act 1980	224	Repealed by Act 476	
Finance (No. 2) Act 1982	274	In force	
Finance (No. 2) Act 1985	323	In force	
Finance (No. 2) Act 1986	329	In force	
Finance (No. 2) Act 1990	421	In force	
Finance (No. 2) Act 1998	591	In force	
Finance (No. 2) Act 2000	608	In force	
Finance (No. 2) Act 2002	624	In force	
Finance (No. 2) Act 2014	764	In force	
Finance (No. 2) Act 2017	801	In force	
Financial Procedure Act 1957	61	In force	
Financial Reporting Act 1997	558	In force	
Financial Services Act 2013	758	In force	
Fire Services Act 1988	341	In force	
Firearms (Increased Penalties) Act 1971	37	In force	
Fisheries Act 1963	210	Repealed by Act 317	
Fisheries Act 1985	317	In force	
Fishermen’s Associations Act 1971	44	In force	
Food Act 1983	281	In force	
Food Analysts Act 2011	727	In force	
Food Donors Protection Act 2020	826	In force	
Foreign Representatives (Privileges and Immunities) Act 1967	541	In force	
Forest Research Institute Malaysia Act 2016	782	In force	
Franchise Act 1998	590	In force	
Free Trade Zone Act 1971	24	Repealed by Act 438	
Free Zones Act 1990	438	In force	
Futures Industry Act 1993	499	Repealed by Act 671	
Gaming Tax Act 1972	65	In force	
Gas Supply Act 1993	501	In force	
Geneva Conventions Act 1962	512	In force	
Geographical Indications Act 2000	602	In force	
Geological Survey Act 1974	129	In force	
Geologists Act 2008	689	In force	
Girl Guides Act 1953	456	In force	
Good Shepherd Nuns (Incorporation) Act 1973	108	In force	
Goods and Services Tax Act 2014	762	Repealed by Act 805	
Goods Vehicle Levy Act 1983	294	In force	
Government Contracts Act 1949	120	In force	
Government Funding Act 1983	275	In force	
Government Loans (Notice of Trusts) Act 1947	649	In force	
Government Proceedings Act 1956	359	In force	
Government Trustee Securities Act 1957	426	In force	
Guardianship of Infants Act 1961	351	In force	
Highway Authority Malaysia (Incorporation) Act 1980	231	In force	
Hire-Purchase Act 1967	212	In force	
Hire Purchase Registration (Sarawak) (Repeal) Act 2007	677	In force	
Holidays Act 1951	369	In force	
Hotels (Federal Territory of Kuala Lumpur) Act 2003	626	In force	
House to House and Street Collections Act 1947	200	In force	
Houses of Parliament (Privileges and Powers) Act 1952	347	In force	
Housing Development (Control and Licensing) Act 1966	118	In force	
Housing Loans Fund Act 1971	42	In force	
Housing Trust Act 1950	18	Repealed by Act A339	
Human Resources Development Act 1992	491	Repealed by Act 612	
Human Rights Commission of Malaysia Act 1999	597	In force	
Human Tissues Act 1974	130	In force	
Hydrogen Cyanide (Fumigation) Act 1953	260	In force	
Immigration Act 1959/63	155	In force	
Import Duties (Validation) Act 1992	477	In force	
Income Tax Act 1967	53	In force	
Income Tax (Tin Buffer Stock Contributions and Repayments) Act 1974	132	In force	
Incorporation (State Legislatures Competency) Act 1962	380	In force	
Indecent Advertisements Act 1953	259	In force	
Industrial Co-ordination Act 1975	156	In force	
Industrial Designs Act 1996	552	In force	
Industrial Relations Act 1967	177	In force	
Inheritance (Family Provision) Act 1971	39	In force	
Inland Revenue Board of Malaysia Act 1995	533	In force	
Innkeepers Act 1952	248	In force	
Insurance Act 1963	89	Repealed by Act 553	
Insurance Act 1996	553	Repealed by Act 758	
Intellectual Property Corporation of Malaysia Act 2002	617	In force	
Interest Schemes Act 2016	778	In force	
Internal Security Act 1960	82	Repealed by Act 747	
International Development Association Act 1960	431	In force	
International Finance Corporation Act 1957	428	In force	
International Fund for Agricultural Development Act 1992	483	In force	
International Interests in Mobile Equipment (Aircraft) Act 2006	659	In force	
International Islamic Liquidity Management Corporation Act 2011	721	In force	
International Islamic Trade Finance Corporation Act 2007	669	In force	
International Monetary Fund (Ratification of Amendments to the Articles of Agreement) Act 1969	12	In force	
International Monetary Fund (Ratification of Second Amendment to the Articles of Agreement) Act 1977	184	In force	
International Organizations (Privileges and Immunities) Act 1992	485	In force	
International Trade in Endangered Species Act 2008	686	In force	
International Transfer of Prisoners Act 2012	754	In force	
Interpretation Acts 1948 and 1967	388	In force	
Investment Incentives Act 1968	199	Repealed by Act 327	
Irrigation Areas Act 1953	386	In force	
Iskandar Regional Development Authority Act 2007	664	In force	
Islamic Banking Act 1983	276	Repealed by Act 759	
Islamic Development Bank Act 1975	153	In force	
Islamic Family Law (Federal Territories) Act 1984	303	In force	
Islamic Financial Services Act 2013	759	In force	
Islamic Financial Services Board Act 2002	623	In force	
Istana Negara (Royal Allowances) Act 1982	270	In force	
Jasa Perkasa Persekutuan (Remembrance Allowance) Act 2012	744	In force	
Jewellers (Licensing) Act 1917	857	In force	
Joint Service (Islamic Affairs Officers) Act 1997	573	In force	
Judges' Ethics Committee Act 2010	703	In force	
Judges' Remuneration Act 1971	45	In force	
Judicial Appointments Commission Act 2009	695	In force	
Judicial Proceedings (Regulation of Reports) Act 1962	114	In force	
Jurisdictional Immunities Of Foreign States Act 2024	853	In force	
Juvenile Courts Act 1947	90	Repealed by Act 611	
Kampong Bharu Development Corporation Act 2011	733	In force	
Kedah and Penang (Alteration of Boundary) Act 1985	325	In force	
Kelantan Land Settlement Act 1955	460	In force	
Kemubu Agricultural Development Authority Act 1972	69	In force	
Kidnapping Act 1961	365	In force	
Kootu Funds (Prohibition) Act 1971	28	In force	
Kootu Funds (Validation) Act 1974	142	In force	
Labuan Business Activity Tax Act 1990	445	In force	
Labuan Companies Act 1990	441	In force	
Labuan Financial Services and Securities Act 2010	704	In force	
Labuan Foundations Act 2010	706	In force	
Labuan Islamic Financial Services and Securities Act 2010	705	In force	
Labuan Limited Partnerships and Limited Liability Partnerships Act 2010	707	In force	
Labuan Native Title Act 2007	667	In force	
Labuan Offshore Financial Services Authority Act 1996	545	In force	
Labuan Offshore Limited Partnerships Act 1997	565	Repealed by Act 707	
Labuan Offshore Securities Industry Act 1998	579	Repealed by Act 704	
Labuan Offshore Trusts Act 1996	554	In force	
Labuan Trust Companies Act 1990	442	Repealed by Act 704	
Land Acquisition Act 1960	486	In force	
Land and Mining Plans and Documents (Photographic Copies) Act 1950	233	In force	
Land Conservation Act 1960	385	In force	
Land Development Act 1956	474	In force	
Land (Group Settlement Areas) Act 1960	530	In force	
Land Public Transport Act 2010	715	In force	
Land Speculation Tax Act 1974	126	Repealed by Act 169	
Langkawi International Yacht Registry Act 2003	630	In force	
Langkawi International Yachting Companies Act 2005	643	Not yet in force	
Law Reform (Eradication of Illicit Samsu) Act 1976	165	In force	
Law Reform (Marriage and Divorce) Act 1976	164	In force	
Layout-Designs of Integrated Circuits Act 2000	601	In force	
Legal Aid Act 1971	26	In force	
Legal Profession Act 1976	166	In force	
Legislature of Sarawak (Application of Monies Borrowed from the Federation) Act 1968	779	In force	
Legitimacy Act 1961	60	In force	
Lembaga Akreditasi Negara Act 1996	556	Repealed by Act 679	
Lembaga Kemajuan Ikan Malaysia Act 1971	49	In force	
Lembaga Kemajuan Johor Tenggara Act 1972	75	In force	
Lembaga Kemajuan Johor Tenggara (Dissolution) Act 1997	568	In force	
Lembaga Kemajuan Kelantan Selatan Act 1978	203	In force	
Lembaga Kemajuan Pahang Tenggara Act 1972	68	Repealed by Act 569	
Lembaga Kemajuan Pahang Tenggara (Dissolution) Act 1997	569	In force	
Lembaga Kemajuan Perusahaan Haiwan Negara Act 1972	73	Repealed by Act 292	
Lembaga Kemajuan Terengganu Tengah Act 1973	104	In force	
Lembaga Kemajuan Ternakan Negara (Dissolution) Act 1983	292	In force	
Lembaga Kemajuan Wilayah Jengka Act 1983	285	Repealed by Act 567	
Lembaga Kemajuan Wilayah Jengka (Dissolution) Act 1997	567	In force	
Lembaga Kemajuan Wilayah Kedah Act 1981	249	In force	
Lembaga Kemajuan Wilayah Pulau Pinang Act 1983	282	In force	
Lembaga Letrik Sabah Act 1983	278	Repealed by P.U (A) 37/2008	
Lembaga Padi dan Beras Negara Act 1971	47	Repealed by Act 522	
Lembaga Padi dan Beras Negara (Successor Company) Act 1994	523	In force	
Lembaga Pembangunan Industri Pembinaan Malaysia Act 1994	520	In force	
Lembaga Pembangunan Labuan Act 1992	480	Repealed by Act 609	
Lembaga Pembangunan Langkawi Act 1990	423	In force	
Lembaga Urusan dan Tabung Haji Act 1969	8	Repealed by Act 535	
Licensed Land Surveyors Act 1958	458	In force	
Limitation Act 1953	254	In force	
Limited Liability Partnerships Act 2012	743	In force	
Loan Guarantee Act 1958	412	In force	
Loan Guarantee Act 1972	66	In force	
Loan (International Tin Buffer Stock) Act 1971	41	In force	
Loan (Local) Act 1957	648	In force	
Loan (Local) Act 1959	637	In force	
Loan (Local) Act 1961	650	In force	
Loans (Asian Development Bank) Act 1968	410	In force	
Loans (Central Bank of Malaysia) Act 1960	459	In force	
Loans Guarantee (Bodies Corporate) Act 1965	96	In force	
Loans (International Bank) Act 1958	411	In force	
Loans (International Fund for Agricultural Development) Act 1992	484	In force	
Loans (Islamic Development Bank) Act 1977	187	In force	
Local Authorities (Conditions of Service) Act 1964	798	In force	
Local Government Act 1976	171	In force	
Local Government Elections Act 1960	473	In force	
Local Government (Temporary Provisions) Act 1973	124	Repealed by Act 171	
Lotteries Act 1952	288	In force	
Maintenance Orders (Facilities for Enforcement) Act 1949	34	In force	
Majlis Amanah Rakyat Act 1966	489	In force	
Malaria Eradication Act 1971	52	Repealed by Act 342	
Malayan Railway Provident Fund (Dissolution) Act 1995	534	In force	
Malaysia Co-operative Societies Commission Act 2007	665	In force	
Malaysia Border Control And Protection Agency Act 2024	860	In force	
Malaysia Deposit Insurance Corporation Act 2005	642	Repealed by Act 720	
Malaysia Deposit Insurance Corporation Act 2011	720	In force	
Malaysia External Trade Development Corporation Act 1992	490	In force	
Malaysia Productivity Corporation (Incorporation) Act 1966	408	In force	
Malaysia Tourism Promotion Board Act 1992	481	In force	
Malaysia Volunteers Corps Act 2012	752	In force	
Malaysia-Thailand Joint Authority Act 1990	440	In force	
Malaysian Agricultural Research and Development Institute Act 1969	11	In force	
Malaysian Airline System Berhad (Administration) Act 2015	765	In force	
Malaysian Anti-Corruption Commission Act 2009	694	In force	
Malaysian Aviation Commission Act 2015	771	Repealed by Act 856	
Malaysian Aviation Commission (Dissolution) Act 2024	856	In force	
Malaysian Biofuel Industry Act 2007	666	In force	
Malaysian Border Security Agency Act 2017	799	In force	
Malaysian Chamber of Mines Incorporation Act 1914	367	In force	
Malaysian Cocoa Board (Incorporation) Act 1988	343	In force	
Malaysian Combined Cadet Force Act 1967	417	In force	
Malaysian Communications and Multimedia Commission Act 1998	589	In force	
Malaysian Currency (Ringgit) Act 1975	160	In force	
Malaysian Examinations Council Act 1980	225	In force	
Malaysian Forestry Research and Development Board Act 1985	319	In force	
Malaysian Health Promotion Board Act 2006	651	In force	
Malaysian Health Promotion Board (Dissolution) Act 2019	824	In force	
Malaysian Industrial Development Authority (Incorporation) Act 1965	397	In force	
Malaysian Institute of Road Safety Research Act 2012	748	In force	
Malaysian Maritime Enforcement Agency Act 2004	633	In force	
Malaysian Palm Oil Board Act 1998	582	In force	
Malaysian Pepper Board Act 2006	656	In force	
Malaysian Qualifications Agency Act 2007	679	In force	
Malaysian Quarantine and Inspection Services Act 2011	728	In force	
Malaysian Red Crescent Society (Incorporation) Act 1965	540	In force	
Malaysian Red Cross Society (Change of Name) Act 1975	162	In force	
Malaysian Rubber Board (Incorporation) Act 1996	551	In force	
Malaysian Rubber Exchange and Licensing Board Act 1972	84	Repealed by Act 551	
Malaysian Rubber Exchange (Incorporation) Act 1962	402	In force	
Malaysian Rubber Research and Development Fund Act 1958	401	Repealed by Act 551	
Malaysian Standard Time Act 1981	261	In force	
Malaysian Timber Industry Board (Incorporation) Act 1973	105	In force	
Married Woman Act 1957	450	In force	
Married Women and Children (Enforcement of Maintenance) Act 1968	356	In force	
Married Women and Children (Enforcement of Maintenance) Act 1968	794	In force	
Married Women and Children (Maintenance) Act 1950	263	In force	
Martial Arts Societies Act 1976	170	In force	
Mediation Act 2012	749	In force	
Medical Act 1971	50	In force	
Medical Assistants (Registration) Act 1977	180	In force	
Medical Device Act 2012	737	In force	
Medical Device Authority Act 2012	738	In force	
Medicines (Advertisement and Sale) Act 1956	290	In force	
Members of the Administration and Members of Parliament (Pensions and Gratuities) Act 1971	23	Repealed by Act 237	
Members of Parliament (Remuneration) Act 1980	237	In force	
Mental Health Act 2001	615	In force	
Merchant Shipping (Oil Pollution) Act 1994	515	In force	
Merdeka Stadium Corporation Act 1963	433	Repealed by Act 717	
Methodist Church In Malaysia Act 1955	457	In force	
Metric Weights and Measures Act 1971	40	Repealed by Act 71	
Midwives Act 1966	436	In force	
Military Manoeuvres Act 1983	295	In force	
Mineral Development Act 1994	525	In force	
Minimum Retirement Age Act 2012	753	In force	
Minister of Finance (Incorporation) Act 1957	375	In force	
Ministerial Functions Act 1969	2	In force	
Minor Offences Act 1955	336	In force	
Money-Changing Act 1998	577	Repealed by Act 731	
Money Services Business Act 2011	731	In force	
Moneylenders Act 1951	400	In force	
Muda Agricultural Development Authority Act 1972	70	In force	
Mutual Assistance in Criminal Matters Act 2002	621	In force	
National Anthem Act 1968	390	In force	
National Anthem Act 1968	808	In force	
National Anti-Drugs Agency Act 2004	638	In force	
National Anti-Financial Crime Centre Act 2019	822	In force	
National Archives Act 1966	511	Repealed by Act 629	
National Archives Act 2003	629	In force	
National Art Gallery Act 1959	516	Repealed by Act 724	
National Association Of Women’s Institutes Of Malaysia Incorporation Act 1958	510	In force	
National Council on Higher Education Act 1996	546	In force	
National Defence Fund (Dissolution and Transfer) Act 1984	305	In force	
National Emblems (Control of Display) Act 1949	193	In force	
National Forestry Act 1984	313	In force	
National Heritage Act 2005	645	In force	
National Institute for Scientific and Industrial Research (Incorporation) Act 1971	48	Repealed by Act 157	
National Kenaf and Tobacco Board Act 2009	692	In force	
National Land Code	828	In force	
National Land Code (Penang And Malacca Titles) Act 1963	518	In force	
National Land Code (Validation) Act 2003	625	In force	
National Land Rehabilitation and Consolidation Authority (Incorporation) Act 1966	398	Repealed by Act 570	
National Land Rehabilitation and Consolidation Authority (Succession and Dissolution) Act 1997	570	In force	
National Language Act 1963/67	32	In force	
National Library Act 1972	80	In force	
National Measurement System Act 2007	675	In force	
National Parks Act 1980	226	In force	
National Registration Act 1959	78	In force	
National Security Council Act 2016	776	In force	
National Service Act 1952	425	In force	
National Service Training Act 2003	628	In force	
National Skills Development Act 2006	652	In force	
National Sports Council of Malaysia Act 1971	29	In force	
National Sports Institute Act 2011	729	In force	
National Tobacco Board (Incorporation) Act 1973	111	Repealed by Act 692	
National Trust Fund Act 1988	339	In force	
National Visual Arts Development Board Act 2011	724	In force	
National Wages Consultative Council Act 2011	732	In force	
Native Courts (Criminal Jurisdiction) Act 1991	471	In force	
Netting of Financial Agreements Act 2015	766	In force	
Northern Corridor Implementation Authority Act 2008	687	In force	
Notaries Public Act 1959	115	In force	
Nurses Act 1950	14	In force	
Oaths and Affirmations Act 1949	194	In force	
Occupational Safety and Health Act 1994	514	In force	
Offences Relating to Awards 2017	787	In force	
Offenders Compulsory Attendance Act 1954	461	In force	
Official Secrets Act 1972	88	In force	
Offshore Banking Act 1990	443	Repealed by Act 704	
Offshore Insurance Act 1990	444	Repealed by Act 704	
Optical Act 1991	469	In force	
Optical Discs Act 2000	606	In force	
Padi Cultivators (Control of Rent and Security of Tenure) Act 1967	528	In force	
Padi Cultivators (Control of Rent and Security of Tenure) Act 1967	793	In force	
Palm Oil Registration and Licensing Authority (Incorporation) Act 1976	179	Repealed by Act 582	
Palm Oil Research and Development Act 1979	218	Repealed by Act 582	
Panglima Gagah Berani (Remembrance Allowance) Act 2001	616	In force	
Parliamentary Services Act 1963	394	Repealed by Act A837	
Partnership Act 1961	135	In force	
Passports Act 1966	150	In force	
Patents Act 1983	291	In force	
Pathology Laboratory Act 2007	674	Not yet in force	
Pawnbrokers Act 1972	81	In force	
Payment Systems Act 2003	627	Repealed by Act 758	
Peaceful Assembly Act 2012	736	In force	
Pembangunan Sumber Manusia Berhad Act 2001	612	In force	
Penal Code	574	In force	
Penang and Province Wellesley Jubilee Fund Act 1965	821	In force	
Penang Port Commission Act 1955	140	In force	
Pengurusan Danaharta Nasional Berhad Act 1998	587	In force	
Pensions Act 1980	227	In force	
Pensions Adjustment Act 1980	238	In force	
Pensions Re-computation Act 1980	228	In force	
Pensions Trust Fund Act 1991	454	Repealed by Act 662	
Perbadanan Kemajuan Filem Nasional Malaysia Act 1981	244	In force	
Perbadanan Kemajuan Kraftangan Malaysia Act 1979	222	In force	
Perbadanan Labuan Act 2001	609	In force	
Perbadanan Pembangunan Bandar Act 1971	46	Repealed by Act 547	
Perbadanan Pembangunan Bandar (Dissolution) Act 1996	547	In force	
Perbadanan Pembangunan Bandar (Successor Company) Act 1996	548	In force	
Perbadanan Pembekalan Letrik Sarawak Act 1983	279	Not yet in force	
Perbadanan Putrajaya Act 1995	536	In force	
Perbadanan Stadium Malaysia Act 2010	717	In force	
Perbadanan Tabung Pendidikan Tinggi Nasional Act 1997	566	In force	
Personal Data Protection Act 2010	709	In force	
Persons with Disabilities Act 2008	685	In force	
Perumahan Rakyat 1Malaysia Act 2012	739	In force	
Pesticides Act 1974	149	In force	
Petroleum and Electricity (Control of Supplies) Act 1974	128	In force	
Petroleum Development Act 1974	144	In force	
Petroleum (Income Tax) Act 1967	543	In force	
Petroleum Mining Act 1966	95	In force	
Petroleum (Safety Measures) Act 1984	302	In force	
Pineapple Industry Act 1957	427	In force	
Pingat Tentera Udara (Remembrance Allowance) Act 2012	745	In force	
Plant Quarantine Act 1976	167	In force	
Planters' Loans Fund (Dissolution) Act 1981	251	In force	
Poisons Act 1952	366	In force	
Police Act 1967	344	In force	
Politeknik Ungku Omar Act 1974	145	In force	
Pool Betting Act 1967	384	In force	
Pool Betting Act 1967	809	In force	
Population and Family Development Act 1966	352	In force	
Port Authorities Act 1963	488	In force	
Port Workers (Regulation of Employment) Act 1965	419	Repealed by Act 607	
Port Workers (Regulation of Employment) (Dissolution) Act 2000	607	In force	
Ports (Privatization) Act 1990	422	In force	
Post Office Act 1947	211	Repealed by Act 465	
Post Office Savings Bank Act 1948	113	Repealed by Act 146	
Postal Services Act 1991	465	Repealed by Act 741	
Postal Services Act 2012	741	In force	
Postal Services (Successor Company) Act 1991	466	In force	
Powers of Attorney Act 1949	424	In force	
Preservation of Public Security (Sarawak) Act 1962	855	In force	
Presumption of Survivorship Act 1950	205	In force	
Prevention and Control of Infectious Diseases Act 1988	342	In force	
Prevention of Corruption Act 1961	57	Repealed by Act 575	
Prevention of Crime Act 1959	297	In force	
Prevention of Terrorism Act 2015	769	In force	
Price Control Act 1946	121	In force	
Price Control and Anti-Profiteering Act 2011	723	In force	
Printing of Qur’anic Texts Act 1986	326	In force	
Printing Presses Act 1948	58	Repealed by Act 301	
Printing Presses and Publications Act 1984	301	In force	
Prison Act 1995	537	In force	
Private Aged Healthcare Facilities and Services Act 2018	802	Not yet in force	
Private Agencies Act 1971	27	In force	
Private Employment Agencies Act 1981	246	In force	
Private Healthcare Facilities and Services Act 1998	586	In force	
Private Higher Educational Institutions Act 1996	555	In force	
Private Hospitals Act 1971	43	Repealed by Act 586	
Probate and Administration Act 1959	97	In force	
Promotion of Investments Act 1986	327	In force	
Protected Areas and Protected Places Act 1959	298	In force	
Protection of New Plant Varieties Act 2004	634	In force	
Protection of Wild Life Act 1972	76	Repealed by Act 716	
Public Authorities (Control of Borrowing Powers) Act 1961	383	In force	
Public Authorities Protection Act 1948	198	In force	
Public Order (Preservation) Act 1958	296	In force	
Public Sector Home Financing Board Act 2015	767	In force	
Public Service Tribunal Act 1977	186	Repealed by Act 604	
Public Service Tribunal (Dissolution) Act 2000	604	In force	
Public Trust Corporation Act 1995	532	In force	
Public Trustee Act 1950	247	Repealed by Act 532	
Quantity Surveyors Act 1967	487	In force	
Racing Club (Public Sweepstakes) Act 1965	404	In force	
Racing (Totalizator Board) Act 1961	494	In force	
Railways Act 1991	463	In force	
Railways (Successor Company) Act 1991	464	In force	
Raja-Raja and the Yang di-Pertua-Yang di-Pertua Negeri Higher Studies Scholarship Fund Act 1983	284	In force	
Real Property Gains Tax Act 1976	169	In force	
Reciprocal Enforcement of Judgments Act 1958	99	In force	
Redemptorist Fathers (Incorporation) Act 1962	781	In force	
Registration of Adoptions Act 1952	253	In force	
Registration of Births and Deaths (Special Provisions) Act 1975	152	In force	
Registration of Businesses Act 1956	197	In force	
Registration of Criminals and Undesirable Persons Act 1969	7	In force	
Registration of Engineers Act 1967	138	In force	
Registration of Guests Act 1965	381	In force	
Registration of Pharmacists Act 1951	371	In force	
Registration of United Kingdom Patents Act 1951	215	Repealed by Act 291	
Renewable Energy Act 2011	725	In force	
Restricted Residence Act 1933	377	Repealed by Act 734	
Restricted Residence (Repeal) Act 2011	734	In force	
Retirement Fund Act 2007	662	In force	
Revenue Growth Grants Act 1977	181	In force	
Revision of Laws Act 1968	1	In force	
Revocation of Exemption from Payment of Stamp Duties Act 1992	478	In force	
Road Transport Act 1987	333	In force	
Roman Catholic Bishops (Change of Name and Incorporation) Act 1974	131	Repealed by Act 492	
Roman Catholic Bishops (Incorporation) Act 1957	492	In force	
Rubber Export Registration Act 1966	475	Repealed by Act 551	
Rubber Industry Smallholders Development Authority Act 1972	85	In force	
Rubber Price Stabilization Act 1975	161	In force	
Rubber Research Institute of Malaysia Act 1966	407	Repealed by Act 551	
Rubber Shipping and Packing Control Act 1949	526	Repealed by Act 551	
Rubber Statutory Bodies Act 1985	321	In force	
Rukun Tetangga Act 2012	751	In force	
Sabah Ports Authority (Consequential Provisions) Act 1968	797	In force	
Safeguards Act 2006	657	In force	
Sale of Drugs Act 1952	368	In force	
Sale of Goods Act 1957	382	In force	
Sales Tax Act 1972	64	Repealed by Act 762	
Sales Tax Act 2018	806	In force	
Salvation Army (Incorporated) Act 1956	690	In force	
Scouts Association of Malaysia Act 1974	143	In force	
Scouts Association of Malaysia (Incorporation) Act 1968	409	Superseded by Act 784	
Scouts Association of Malaysia (Incorporation) Act 1968	784	In force	
Second-Hand Dealers Act 1946	189	In force	
Securities Commission Act 1993	498	In force	
Securities Industry Act 1973	112	Repealed by Act 280	
Securities Industry Act 1983	280	Repealed by Act 671	
Securities Industry (Central Depositories) Act 1991	453	In force	
Security Offences (Special Measures) Act 2012	747	In force	
Sedition Act 1948	15	In force	
Self-Employment Social Security Act 2017	789	In force	
Seri Pahlawan Gagah Perkasa (Remembrance Allowance) Act 1990	439	In force	
Service Commissions Act 1957	393	In force	
Service Lands Act 1963	413	In force	
Service Tax Act 1975	151	Repealed by Act 762	
Services Tax Act 2018	807	In force	
Sewerage Services Act 1993	508	In force in Kuala Lumpur, Sabah and Sarawak, repealed by Act 655 elsewhere	
Sexual Offences Against Children Act 2017	792	In force	
Share (Land Based Company) Transfer Tax Act 1984	310	Repealed by Act 364	
Skills Development Fund Act 2004	640	In force	
Small and Medium Industries Development Corporation Act 1995	539	In force	
Small Estates (Distribution) Act 1955	98	In force	
Social and Welfare Services Lotteries Board Act 1950–1962	252	Repealed by Act 470	
Social and Welfare Services Lotteries Board (Dissolution) Act 1991	470	In force	
Societies Act 1966	335	In force	
Solid Waste and Public Cleansing Management Act 2007	672	In force	
Solid Waste and Public Cleansing Management Corporation Act 2007	673	In force	
South Indian Labour Fund Act 1958	496	Repealed by Act 596	
South Indian Labour Fund (Dissolution) Act 1999	596	In force	
Special Measures Against Terrorism in Foreign Countries Act 2015	770	In force	
Special Pensions (Raja Permaisuri Agong) Act 1979	223	Repealed by Act 270	
Specific Relief Act 1950	137	In force	
Sports Development Act 1997	576	In force	
St. John Ambulance of Malaysia (Incorporation) Act 1972	74	In force	
Stamp Act 1949	378	In force	
Standards and Industrial Research Institute of Malaysia (Incorporation) Act 1975	157	Repealed by Act 549	
Standards of Malaysia Act 1996	549	In force	
State Grants (Maintenance of Local Authorities) Act 1981	245	In force	
State Water Supply Fund (Financial and Accounting Procedure) Act 1980	230	In force	
Statistics Act 1965	415	In force	
Statutory and Local Authorities Pensions Act 1980	239	In force	
Statutory and Local Authorities Superannuation Fund Act 1977	185	In force	
Statutory Bodies (Accounts and Annual Reports) Act 1980	240	In force	
Statutory Bodies (Discipline and Surcharge) Act 2000	605	In force	
Statutory Bodies (Power to Borrow) Act 1999	598	In force	
Statutory Declarations Act 1960	13	Superseded by Act 783	
Statutory Declarations Act 1960	783	In force	
Strata Management Act 2013	757	In force	
Strata Titles Act 1985	318	In force	
Strategic Trade Act 2010	708	In force	
Street, Drainage and Building Act 1974	133	In force	
Subang Golf Course Corporation Act 1968	509	In force	
Subang Golf Course Corporation Act 1968	810	In force	
Subordinate Courts Act 1948	92	In force	
Subordinate Courts Rules Act 1955	55	In force	
Summonses and Warrants (Special Provisions) Act 1971	25	In force	
Superior of the Institute of the Congregation of the Brothers of Mercy (Incorporation) Act 1972	86	In force	
Supplementary Income Tax Act 1967	54	Repealed by Act 497	
Suruhanjaya Pengangkutan Awam Darat Act 2010	714	In force	
Suruhanjaya Pengangkutan Awam Darat (Dissolution) Act 2018	811	In force	
Suruhanjaya Perkhidmatan Air Negara Act 2006	654	In force	
Sustainable Energy Development Authority Act 2011	726	In force	
Syariah Court Civil Procedure (Federal Territories) Act 1998	585	In force	
Syariah Court Evidence (Federal Territories) Act 1997	561	In force	
Syariah Courts (Criminal Jurisdiction) Act 1965	355	In force	
Syariah Criminal Offences (Federal Territories) Act 1997	559	In force	
Syariah Criminal Procedure (Federal Territories) Act 1997	560	In force	
Syarie Legal Profession (Federal Territories) Act 2019	814	In force	
Synod of the Diocese of West Malaysia (Incorporation) Act 1971	36	In force	
Tabung Angkatan Tentera Act 1973	101	In force	
Tabung Haji Act 1995	535	In force	
Takaful Act 1984	312	Repealed by Act 759	
Teachers' Superannuation Fund (Sabah) (Dissolution) Act 1998	584	In force	
Technologists and Technicians Act 2015	768	In force	
Telecommunication Services (Successor Company) Act 1985	322	In force	
Telecommunications Act 1950	20	Repealed by Act 588	
Telemedicine Act 1997	564	Not yet in force	
Temporary Measures For Government Financing (Coronavirus Disease 2019 (Covid-19)) Act 2020	830	Repealed as of 1 January 2023	
Temporary Measures For Reducing The Impact Of Coronavirus Disease 2019 (Covid-19) Act 2020	829	Repealed as of 23 October 2022	
Territorial Sea Act 2012	750	In force	
The Daughters of Charity of the Canossian Institute (Incorporation) Act 1957	819	In force	
The Lady Superior of the Society of Saint Maur (Incorporation) Act 1955	817	In force	
The Overseas Missionary Fellowship (Incorporation) Act 1957	818	In force	
The Superior of the Institute of the Franciscan Missionaries of Mary (Incorporation) Act 1957	820	In force	
The Visitor in the Federation of Malaya of the Christian Brothers' Schools (Incorporation) Act 1954	816	In force	
Theatres and Places of Public Amusement (Federal Territory) Act 1977	182	Repealed by Act 493	
Timbalan Yang di-Pertuan Agong (Remuneration) Act 1958	374	In force	
Tin Control Act 1954	362	In force	
Tin Industry (Research and Development) Fund Act 1953	455	In force	
Titles of Office Act 1949	399	In force	
Tolls (Roads and Bridges) Act 1965	416	In force	
Tourism Industry Act 1992	482	In force	
Tourism Tax Act 2017	791	In force	
Tourism Vehicles Licensing Act 1999	594	In force	
Tourist Development Corporation of Malaysia Act 1972	72	Repealed by Act 481	
Town and Country Planning Act 1976	172	In force	
Town Planners Act 1995	538	In force	
Trade Descriptions Act 1972	87	Repealed by Act 730	
Trade Descriptions Act 2011	730	In force	
Trade Marks Act 1976	175	Repealed by Act 815	
Trade Unions Act 1959	262	In force	
Trademarks Act 2019	815	In force	
Traditional and Complementary Medicine Act 2013	756	Not in force, violates article 66(3) of the Constitution	
Traditional and Complementary Medicine Act 2016	775	In force	
Treasure Trove Act 1957	542	Repealed by Act 645	
Treasury Bills (Local) Act 1946	188	In force	
Treasury Deposit Receipts Act 1952	236	In force	
Trust Companies Act 1949	100	In force	
Trustee Act 1949	208	In force	
Trustees (Incorporation) Act 1952	258	In force	
Trusts (State Legislatures Competency) Act 1949	196	In force	
Tun Razak Foundation Act 1976	178	In force	
Tunku Abdul Rahman Foundation Fund Act 1966	389	In force	
Tunku Abdul Rahman Putra Al-Haj Pension Act 1971	22	In force	
Unclaimed Moneys Act 1965	370	In force	
United Kingdom Designs (Protection) Act 1949	214	Repealed by Act 552	
Universiti Teknologi MARA Act 1976	173	In force	
Universities and University Colleges Act 1971	30	In force	
University of Malaya Act 1961	682	In force	
Valuers, Appraisers and Estate Agents Act 1981	242	In force	
Veterans Act 2012	740	In force	
Veterinary Surgeons Act 1974	147	In force	
Visiting Forces Act 1960	432	In force	
Wages Councils Act 1947	195	Repealed by Act 732	
Water Services Industry Act 2006	655	In force	
Water Supply (Federal Territory of Kuala Lumpur) Act 1998	581	In force	
Waters Act 1920	418	In force	
Weekly Holidays Act 1950	220	In force	
Weights and Measures Act 1972	71	In force	
Whistleblower Protection Act 2010	711	In force	
Widows and Orphans Pension Act 1915	681	In force	
Wildlife Conservation Act 2010	716	In force	
Wills Act 1959	346	In force	
Windfall Profit Levy Act 1998	592	In force	
Witness Protection Act 2009	696	In force	
Women and Girls Protection Act 1973	106	Repealed by Act 611	
Wood-based Industries (State Legislatures Competency) Act 1984	314	In force	
Workers' Minimum Standards of The Housing and Amenities Act 1990	446	In force	
Workmen’s Compensation Act 1952	273	In force	
Yang di-Pertuan Agong (Exercise of Functions) Act 1957	373	In force	
Yayasan Guru Tun Hussein Onn Act 2014	763	In force	
Youth Societies and Youth Development Act 2007	668	In force	

== See also ==
- List of acts of the Parliament of Malaysia by citation number
