= Global Ikhwan child abuse scandal =

Child abuse scandal involving Global Ikhwan

Op Global
- One of the children's homes raided by PDRM on 11 September.
- Date: 11 September 2024 – ongoing
- Location: Malaysia
- Type: Child exploitation, human trafficking, sexual abuse
- Motive: Alleged child exploitation and sexual assault
- Target: Children at GISB welfare homes
- Perpetrator: GISB Holdings Sdn Bhd
- Inquiries: AMLA, ATIPSOM, SOACA and SOSMA
- Arrests: 415
- Rescued: 625
- Coordinating agencies: Royal Malaysia Police; Department of Islamic Development Malaysia; Department of Social Welfare

On 11 September 2024, the Royal Malaysia Police (PDRM) initiated Operation Global (Op Global; Malay: Operasi Global) to investigate reports of child neglect and sexual abuse at children's homes associated with Global Ikhwan Services and Business Holdings (GISB Holdings Sdn Bhd). Throughout the investigation, police rescued a total of 625 victims, aged between two and 28 years. As of 23 October 2024, 415 arrests have been made, with 60 individuals detained under SOSMA.

== Background ==
GISB Holdings Sdn Bhd (GISB) is a conglomerate reportedly holding assets valued at RM325 million, with business operations spanning 20 countries. The company was founded in 1997 by the remaining followers of Ashaari Muhammad, who also established Al-Arqam in 1968. It was formed three years after the Malaysian government banned al-Arqam in 1994 over concerns regarding its teachings. Initially operating as Rufaqa' Corporation, the company changed its name to Global Ikhwan following the ban on Rufaqa', and adopted its current name in 2010. According to the company's chief executive officer, the group was cleared of any legal wrongdoing by the police Special Branch.

GISB claims to employ 3,658 youth and 1,698 adults across its various businesses. However, it has faced allegations of using child labour by having minors sell goods through its business network, a claim the company denies.

== Timeline ==
Condition of the raided children's home taken by involved police officers.

=== Raid on children's homes ===
On 11 September 2024, a police report triggered a PDRM raid on 20 children's homes associated with GISB around Selangor and Negeri Sembilan. The initial toll of children rescued was 402, in which was 201 boys and 201 girls aged between one and 17 years old, in addition 171 suspects including teachers and wardens were remanded. The children were believed to be the offspring of GISB members currently stationed at GISB premises abroad. According to the Inspector-General of Police (IGP), some of the 402 children were allegedly sodomised and taught to sexually assault their peers. Health screenings conducted on 384 of the rescued children reportedly revealed physical injuries and signs of sexual abuse, with 13 cases of suspected sodomy. All of the rescued children were brought to PULAPOL for documentation. Out of 402 children, 10 who were disabled and autistic were handed over to the Department of Social Welfare. The total number of victims rescued during the operation reached 625, aged between two and 28. Of these, 553 were placed in 13 shelter homes, while 72 were returned to their families.

According to the police, from 2011 until September 2024, they had received 41 police reports against GISB, they also addressed allegations that the police reacted late on the information stating that the police were compiling information. The IGP also said 159 individuals out of the 171 suspects detained during the operation were remanded while the rest are minors and no need to be investigated. On 17 September 2024, the police later froze 96 bank accounts held by GISB with a total of RM581,552 under the Anti-Money Laundering, Anti-Terrorism Financing and Proceeds of Unlawful Activities Act 2001 (AMLA).

=== GISB's response ===
==== First press release ====
The day after the police raid, GISB issued a press release on Facebook, denying allegations of sodomy in the children's homes. Adib Attamimi, the company's chief coordination officer, also released a video statement on Facebook stating 'it is astonishing that we would neglect them. We must consider how strong they are in facing these challenges.'

==== Second press release ====
On 19 September 2024, GISB issued a revised press release featuring its chief executive officer, Nasiruddin Mohd Ali, acknowledging isolated cases of sodomy among the children, but continuing to deny allegations of human trafficking.

'Yes, there were one or two cases of sodomy among the children but why generalise all the other innocent children and accuse us of human trafficking?'
'I did not speak up earlier for fear of aggravating the situation. Our lawyers will start the legal process tomorrow.'

=== Arrests ===
==== Border arrest ====
On 18 September 2024, two motorhomes displaying GISB logos were spotted at the Bukit Kayu Hitam ICQS Complex, heading towards Thailand. According to the Immigration Department of Malaysia (JIM), the vehicles were at the border to renew their expiring International Circulation Permits. Upon being alerted by JIM about the vehicles' departure from the ICQS complex, the Kedah Criminal Investigation Department intercepted the motorhomes, inspected the vehicles, and seized them. Five drivers and passengers were detained, including an individual reported to be the son of a GISB leader.

==== Arrest of GISB leadership and members ====
On 19 September 2024, the company's chief executive officer (CEO), his wife and two children were among the 19 GISB executives who were remanded. This came after his press release acknowledging cases of sodomy in the children's homes. On 20 September 2024, seven members of GISB's Remaja Pembela Ummah was arrested to assist with an investigation into human trafficking. Those arrested include the sons of Ashaari Muhammad and GISB's CEO.

=== Mass raids and crackdowns on GISB-owned premises ===
Books seized by the Kelantan Islamic Religious Affairs Department officers at Nasiruddin's residence.

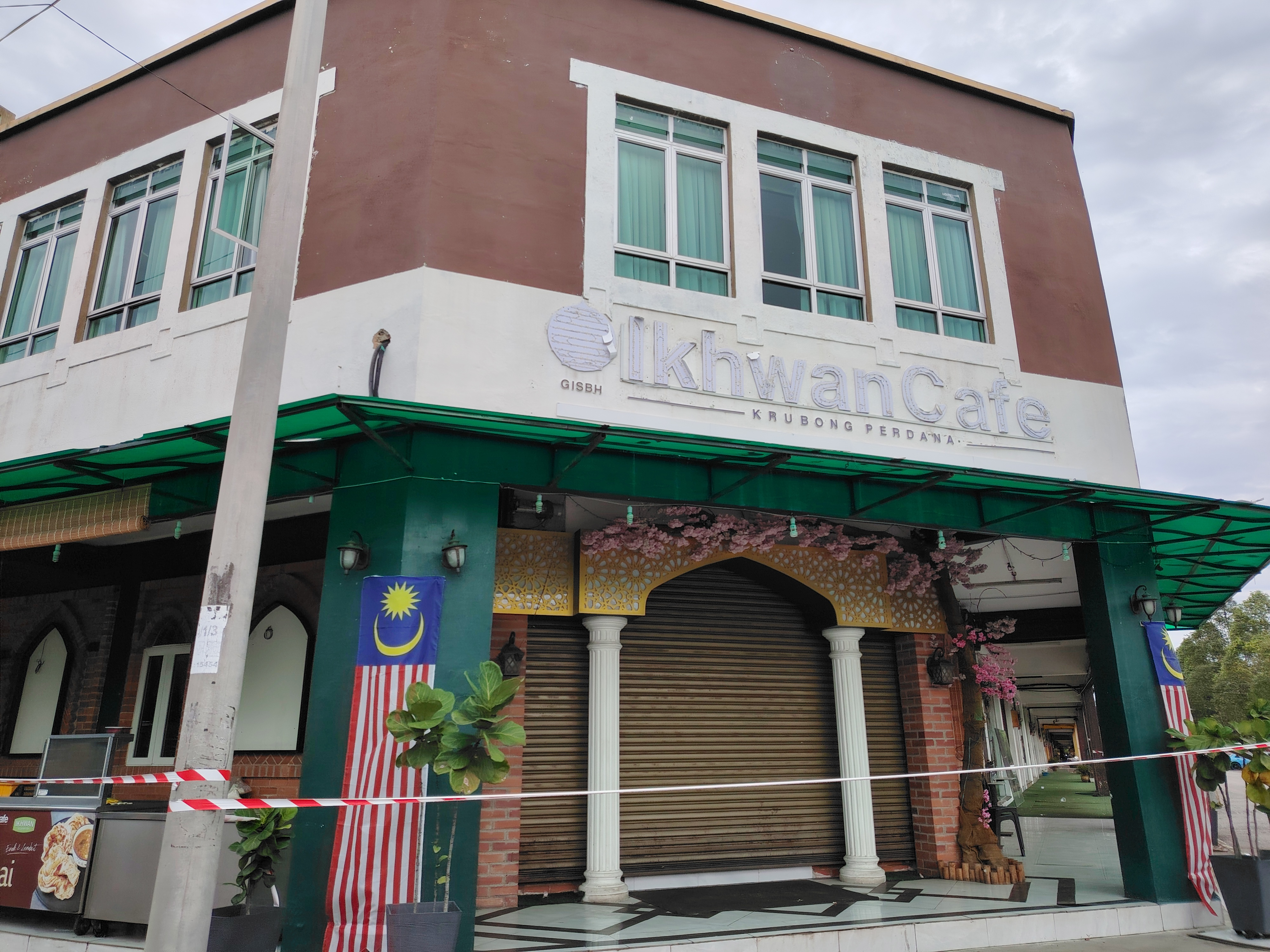
Shopfront of a GISB-owned cafeteria ("Ikhwan Cafe") in Krubong, Melaka

On 21 September 2024, local governments in Malaysia, alongside federal government agencies and the PDRM, initiated mass raids and crackdowns on GISB-owned premises across Peninsular Malaysia. Kelantan police and the Kelantan Islamic Religious Affairs Department jointly raided the residence of Nasiruddin Mohd Ali in Kampung Panji, Kota Bharu, where 30 people were found, including his second wife and over 20 children. Documents and books allegedly linked to Al-Arqam were uncovered, with some buried by a riverbank and others reportedly burned after news of the CEO's arrest. The IGP also announced that since 18 September 2024, the raids on GISB had resulted in 200 arrests and 37 investigation papers being initiated.

In Bandar Country Homes, Rawang, the headquarters of GISB, the Selayang Municipal Council and Federal Reserve Unit conducted raids on GISB-owned business premises and confiscated all assets belonging to the company. During the operation, the police seized 455 pamphlets and related logos, which were handed over to the Department of Islamic Development Malaysia (JAKIM), along with strands of beard that were among the confiscated items.

On mainland Penang, four raids targeting children's homes and businesses were conducted by the Penang Islamic Religious Affairs Department and police, uncovering six books related to Al-Arqam, including some outlawed by the Ministry of Home Affairs in 2011. Meanwhile, in Malacca, 19 children were rescued after raids on GISB premises in Melaka Tengah, Alor Gajah, and Jasin by the Melaka Islamic Religious Department and police. Of the 24 individuals detained, 11 were suspected of following Al-Arqam teachings. In phase four of Operation Global, a total of 155 people were arrested, comprising 78 men and 77 women.

In Tapah, Perak, four siblings were rescued from a GISB premise, where they had been subjected to physical abuse by GISB members. The siblings had been separated from their father since 2021. Medical examinations revealed signs of abuse in one of the children, and one of the rescued children was identified as the child caned with a rattan in a viral video.

=== GISB's tax evasion case ===
On 25 September 2024, a joint investigation between the Inland Revenue Board and police revealed that GISB never paid taxes on their business for years. The Ministry of Domestic Trade and Costs of Living later issued compounds amounting to RM 4.4m to 12 GISB-linked companies after the Companies Commission of Malaysia found they failed to submit their annual and financial statements.

Bukit Aman CID briefing the press while wearing the Op Global patch on their left arm.

=== Re-arrest of GISB members under SOSMA and further investigation ===
On 25 September 2024, 34 GISB members were re-arrested under the Security Offences (Special Measures) Act 2012 (SOSMA) after their remand period ended, while 127 others were released on bail.

On 10 October 2024, an additional 16 senior GISB members, including the CEO and his wife, were re-arrested as part of an organised crime investigation, bringing the total number of detainees under SOSMA to 58. During the investigation, authorities froze overseas assets linked to GISB valued at RM52.4 million across 10 countries. The investigation, which also covers organised crime under Section 130V(1) of the Penal Code and offences under AMLA, remains ongoing with support from Interpol and international authorities.

On 23 October 2024, the IGP confirmed that investigations are ongoing into more than 30 individuals still detained under SOSMA in connection with GISB Holdings. Of the approximately 60 individuals arrested under SOSMA, 22 have been charged in the Selayang Sessions Court, while investigations into the remaining detainees continue. Razarudin also indicated that police are tracking down any remaining individuals linked to GISB.

On 30 October 2024, GISB CEO Nasiruddin Mohd Ali and his wife Azura Md Yusof filed a habeas corpus application challenging their detention under SOSMA. The hearing for their application is set for December 2024.

Minors working in a GISB noodle factory. (GISB picture)

=== Legal challenges and responses ===
On 9 October 2024, a group of lawyers representing families connected to GISB announced that they were preparing legal action against the government. They claimed that the separation of children from their families during the police operation violated legal protocols, including those outlined in the Convention on the Rights of the Child. The legal team stated that they are gathering evidence to challenge the legality of the children's detention and to reunite them with their families.

On 11 October 2024, Home Minister Saifuddin Nasution Ismail responded to the claims, defending the actions of the police and Social Welfare Department. He affirmed that all procedures followed legal standards and due process, explaining that some children had been separated from their parents for years. Saifuddin questioned the timing of the parents' demands to regain custody after the operation.

On 13 October 2024, a group of 96 parents whose children were taken during the raids, demanded the immediate return of their children. According to the group's spokesperson Tun Faisal Ismail Aziz, many of the parents involved had no affiliation with GISB and claimed the authorities had committed human rights violations, including unlawful detentions and coercion. The group called for a judicial review of the extended detention orders, transparency on the children's whereabouts, and the establishment of a Royal Commission of Inquiry to investigate the execution of Operation Global.

=== Parliamentary debate ===
On 12 October 2024, it was announced that the operations and ongoing investigations into GISB would be debated during the Parliament session starting on 14 October. A ministerial statement was scheduled for the second day of the session, allowing Members of Parliament (MPs) to discuss the issue.

Minister in the Prime Minister's Department (Law and Institutional Reform), Azalina Othman, stated that three ministers would present their findings on the GISB issue in Parliament on 15 October 2024. Alongside the Home Minister, the ministers representing the Religious Affairs Department and the Ministry of Women, Family, and Community Development will also provide their insights into GISB's legal violations, religious teachings and the welfare of children linked to the organisation.

On 15 October 2024, Home Minister Saifuddin Nasution Ismail defended using SOSMA in the GISB case, citing serious allegations such as human trafficking and noting that investigations had extended to 18 foreign countries, where GISB-owned properties were identified. However, some Members of Parliament questioned the necessity of using SOSMA to detain 16 GISB members, including its CEO. Hassan Abdul Karim argued that, despite the accusations of deviant teachings, the legal rights of GISB members should be respected, while Takiyuddin Hassan added that SOSMA was disproportionate, given the lack of violent activities linked to the group.

Nancy Shukri, the Minister of Women, Family, and Community Development, discussed the government's plan to reunite children rescued from GISB with their families. She explained that this would only happen after the parents or families were assessed to ensure they could properly care for the children. In more complicated cases, the government would implement special programs to ensure the children's safety and well-being.

Mohd Na'im Mokhtar, the Minister in the Prime Minister's Department in charge of Religious Affairs, reported that investigations by JAKIM had found teachings within GISB that went against mainstream Islamic practices. These included seeking blessings from personal items of the organisation's leaders and combining religious rituals in unusual ways. The investigation also revealed that GISB members held beliefs about the Mahdi and salvation that were different from mainstream Islamic teachings.

On 17 October 2024, in response to a parliamentary query the Ministry of Home Affairs stated that no solid evidence has been found linking government officials or political leaders to GISB Holdings. However, investigations by the PDRM continue. The Ministry also noted that there are currently no plans to establish a Royal Commission of Inquiry (RCI).

On 24 October 2024, during the debate on the 2025 Malaysian Budget, Takiyuddin Hassan questioned the use of SOSMA concerning GISB members, who were charged with involvement in organised crime. He sought clarification from the government regarding the nature of the charges. Takiyuddin expressed concern about the potential misuse of the law while acknowledging that Perikatan Nasional supported the necessity of SOSMA. In response, RSN Rayer offered pro bono legal representation to the detained GISB members and voiced his opposition to the use of SOSMA in this case.

=== Alleged indoctrination of children ===
On 13 October 2024, the IGP, Razarudin Husain stated that police are also investigating whether the children rescued from GISB homes were exposed to militant ideas. Claims have surfaced suggesting that the children were shown videos promoting extremist views during their time at the homes. The police continue to investigate how these videos were shared with the children. This followed comments by Selangor Islamic Affairs and Innovation Development Committee chairman Dr. Mohammad Fahmi Ngah, who suggested that the children may have been exposed to these videos during their time at the homes.

== Response ==
=== Federal government ===
Prime Minister Anwar Ibrahim urged the authorities, including the Selangor Islamic Religious Department (JAIS), the Federal Territories Islamic Religious Department (JAWI), and JAKIM, to take appropriate action regarding the issue.

=== State governments ===
By 30 November 2024, seven states in Malaysia—Perlis, Selangor, Pahang, Melaka, Sabah, Penang and Johor—had outlawed GISB and declared its teachings deviant.

On 20 September 2024, Perlis became the first state in Malaysia to classify GISB as a deviant group after Perlis State Fatwa Committee issued a fatwa stating that the beliefs and teachings in GISB contains characteristics of deviant teachings. The State Fatwa Committee also added that GISB 'is a continuation of Al-Arqam teachings, which were banned nationwide' and that 'such beliefs are deviant and have strayed from Islam.'

On 21 September 2024, the Sultan of Selangor ordered the Selangor Islamic Religious Department to cooperate with the police in investigating the child abuse scandal. He also directed the Selangor State Fatwa Committee to issue a ruling concerning GISB. The chairman of the Selangor Islamic Religious Council issued a statement instructing religious enforcement officers to investigate all charity homes and schools linked to GISB to ensure that no deviant teachings were being propagated. On 3 October 2024, Selangor became the second state to declare GISB a deviant group after investigations revealed that they still adhere to Al-Arqam teachings in their beliefs and practices.

On 5 October 2024, GISB was officially deviant in Pahang after a special meeting convened by Sultan Abdullah concluded with a ruling that declared the group misguided and deviant according to Islamic teachings.

On 14 October 2024, the Melaka Fatwa Committee issued a fatwa declaring GISB teachings as deviant during a special committee meeting on 3 October. The Melaka Religious Department and the Royal Malaysia Police also conducted operations at GISB premises in the state.

On 18 October 2024, the Penang State Fatwa Committee declared the teachings and practices of GISB as deviant, aligning Penang with five other states that have issued similar rulings. The decision, based on findings from the Penang Islamic Religious Affairs Department (JHEAIPP) and state police, highlighted that GISB’s beliefs and practices diverge from accepted Islamic teachings. The fatwa restricts any association with GISB activities, including support, distribution of materials, or participation in events. To aid individuals affected by GISB’s practices, Penang has established the Darul Hidayah Complex as a faith recovery center, pending formal gazettement following royal consent.

Sabah, through its Islamic Affairs Coordination Committee (JaPHEIS), and the Sarawak police, closely monitored the activities of GISB in their respective states following the scandal. By October 2024, after extensive monitoring and operations by authorities, almost all GISB premises in both states were closed down and ceased operations. On 22 October 2024, the Sabah State Fatwa Council declared GISB's teachings deviant, making it the 17th banned group in the state.

On 25 November 2024, Johor declared the teachings, beliefs, and practices of GISB as deviant. Johor Mufti Datuk Yahya Ahmad stated that the group's teachings contradict Islamic faith and doctrine. The ruling aligns with decisions by the Muzakarah Committee of the National Council for Islamic Religious Affairs Malaysia (MKI). The Johor Islamic Religious Department is collaborating with relevant authorities to monitor GISB activities and curb their spread online. Johor joins other states, including Perlis, Selangor, Pahang, Sabah, Melaka, and Penang, in declaring GISB’s teachings as deviant.

=== Abuse allegations by former members ===
Several former members of GISB have come forward with allegations of abuse and coercion within the organisation. One former member, Zoey, reported in October 2024 that she was forced into marriage at 17 to an influential member of GISB. She described enduring physical and sexual abuse throughout her 14-year marriage and claimed that her attempts to seek help from GISB leadership were ignored. With assistance from relatives and non-governmental organisations, Zoey filed for divorce and relocated to Singapore with her nine children in 2021.

On 20 October 2024, Ummu Atiyah Ashaari, the daughter of former Al-Arqam leader Ashaari Muhammad, provided her testimony to the police. She alleged that she was wrongfully confined in a two-room house for approximately one month. She revealed that she attempted to escape but was recaptured and confined again. Ummu Atiyah led police to the location where she claimed she had been detained by GISB members, further asserting that she was compelled to marry a GISB leader in Turkey before being brought back to Malaysia. These allegations have prompted police investigations into GISB's practices concerning confinement and coercion.

=== Royal Commission of Inquiry Proposal ===
On 23 October 2024, the Human Rights Commission of Malaysia (Suhakam) proposed the establishment of a Royal Commission of Inquiry to investigate allegations of child exploitation linked to GISB. Suhakam's children's commissioner, Dr. Farah Nini Dusuki, emphasised the need for a thorough and transparent investigation to address the welfare of children under GISB's care and how such issues had persisted over the years.

=== Conference of Rulers ===
On 23 October 2024, the Islamic law perspective on GISB was presented to the Conference of Rulers. Deputy Minister in the Prime Minister's Department (Religious Affairs) Dr. Zulkifli Hasan reported that JAKIM conducted a study on legal opinions regarding GISB during a recent National Council for Islamic Religious Affairs (MKI) meeting. JAKIM plans to strengthen the faith of GISB members through educational initiatives and cooperation with state Islamic religious councils.

== Court proceedings ==
On 12 September 2024, a 19-year-old was charged in Seremban, Negeri Sembilan, with four counts of physical abuse involving girls aged five to six at a childcare center affiliated with GISB in Rasah. On 18 September 2024, a GISB member was charged with criminal intimidation after allegedly threatening a woman in a Putrajaya car park to withdraw a police report filed against him.

On 19 September 2024, three GISB madrasah teaching assistants were charged with 14 counts of sexual assault involving five children in Kuala Pilah, Negeri Sembilan. The following day, on 20 September 2024, another teaching assistant from Kuala Pilah was charged with six counts of sexual assault involving four boys aged nine to 11.

On 26 September 2024, Barur Rahim Hisam, a caretaker at a GISB children's home, was sentenced to 10 years in prison after pleading guilty to four charges relating to child abuse. He became the first person to be sentenced for the ongoing Op Global investigation.

On 13 October 2024, three GISB members were charged in Kota Tinggi, Johor. Two of them faced four counts of human trafficking involving three women and one man, allegedly for forced labour between August 2023 and October 2024 at Ikhwan Resort in Bandar Penawar. One of them, a 20 year old, was charged with two counts of sexual assault involving a 16-year-old boy in June 2024 at the resort's surau. On 30 October 2024, a GISB cafe manager was charged at the Kota Tinggi Sessions Court with four counts of human trafficking for forced labor at Ikhwan Resort in Bandar Penawar between May and October 2024. The charges were made under Section 12 of the Anti-Trafficking in Persons and Anti-Smuggling of Migrants Act 2007 (ATIPSOM), read with Section 34 of the Penal Code.

On 14 October 2024, a warden at a centre affiliated with GISB, was charged with sexual abuse of a 13-year-old child. The incident allegedly occurred at Rumah Jagaan Harapan Al Mahabbah on 11 July 2022 in Nibong Tebal, Penang. The charges were filed under Section 14(a) of the Sexual Offences Against Children Act 2017 (SOACA).

On 22 October 2024, the IGP announced that Nasiruddin Mohd Ali, his wife Azura Md Yusof and Mohammad Adib At-Tamimi, son of Al-Arqam founder Ashaari Muhammad, would be charged at the Selayang Sessions Court on 23 October under Section 130V(1) of the Penal Code for being members of an organised criminal group. If convicted, they face imprisonment of five to 20 years. On 23 October 2024 these individuals were formally charged, and their trial is scheduled to take place at the Kuala Lumpur High Court, with the next mention date set for 23 December 2024. The IGP further confirmed that investigations are ongoing into more than 30 remaining detainees under SOSMA, as well as any additional individuals associated with GISB.

On 30 October 2024, a woman was charged in the Anti-Trafficking in Persons Sessions Court with 10 counts of child exploitation, alleging that she trafficked ten children for exploitation at Cahaya Kasih Bestari Care Centre in Kampung Melayu Subang on 11 September 2024. The charges were filed under Sections 415/417 of the Penal Code and Section 14 of ATIPSOM. In a separate case, another woman was charged in the Klang Magistrates' Court with operating an unregistered care center in North Klang on 11 September 2024, under Section 5(1) of the Care Centres Act 1993.

== Aftermath ==
As a result of the scandal, GISB premises across Peninsular Malaysia were closed or shut down by authorities after being raided. Those located within Kelantan, Pahang, Perak, Putrajaya, Selangor, and Terengganu were all closed. All GISB homes in Selangor were also ordered to close by the state government. The police also froze 153 bank accounts worth RM882,795.94 and seized 22 motorcars of various types, 14 land parcels, 455 copies of publishing material and logos, 90 mobile phones, 16 computers, 26 animals (including nine horses, 14 rabbits, and three peacocks), 13 vehicles, two necklaces, and over RM18,000 in cash during the operation.

The Yang di-Pertua Negeri of Melaka, upon receiving advice from the Chief Minister, revoked GISB's CEO Nasiruddin Mohd Ali's Datukship.

== Related cases ==
On 23 September 2024, the Perlis Mufti, Mohd Asri Zainul Abidin, who speaks actively about GISB and its alleged wrongdoings, was threatened via WhatsApp by an unknown number. The message claimed that GISB's business was unrivalled in the country. When the mufti ignored the initial messages, further provocations and threats were sent, referring to him as a 'kafir harbi,' a term used to describe a non-Muslim against whom war can be waged. The mufti subsequently lodged a police report following the incident.

On 1 October 2024, Mohd Asri filed a defamation lawsuit against GISB at the Shah Alam High Court. The lawsuit, valued at RM10 million, alleges that GISB made defamatory statements about him during a press conference held on 29 August 2024 and through a Facebook post published on 16 August. According to the statement of claim, the Facebook post and accompanying materials portrayed him as a religious leader failing to uphold religious principles, thereby damaging his reputation, dignity, and public image. The lawsuit names GISB and its deputy director of administration, Mokhtar Tajuddin, as the first and second defendants. In addition to monetary damages, the plaintiff seeks a public apology, the deletion of all defamatory content, and an injunction to prevent further publication of similar statements.

== See also ==
- Al-Arqam
- 2008 YFZ Ranch raid - earlier same cases in USA
