= Ministry of Agriculture and Food Security (Malaysia) =

Government ministry of Malaysia

Ministry of Agriculture and Food Security (MAFS)
- Kementerian Pertanian dan Keterjaminan Makanan (KPKM)
- Coat of arms of Malaysia

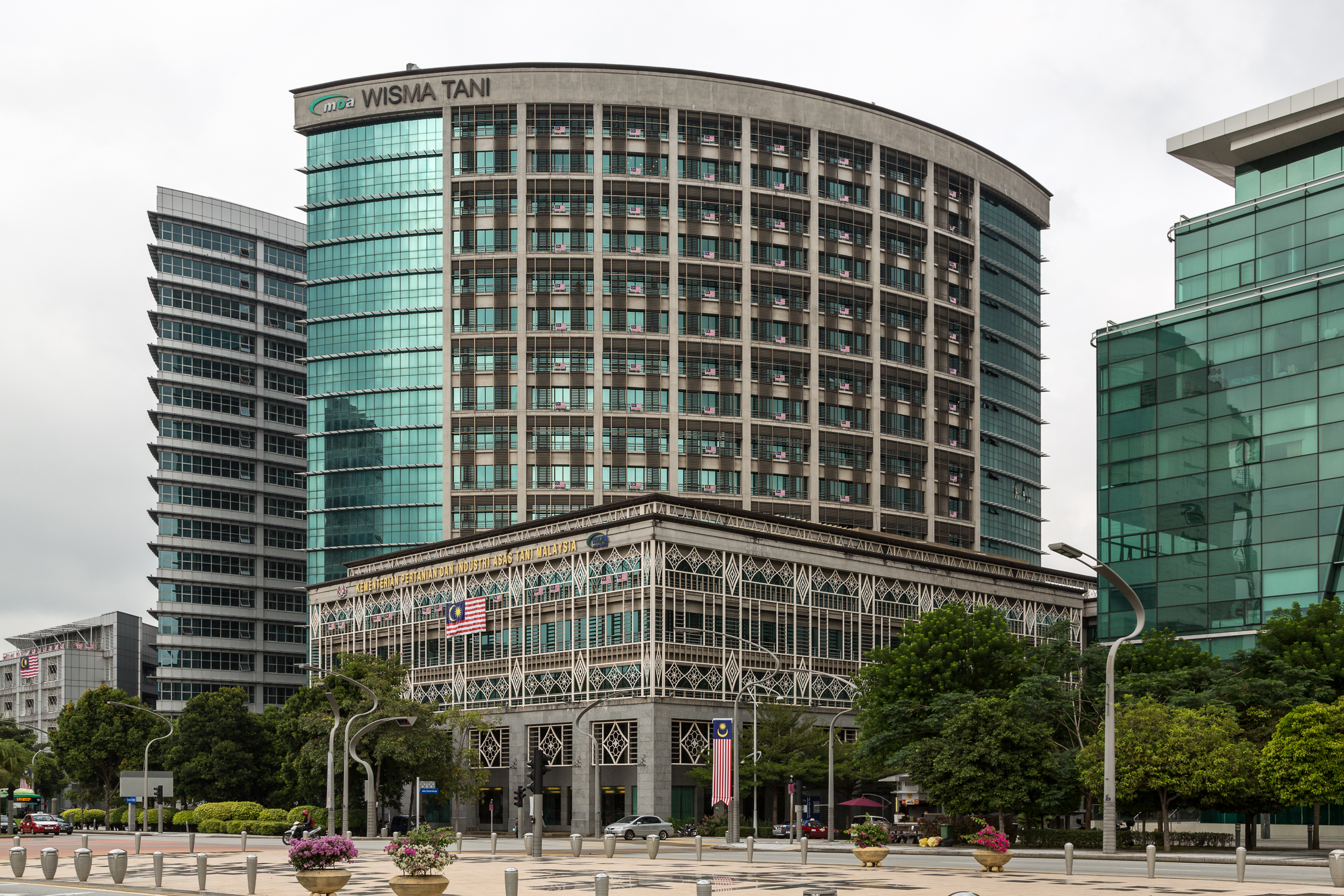

Ministry overview
- Preceding ministry: Ministry of Agriculture and Food Industry (MAFI)
- Jurisdiction: Government of Malaysia
- Headquarters: Block 4G1, Wisma Tani, No. 28, Persiaran Perdana, Precinct 4, Federal Government Administrative Centre, 62624 Putrajaya
- Employees: 10,539 (2023)
- Annual budget: MYR 6,868,552,800 (2026)
- Minister responsible: Datuk Seri Haji Mohamad Sabu, Minister of Agriculture and Food Security
- Deputy Minister responsible: Datuk Chan Foong Hin, Deputy Agriculture and Food Security
- Ministry executives: Datuk Seri Isham bin Ishak, Secretary-General; Dato' Luqman bin Ahmad, Deputy Secretary-General (Development); Dato' Seri Norazman bin Ayob, Deputy Secretary-General (Policy); Yuswan bin Yunus, Senior Under-Secretary (Management)
- Website: www.kpkm.gov.my

Footnotes
- Ministry of Agriculture and Food Security on Facebook

The Ministry of Agriculture and Food Security (Malay: Kementerian Pertanian dan Keterjaminan Makanan; KPKM), abbreviated MAFS, is a ministry of the Government of Malaysia that is responsible for agriculture, agro-based industry, agritourism, livestock, veterinary services, fisheries, quarantine, inspection, agricultural research, agricultural development, agricultural marketing, pineapple industry, agribusiness, botanical garden, food security, food sovereignty.

== Organisation ==
- Minister of Agriculture and Food Security
  - Deputy Minister
    - Secretary-General
      - Under the Authority of Secretary-General
        - Legal Advisor Office
        - Corporate Communication Unit
        - Internal Audit Unit
        - Integrity Unit
      - Deputy Secretary-General (Development)
        - Food Security Division
        - Paddy Industry Development Division
        - Food and Agro-based Industry Division
        - Development Division
        - Agriculture Drainage and Irrigation Division
      - Deputy Secretary-General (Planning)
        - Policy and Strategic Planning Division
        - Capacity Development and Agriculture Training Division
        - International Division
        - Business Development and Investment Division
        - Agriculture Modernisation Division
      - Senior Under-Secretary (Management)
        - Human Resource Management Division
        - Finance Division
        - Account Division
        - Information Management Division
        - Administration Division

=== Federal departments ===
1. Department of Agriculture Malaysia (DOA), or Jabatan Pertanian. (Official site)
2. Department of Veterinary Services (DVS), or Jabatan Perkhidmatan Veterinar. (Official site)
3. Department of Fisheries Malaysia (DOF), or Jabatan Perikanan Malaysia. (Official site)
4. Malaysian Quarantine and Inspection Services Department (MAQIS), or Jabatan Perkhidmatan Kuarantin dan Pemeriksaan Malaysia. (Official site)

=== Federal agencies ===
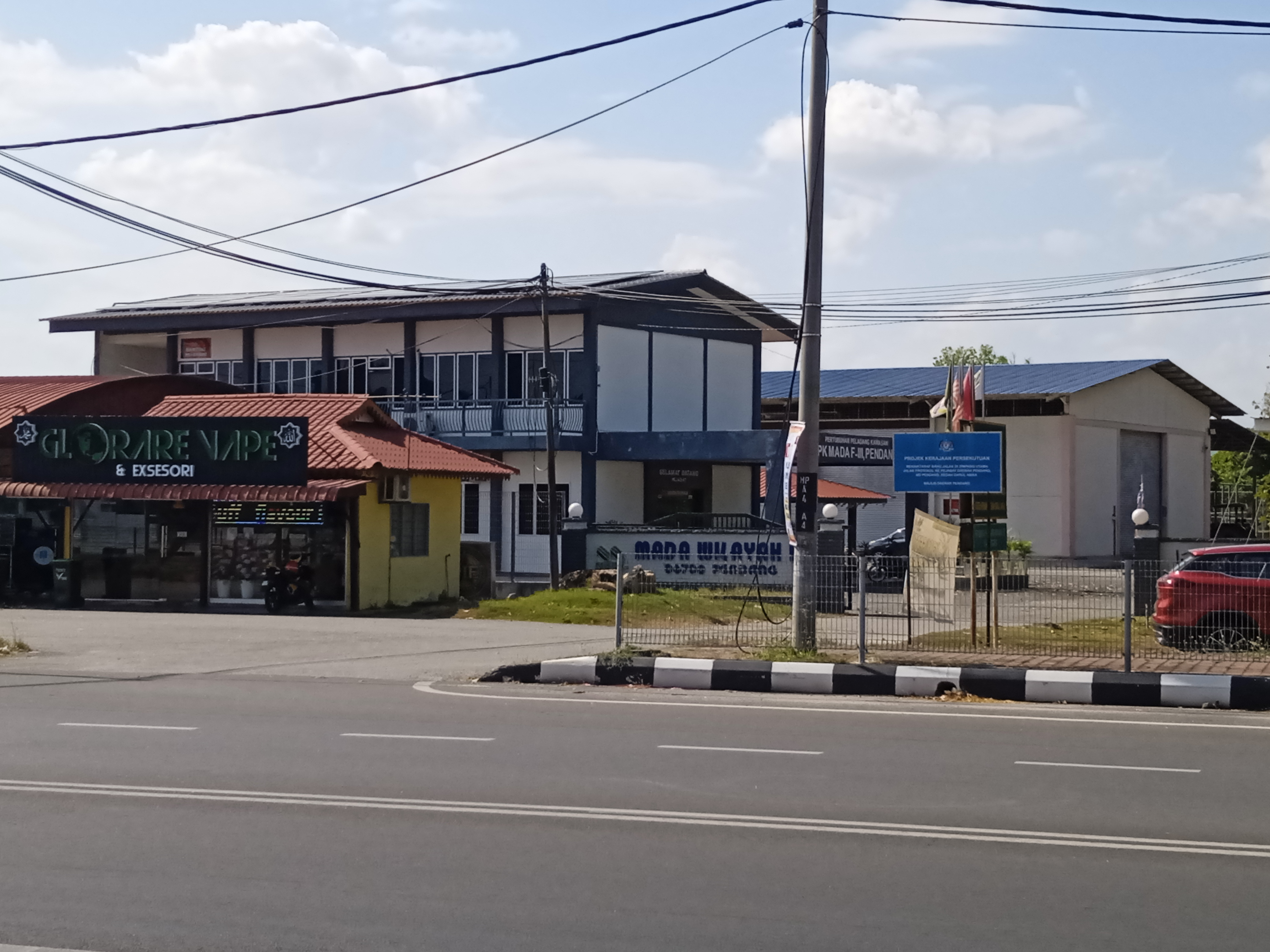
Muda Agricultural Development Authority

1. Malaysian Agricultural Research and Development Institute (MARDI), or Institut Penyelidikan dan Kemajuan Pertanian Malaysia. (Official site)
2. Farmers' Organization Authority, or Lembaga Pertubuhan Peladang (LPP). (Official site)
3. Federal Agricultural Marketing Authority (FAMA), or Lembaga Pemasaran Pertanian Persekutuan. (Official site)
4. Fisheries Development Authority of Malaysia, or Lembaga Kemajuan Ikan Malaysia (LKIM). (Official site)
5. Muda Agricultural Development Authority (MADA), or Lembaga Kemajuan Peladang Muda. (Official site)
6. Malaysian Pineapple Industry Board (MPIB), or Lembaga Perindustrian Nanas Malaysia (LPNM). (Official site)
7. Kemubu Agricultural Development Authority (KADA), or Lembaga Kemajuan Pertanian Kemubu. (Official site)
8. Agrobank, or Bank Pertanian Malaysia Berhad. (Official site)

== Fund for Food (3F) ==
To increase food production in Malaysia and reduce food imports, Bank Negara Malaysia and Ministry of Agriculture both provide financing at a reasonable cost, with a minimum of RM10,000 funding.

Only Malaysian-owned institutions (at least 51% ownership) are eligible for the financing. (incorporated under the Companies Act 1965, the Co-operative Societies Act 1993, the Societies Act 1966, citizens residing in Malaysia and entrepreneurs registered under the Companies Commission of Malaysia or any other authoritative bodies)

== Key legislation ==
The Ministry of Agriculture and Food Industries is responsible for administration of several key Acts:

- Malaysian Agricultural Research and Development Institute Act 1969
- Fisheries Act 1985

== Ministers ==
Minister	Portrait	Office	Executive Experience
Mohamad Sabu		Minister of Agriculture and Food Security	MP for Nilam Puri (October 1990 – April 1995); MP for Kubang Kerian (April 1995 – November 1999); MP for Kuala Kedah (November 1999 – March 2004); MP for Kota Raja (May 2018 – current); Minister of Defence (May 2018 – February 2020)
Chan Foong Hin		Deputy Minister of Agriculture and Food Security	MLA for Sri Tanjong (May 2013 – May 2018); MP for Kota Kinabalu (May 2018 – current); Deputy Minister of Agriculture and Food Security (December 2022 – December 2023; December 2025 – current); Deputy Minister of Plantation and Commodities (December 2023 – December 2025)

== See also ==
- Minister of Agriculture and Food Security (Malaysia)
- Agriculture in Malaysia
