= Revision of Laws Act 1968 =

Parliament of Malaysia
- Long title: An Act to provide for the revision and reprinting of laws and subsidiary legislation.
- Citation: Act 1
- Territorial extent: Throughout Malaysia
- Passed by: Dewan Rakyat
- Passed: 17 October 1968
- Passed by: Dewan Negara
- Passed: 22 October 1968
- Royal assent: 24 December 1968
- Commenced: 31 December 1968
- Effective: 1 January 1969

Legislative history

Initiating chamber: Dewan Rakyat
- Bill title: Revision of Laws Bill 1968
- Introduced by: Bahaman Samsudin, Minister of Justice
- First reading: September 1968
- Second reading: 17 October 1968
- Third reading: 17 October 1968

Revising chamber: Dewan Negara
- Bill title: Revision of Laws Bill 1968
- Member(s) in charge: Bahaman Samsudin, Minister of Justice
- First reading: 22 October 1968
- Second reading: 22 October 1968
- Third reading: 22 October 1968

Repeals
- Reprint of Federal Laws Act 1965 [No. 26 of 1965] Section 48 of the Interpretation and General Clauses Ordinance 1948 [M.U. 7 of 1948]

Amended by
- Emergency (Revision of Laws) (Amendment) Ordinance 1970 [P.U. (A) 107/1970] Revision of Laws (Amendment) Act 1971 [Act A43] Constitution (Amendment) Act 1994 [Act A885] Revision of Laws (Amendment) Act 1999 [Act A1061]
- Status: In force

The Revision of Laws Act 1968 (Malay: Akta Penyemakan Undang-undang 1968), is a Malaysian law which enacted to provide for the revision and reprinting of laws and subsidiary legislation.

After the commencement of this Act on 1 January 1969, all federal Acts of Parliament are issued under the "Laws of Malaysia" series and were chronologically numbered, with this Act forming "Act 1" in the aforementioned series.

== Structure ==
The Revision of Laws Act 1968, in its current form (1 August 2008), consists of 18 sections and no schedule (including 4 amendments), without separate Parts.

- Section 1: Short title
- Section 2: Interpretation
- Section 3: Appointment of Commissioner
- Section 4: Appointment of Committee
- Section 5: Printing of revised laws
- Section 6: Powers of the Commissioner
- Section 7: Method of compiling a revised law
- Section 8: Examination by the Committee
- Section 9: Revised law to comply with Committee's opinion
- Section 10: Publication of revised law
- Section 11: Completion of revision of pre-1969 laws to be notified in Gazette
- Section 12: Saving of existing subsidiary legislation
- Section 13: Revision of subsidiary legislation
- Section 14: Reprint of laws
- Section 14A: Publication volume by volume
- Section 14B: Updating of reprints
- Section 14C: Delegation of powers
- Section 15: Rectification of formal errors
- Section 16: Reference to number of line in any law
- Section 17: Place of this Act in the Laws of Malaysia series
- Section 18: Repeal
