= Postal Services Act =

Postal Services Act may refer to:

== Malaysia ==
- Postal Services Act 1991 (Act 465), an Act of Parliament in Malaysia
- Postal Services (Successor Company) Act 1991 (Act 466), an Act of Parliament in Malaysia
- Postal Services Act 2012 (Act 741), provides for the licensing of postal services and the regulation of the postal services industry

== United Kingdom ==
- Postal Services Act 2000 (c. 26), established an industry regulator, a consumer watchdog, and required a "universal service" of post to be provided
- Postal Services Act 2011 (c. 5), enabled the British Government to sell shares in Royal Mail to private investors

== United States ==
- The US Postal Service Act of 1792.

== See also ==
- Postal Act (disambiguation)
