= Postal Act =

Postal Act may refer to:

- Postal Reorganization Act, a United States federal government administration legislation of 1970
- Postal Service Act, a piece of United States federal legislation of 1792

== See also ==
- Postal Services Act (disambiguation)
