= Malaysian Quarantine and Inspection Services Department =

Malaysian government agency

- Jabatan Perkhidmatan Kuarantin dan Pemeriksaan Malaysia جابتن ڤرخدمتن كوارنتين دان ڤمريقسأن مليسيا

Department overview
- Formed: 1 April 2013; 13 years ago
- Jurisdiction: Government of Malaysia
- Headquarters: Level 4, Menara 4G1, Wisma Tani, No. 28, Persiaran Perdana, Precinct 4, Federal Government Administrative Centre, 62624, Putrajaya
- Minister responsible: Datuk Seri Mohamad Sabu, Minister of Agriculture and Food Security
- Department executive: Tuan Mohamad Shaffie bin Hassan, Director-General
- Parent Department: Ministry of Agriculture and Food Security
- Key document: Malaysian Quarantine and Inspection Services Act 2011
- Website: www.maqis.gov.my

The Malaysian Quarantine and Inspection Services Department (Malay: Jabatan Perkhidmatan Kuarantin dan Pemeriksaan Malaysia; Jawi: جابتن ڤرخدمتن كوارنتين دان ڤمريقسأن مليسيا; officially abbreviated as MAQIS) is a Malaysian government agency under the Ministry of Agriculture and Food Security that is responsible for enforcing Malaysian quarantine laws and provides an integrated services related to quarantine and inspection works, particularly for agricultural and agro-based products. Since its establishment in 2013, MAQIS has been regarded as a bastion of the nation's biosecurity.

== History ==
In 2005, Muhyiddin Yassin, the then-Minister of Agriculture and Agro-Based Industry, came up with the idea for the establishment of the MAQIS as a single body to provide quarantine and inspection services at the country's entry points, which was modelled after the Australian Quarantine and Inspection Service (AQIS), which have a similar roles.

MAQIS was formally established on 1 March 2013 under Malaysian Quarantine and Inspection Services Act 2011 (Act 728) and took over many functions of the policy departments under the Ministry which previously carried out their functions separately prior to 2008. In 2021, MAQIS amended the Act 728 which allows the department to expand further its enforcement powers.

== Functions ==
MAQIS' main function is to control all 57 Malaysian border entry points by inspecting all agricultural goods imported into the country to ensure they are safe for every Malaysians to consume. The department also prevents the entry of unsafe agricultural goods and many attempts to bring unsafe agricultural goods into the country have been successfully blocked. Apart from it, MAQIS also provides quarantine, inspection and enforcement services at all Malaysian border entry points.
