= Registration of Criminals and Undesirable Persons Act 1969 =

Parliament of Malaysia
- Long title: An Act to consolidate and amend the law providing for the registration of certain criminals, banishees, expelees, deportees and restrictees and for other purposes connected with it.
- Citation: Act 7
- Territorial extent: Throughout Malaysia
- Passed by: Dewan Rakyat
- Passed: 12 February 1969
- Passed by: Dewan Negara
- Passed: 26 February 1969
- Royal assent: 22 April 1969
- Commenced: 1 May 1969
- Effective: [Throughout Malaysia—2 May 1969]

Legislative history

Initiating chamber: Dewan Rakyat
- Bill title: Registration of Criminals and Undesirable Persons Bill 1969
- Bill citation: D.R.27/1969
- Introduced by: Hamzah Abu Samah, Assistant Minister of Home Affairs
- First reading: 10 January 1969
- Second reading: 12 February 1969
- Third reading: 12 February 1969

Revising chamber: Dewan Negara
- Bill title: Registration of Criminals and Undesirable Persons Bill 1969
- Bill citation: D.R.27/1969
- Member(s) in charge: Abdul Ghafar Baba, Minister without Portfolio
- First reading: 24 February 2018
- Second reading: 26 February 2018
- Third reading: 26 February 2018

Amended by
- Corrigendum [P.U. (B) 180/1969] Registration of Criminals and Undesirable Persons (Registrable Offences) (Amendment) Order 1972 [P.U. (A) 216/1972] Registration of Criminals and Undesirable Persons (Amendment) Order 1976 [P.U. (A) 249/1976] Registration of Criminals and Undesirable Persons (Amendment) (No. 2) Order 1976 [P.U. (A) 250/1976] Registration of Criminals and Undesirable Persons (Amendment) Order 1977 [P.U. (A) 57/1977] Registration of Criminals and Undesirable Persons (Amendment) (No. 2) Order 1977 [P.U. (A) 58/1977] Registration of Criminals and Undesirable Persons (Amendment) Order 1983 [P.U. (A) 89/1983] Registration of Criminals and Undesirable Persons (Amendment) Order 1984 [P.U. (A) 264/1984] Registration of Criminals and Undesirable Persons (Amendment) Order 1985 [P.U. (A) 455/1985] Registration of Criminals and Undesirable Persons (Amendment of Schedule) Order 1993 [P.U. (A) 165/1993] Registration of Criminals and Undesirable Persons (Amendment of Schedule) Order 1998 [P.U. (A) 19/1998]

Related legislation
- Registration of Criminals Ordinance (States of Malaya) [18/1948] Fingerprints Ordinance (Sabah) [18/1956] Fingerprints Ordinance (Sarawak) [14/1958]
- Status: In force

The Registration of Criminals and Undesirable Persons Act 1969 (Malay: Akta Pendaftaran Penjenayah dan Orang yang Tidak Diingini 1969), is an Act of the Parliament of Malaysia. It was enacted to consolidate and amend the law providing for the registration of certain criminals, banishees, expelees, deportees and restrictees and for other purposes connected with it.

== Structure ==
The Registration of Criminals and Undesirable Persons Act 1969, in its current form (1 January 2006), consists of 16 sections and 3 schedules (including 11 amendments), without separate Part.

- Section 1: Short title and application
- Section 2: Interpretation
- Section 3: Appointment of officers
- Section 4: Minister may deem or declare other particulars to be registrable particulars
- Section 5: Functions of recording officer
- Section 6: Functions of authenticating officer
- Section 7: Register of registrable particulars to be kept
- Section 8: Refusal to sign fingerprint form an offence
- Section 9: Return of fingerprint form on acquittal, etc.
- Section 10: Proof of finger impressions and previous convictions
- Section 11: Proof of previous convictions outside the Federation
- Section 12: Inspector General may exempt certain cases from provision of Act
- Section 13: Minister may order destruction of particulars of banishee, etc.
- Section 14: Regulations
- Section 15: Schedules and forms
- Section 16: Repeal and transitional
- Schedules
