= Computer Crimes Act 1997 =

Internet crimes law in Malaysia

Parliament of Malaysia
- Long title: An Act to provide for offences relating to the misuse of computers.
- Citation: Act 563
- Territorial extent: Throughout Malaysia
- Passed by: Dewan Rakyat
- Passed: 30 April 1997
- Passed by: Dewan Negara
- Passed: 3 June 1997
- Royal assent: 18 June 1997
- Commenced: 30 June 1997
- Effective: [1 June 2000, P.U. (B) 175/2000]

Legislative history

Initiating chamber: Dewan Rakyat
- Bill title: Computer Crimes Bill 1997
- Bill citation: D.R. 03/1997
- Introduced by: Leo Moggie Irok, Minister of Energy, Telecommunications and Posts
- First reading: 25 March 1997
- Second reading: 28 April 1997
- Third reading: 30 April 1997

Revising chamber: Dewan Negara
- Bill title: Computer Crimes Bill 1997
- Bill citation: D.R. 03/1997
- Member(s) in charge: Leo Moggie Irok, Minister of Energy, Telecommunications and Posts
- First reading: 12 May 1997
- Second reading: 2 June 1997
- Third reading: 3 June 1997
- Status: In force

The Computer Crimes Act 1997 (Malay: Akta Jenayah Komputer 1997), is a Malaysian law which was enacted to provide for offences relating to the misuse of computers.

== Structure ==
The Computer Crimes Act 1997, in its current form (1 January 2006), consists of 3 Parts containing 12 sections and no schedule (including no amendment).

- Part I: Preliminary
- Part II: Offences
- Part III: Ancillary and General Provisions

In July 2026, both houses of the Parliament of Malaysia passed the Cybercrimes Bill 2026, which would repeal and replace the Computer Crimes Act. The bill expanded the legal framework to cover offences including online fraud, digital impersonation and abuse involving artificially generated content. It remained subject to royal assent and gazettement.
