= Hire-Purchase Act 1967 =

Malaysian legislation

Parliament of Malaysia
- Long title: An Act to regulate the form and contents of hire-purchase agreements, the rights and duties of parties to such agreements and to make provisions for other matters connected therewith and incidental thereto.
- Citation: Act 212
- Territorial extent: Throughout Malaysia
- Passed by: Dewan Rakyat
- Passed: 1 March 1967
- Enacted: 1967 (Act No. 24 of 1967] Revised: 1978 (Act 212 w.e.f 15 November 1978)
- Passed by: Dewan Negara
- Passed: 11 March 1967
- Effective: [11 April 1968, P.U. (B) 150/1968]

Legislative history

First chamber: Dewan Rakyat
- Bill title: Hire-Purchase Bill 1967
- Introduced by: Lim Swee Aun, Minister of Commerce and Industry
- First reading: 24 January 1967
- Second reading: 1 March 1967
- Third reading: 1 March 1967

Second chamber: Dewan Negara
- Bill title: Hire-Purchase Bill 1967
- Member(s) in charge: T. H. Tan, Senator
- First reading: 6 March 1967
- Second reading: 11 March 1967
- Third reading: 11 March 1967

Amended by
- Hire-Purchase (Amendment) Act 1968 [Act 4/1968] Hire-Purchase (Amendment) Act 1969 [Act A20] Malaysian Currency (Ringgit) Act 1975 [Act 160] Hire-Purchase (Amendment) Act 1976 [Act A332] Hire-Purchase Order 1980 [P.U. (A) 221/1980] Hire-Purchase (Amendment of First Schedule) Order 1983 [P.U. (A) 149/1983] Hire-Purchase (Amendment) Act 1992 [Act A813] Hire-Purchase (Amendment) Act 2004 [Act A1234] Hire-Purchase (Amendment of Schedule) Order 2005 [P.U. (A) 163/2005] Hire-Purchase (Amendment) Act 2010 [Act A1384]

Related legislation
- Bills of Sale Ordinance 1950 of the States of Malaya [F.M. No. 30 of 1950] Bills of Sale Ordinance of Sabah [Cap. 14] Bills of Sale Ordinance of Sarawak [Cap. 68]
- Status: In force

The Hire-Purchase Act 1967 (Malay: Akta Sewa Beli 1967), is a Malaysian law which enacted to regulate the form and contents of hire-purchase agreements, the rights and duties of parties to such agreements and to make provisions for other matters connected therewith and incidental thereto.

== Structure ==
The Hire-Purchase Act 1967, in its current form (30 July 2012), consists of 9 Parts containing 58 sections and 7 schedules (including 10 amendments).

- Part I: Preliminary
- Part II: Formation and Contents of Hire-Purchase Agreements
- Part IIA: Option to Hirer
- Part III: Protection of Hirers and Guarantors
  - Warranties and Conditions
- Part IV: Hirers
  - Statutory rights of hirers
- Part V: Guarantors
- Part VI: Insurance
- Part VII: General
- Part VIII: Powers of Enforcement
- Part IX: Regulations, etc.
- Schedules
