= Digital Signature Act 1997 =

Malaysian law

Parliament of Malaysia
- Long title: An Act to make provision for, and to regulate the use of, digital signatures and to provide for matters connected therewith.
- Citation: Act 562
- Territorial extent: Throughout Malaysia
- Passed by: Dewan Rakyat
- Passed: 5 May 1997
- Passed by: Dewan Negara
- Passed: 3 June 1997
- Royal assent: 18 June 1997
- Commenced: 30 June 1997
- Effective: 1 October 1998 [P.U.(B) 397/1998]

Legislative history

First chamber: Dewan Rakyat
- Bill title: Digital Signature Bill 1997
- Bill citation: D.R. 02/1997
- Introduced by: Leo Moggie Irok, Minister of Energy, Telecommunications and Posts
- First reading: 25 March 1997
- Second reading: 30 April 1997
- Third reading: 5 May 1997

Second chamber: Dewan Negara
- Bill title: Digital Signature Bill 1997
- Bill citation: D.R. 02/1997
- Member(s) in charge: Leo Moggie Irok, Minister of Energy, Telecommunications and Posts
- First reading: 12 May 1997
- Second reading: 3 June 1997
- Third reading: 3 June 1997

Amended by
- Digital Signature (Amendment) Act 2001 [Act A1121]
- Status: In force

The Digital Signature Act 1997 (Malay: Akta Tandatangan Digital 1997), is a Malaysian law enacted to make provision for, and to regulate the use of, digital signatures and to provide for matters connected therewith.

== Structure ==
The Digital Signature Act 1997, in its current form (1 January 2006), consists of 7 Parts containing 92 sections and no schedule (including 1 amendment).

- Part I: Preliminary
- Part II: The Commission and the Licensing of Certification Authorities
- Part III: Requirements of Licensed Certification Authorities
- Part IV: Duties of Licensed Certification Authorities and Subscibers
  - Chapter 1—General requirements for licensed certification authorities
  - Chapter 2—Warrants and obligation of licensed certification authorities
  - Chapter 3—Representation and duties upon acceptance or certificate
  - Chapter 4—Control in private key
  - Chapter 5—Suspension of certificate
  - Chapter 6—Revocation of certificate
  - Chapter 7—Expiration of certificate
  - Chapter 8—Recommended reliance limits and liability
- Part V: Effect of Digital Signature
- Part VI: Repositories and Date/Time Stamp Services
- Part VII: General
