= Excise Act 1976 =

Parliament of Malaysia
- Long title: An Act to amend and consolidate the law relating to excise in Malaysia.
- Citation: Act 176
- Territorial extent: Throughout Malaysia
- Passed by: Dewan Rakyat
- Passed: 14 April 1976
- Passed by: Dewan Negara
- Passed: 4 May 1976
- Royal assent: 21 June 1976
- Commenced: 24 June 1976
- Effective: [1 July 1977, P.U. (B) 351/1977]

Legislative history

First chamber: Dewan Rakyat
- Bill title: Excise Bill 1976
- Introduced by: Richard Ho Ung Hun, Deputy Minister of Finance
- First reading: 31 March 1976
- Second reading: 14 April 1976
- Third reading: 14 April 1976

Second chamber: Dewan Negara
- Bill title: Excise Bill 1976
- Member(s) in charge: Richard Ho Ung Hun, Deputy Minister of Finance
- First reading: [ ]
- Second reading: 4 May 1976
- Third reading: 4 May 1976

Amended by
- Finance Act 1983 [Act 293] Finance (No. 2) Act 1986 [Act 329] Free Zones Act 1990 [Act 438] Excise (Amendment) Act 1990 [Act A781] Finance Act 1991 [Act 451] Excise (Amendment) Act 1994 [Act A874] Excise (Amendment) Act 1995 [Act A922] Excise (Amendment) Act 1999 [Act A1059] Excise (Amendment) Act 2001 [Act A1112] Excise (Amendment) Act 2002 [Act A1164] Excise (Amendment) (No. 2) Act 2002 [Act A1184] Excise (Amendment) Act 2005 [Act A1245]

Related legislation
- Excise Act 1961 [F.M. Act 34 of 1961] Customs (Malaysia Common Tariffs) Act 1966 [Malaysia Act 18 of 1966] Excise Ordinance, 1959 [Sabah Ordinance No. 18 of 1959] Liquors Revenue Ordinance [Sabah Cap. 73] Excise Ordinance [Sarawak Cap. 27]
- Status: In force

The Excise Act 1976 (Malay: Akta Eksais 1976), is an Act of the Parliament of Malaysia. It was enacted to amend and consolidate the law pertaining to excise in Malaysia.

== Structure ==
The Excise Act 1976, in its current form (1 January 2006), consists of 16 Parts containing 92 sections and 1 schedule (including 12 amendments).

- Part I: Preliminary
- Part II: Appointment of Officers
- Part III: Levying of Excise Duties
- Part IV: Manufacture of Dutiable Goods
- Part V: Storage of Dutiable Goods
- Part VI: Petroleum and Petroleum Products
- Part VII: Licensing
- Part VIII: Toddy
- Part VIIIA: General Provisions Affecting Vessels in Territorial Waters
- Part VIIIB: Declaration of Goods
- Part IX: Miscellaneous Provisions
- Part X: Inspection, Investigation, Search, Seizure and Arrest
- Part XI: Provisions as to Trials and Proceedings
- Part XII: Offences and Penalties
- Part XIII: Regulations
- Part XIV: Special Provisions Dealing with Labuan
- Part XV: Special Provisions Dealing with Sabah and Sarawak
- Part XVA: Special Provisions Dealing with Langkawi
- Part XVB: Special Provisions Dealing with Tioman
- Part XVC: Special Provisions Dealing with the Joint Development Area
- Part XVI: Repeal
- Schedule
