= Dangerous Drugs (Forfeiture of Property) Act 1988 =

Parliament of Malaysia
- Long title: An Act to make provisions for offences in relation to property, and for the seizure and forfeiture of property, connected with activity related to offences under this Act, the Dangerous Drugs Act 1952, or any foreign law corresponding to these Acts or to the provisions for offences under these Acts; for assistance to foreign countries in relation to matters connected with dangerous drugs; and for matters connected with the aforesaid provisions.
- Citation: Act 340
- Territorial extent: Throughout Malaysia
- Passed by: Dewan Rakyat
- Passed: 24 March 1988
- Passed by: Dewan Negara
- Passed: 6 April 1988
- Royal assent: 11 May 1988
- Commenced: 9 June 1988
- Effective: 10 June 1988

Legislative history

Initiating chamber: Dewan Rakyat
- Bill title: Dangerous Drugs (Forfeiture of Property) Bill 1988
- Bill citation: D.R. 01/1988
- Introduced by: Megat Junid Megat Ayub, Deputy Minister of Home Affairs
- First reading: 9 March 1988
- Second reading: 23 March 1988
- Third reading: 24 March 1988

Revising chamber: Dewan Negara
- Bill title: Dangerous Drugs (Forfeiture of Property) Bill 1988
- Bill citation: D.R. 01/1988
- Member(s) in charge: Megat Junid Megat Ayub, Deputy Minister of Home Affairs
- First reading: 28 March 1988
- Second reading: 6 April 1988
- Third reading: 6 April 1988
- Status: In force

The Dangerous Drugs (Forfeiture of Property) Act 1988 (Malay: Akta Dadah Berbahaya (Perlucuthakan Harta) 1988), is a Malaysian laws which enacted to make provisions for offences in relation to property, and for the seizure and forfeiture of property, connected with activity related to offences under this Act, the Dangerous Drugs Act 1952, or any foreign law corresponding to these Acts or to the provisions for offences under these Acts; for assistance to foreign countries in relation to matters connected with dangerous drugs; and for matters connected with the aforesaid provisions.

== Preamble ==
Preamble of the Act provides the following considerations:

1. WHEREAS action has been taken and further similar action is being threatened by a substantial body of persons both inside and outside Malaysia—
  1. to organize and carry out trafficking in dangerous drugs, including their importation into and exportation from Malaysia;
  2. to spread the dependence on dangerous drugs among various classes of people in Malaysia, thereby causing widespread detriment to public health, security, safety and morals; and
  3. to acquire property by trafficking in dangerous drugs and to utilize property for such trafficking;
2. AND WHEREAS the action taken and threatened is prejudicial to public order in Malaysia;
3. AND WHEREAS Parliament considers it necessary to stop such action;

== Structure ==
The Dangerous Drugs (Forfeiture of Property) Act 1988, in its current form (1 December 2011), consists of 7 Parts containing 63 sections and 2 schedules (including no amendment).

- Part I: Preliminary
- Part II: Offences in Relation to Property
- Part III: Forfeiture of Property of Liable Persons
- Part IV: Arrest, Investigation and Seizure
- Part V: Forfeiture
- Part VI: Evidence and Procedure
- Part VII: Assistance to a Foreign Country
- Schedules
