= Ministerial Functions Act 1969 =

Act of the Parliament of Malaysia

Parliament of Malaysia
- Long title: An Act to make provisions for declaring the functions and the transfer of functions of Ministers, for declaring the styles and titles of Ministers, and for incidental and connected purposes.
- Citation: Act 2
- Territorial extent: Throughout Malaysia
- Passed by: Dewan Rakyat
- Passed: 11 January 1969
- Passed by: Dewan Negara
- Passed: 27 January 1969
- Royal assent: 15 February 1969
- Commenced: 27 February 1969
- Effective: 27 February 1969

Legislative history

Initiating chamber: Dewan Rakyat
- Bill title: Ministerial Functions Bill 1969
- Introduced by: Khaw Kai Boh, Minister of Housing and Local Government
- First reading: 10 January 1969
- Second reading: 11 January 1969
- Third reading: 11 January 1969

Revising chamber: Dewan Negara
- Bill title: Ministerial Functions Bill 1969
- Member(s) in charge: Abdul Ghafar Baba, Minister without Portfolio
- First reading: 27 January 1969
- Second reading: 27 January 1969
- Third reading: 27 January 1969

Related legislation
- Ministers of the Federal Government (Transfer of Functions) Ordinance 1951 [No. 15 of 1951]

Keywords
- Ministerial function
- Status: In force

The Ministerial Functions Act 1969 (Malay: Akta Fungsi-fungsi Menteri 1969), is a Malaysian laws which enacted to make provisions for declaring the functions and the transfer of functions of Ministers, for declaring the styles and titles of Ministers, and for incidental and connected purposes.

== Structure ==
The Ministerial Functions Act 1969, in its current form (1 June 2013), consists of only 5 sections and no schedule (including no amendment), without separate Part.

- Section 1: Short title
- Section 2: Functions, styles and titles of Ministers
- Section 3: Effect of transfer of functions and change of style and title
- Section 4: Reference in written laws
- Section 5: Repeal and saving
