= Solid Waste and Public Cleansing Management Act 2007 =

Parliament of Malaysia
- Long title: An Act to provide for and regulate the management of controlled solid waste and public cleansing for the purpose of maintaining proper sanitation and for matters incidental thereto.
- Citation: Act 672
- Territorial extent: Throughout Malaysia
- Passed by: Dewan Rakyat
- Passed: 4 July 2007
- Passed by: Dewan Negara
- Passed: 17 July 2007
- Royal assent: 29 August 2007
- Commenced: 30 August 2007
- Effective: Perlis, Kedah, Pahang, Federal Territory of Kuala Lumpur, Federal Territory of Putrajaya, Negeri Sembilan, Malacca, Johor–1 June 2016

Legislative history

First chamber: Dewan Rakyat
- Bill title: Solid Waste and Public Cleansing Management Bill 2007
- Bill citation: D.R. 25/2007
- Introduced by: Ong Ka Ting, Minister of Housing and Local Government
- First reading: 26 June 2007
- Second reading: 2 July 2007
- Third reading: 3 July 2007

Second chamber: Dewan Negara
- Bill title: Solid Waste and Public Cleansing Management Bill 2007
- Bill citation: D.R. 25/2007
- Member(s) in charge: Ong Ka Ting, Minister of Housing and Local Government
- First reading: 11 July 2007
- Second reading: 17 July 2007
- Third reading: 17 July 2007
- Status: In force

The Solid Waste and Public Cleansing Management Act 2007 (Malay: Akta Pengurusan Sisa Pepejal dan Pembersihan Awam 2007) is an Act of the Parliament of Malaysia. It was enacted to provide for and regulate the management of controlled solid waste and public cleansing for the purpose of maintaining proper sanitation and for matters incidental thereto.

== Preamble ==
1. WHEREAS sanitation is a matter within the Concurrent List in the Ninth Schedule to the Federal Constitution:
2. AND WHEREAS matters relating to the management of controlled solid waste and public cleansing are now administered by the various local authorities:
3. AND WHEREAS it is expedient for the purpose of ensuring uniformity of law and policy to make a law for the proper control and regulation of matters relating to the management of controlled solid waste and public cleansing throughout Peninsular Malaysia and the Federal Territories of Putrajaya and Labuan:
4. AND WHEREAS it is also expedient that provisions be made to confer executive authority on the Federation for matters relating to the management of controlled solid waste and public cleansing throughout Peninsular Malaysia and the Federal Territories of Putrajaya and Labuan:

== Structure ==
The Solid Waste and Public Cleansing Management Act 2007, in its current form (30 January 2007), consists of 12 Parts containing 112 sections and no schedule (including no amendment).

- Part I: Preliminary
- Part II: Administration
- Part III: Approval for the Construction, Alteration or Closure of Prescribed Solid Waste Management Facilities
- Part IV: Licensing Provisions
- Part V: Charges
- Part VI: Tribunal for Solid Waste Management Services
- Part VII: Assumption of Control
- Part VIII: Control of Solid Waste Generators and Persons in Possession of Controlled Solid Waste
- Part IX: Enforcement Provisions
- Part X: Reduction and Recovery of Controlled Solid Waste
- Part XI: General
- Part XII: Savings and Transitional
