= Development Financial Institutions Act 2002 =

Parliament of Malaysia
- Long title: An Act to make provisions for the regulation and supervision of development financial institutions and for matters connected therewith.
- Citation: Act 618
- Territorial extent: Throughout Malaysia
- Passed by: Dewan Rakyat
- Passed: 11 December 2001
- Passed by: Dewan Negara
- Passed: 13 December 2001
- Royal assent: 29 January 2002
- Commenced: 7 February 2002
- Effective: [15 February 2002, P.U. (B) 51/2002]

Legislative history

First chamber: Dewan Rakyat
- Bill title: Development Financial Institutions Bill 2001
- Bill citation: D.R. 48/2001
- Introduced by: Shafie Salleh, Deputy Minister of Finance
- First reading: 3 December 2001
- Second reading: 11 December 2001
- Third reading: 11 December 2001

Second chamber: Dewan Negara
- Bill title: Development Financial Institutions Bill 2001
- Bill citation: D.R. 48/2001
- Member(s) in charge: Shafie Salleh, Deputy Minister of Finance
- First reading: 12 December 2001
- Second reading: 13 December 2001
- Third reading: 13 December 2001

Amended by
- Development Financial Institutions (Amendment of Schedule) Order 2007 [P.U. (A) 285/2007]

Related legislation
- Banking and Financial Institutions Act 1989 [Act 372] Bank Kerjasama Rakyat Malaysia Berhad (Special Provisions) Act 1978 [Act 202] Companies Act 1965 [Act 125] Co-operative Societies Act 1993 [Act 502]
- Status: In force

The Development Financial Institutions Act 2002 (Malay: Akta Institusi Kewangan Pembangunan 2002), is a Malaysian law which enacted to make provisions for the regulation and supervision of development financial institutions and for matters connected therewith.

== Structure ==
The Development Financial Institutions Act 2002, in its current form (1 October 2008), consists of nine Parts containing 130 sections and one schedule (including one amendment).

- Part I: Preliminary
- Part II: Management, Ownership and Control
- Part III: Restrictions on Business
- Part IV: Obligations and Sourcing of Funds
- Part V: Dealings with Government Funds
- Part VI: Control of Defaulter
- Part VII: Auditor and Accounts
- Part VIII: Examination and Investigation
- Part IX: Miscellaneous
- Schedule
