= Destitute Persons Act 1977 =

Malaysian law on beggars and homeless people

Parliament of Malaysia
- Long title: An Act to provide for the care and rehabilitation of destitute persons and for the control of vagrancy.
- Citation: Act 183
- Territorial extent: Throughout Malaysia
- Passed by: Dewan Rakyat
- Passed: 16 December 1976
- Passed by: Dewan Negara
- Passed: 14 January 1977
- Royal assent: 3 March 1977
- Commenced: 15 November 1977 — Peninsular Malaysia; 27 January 1995 — Sarawak; 26 March 2012 — Sabah

Legislative history

First chamber: Dewan Rakyat
- Bill title: Destitute Persons Bill 1976
- Introduced by: Sulaiman Daud, Deputy Minister of Lands and Regional Development
- First reading: 24 November 1976
- Second reading: 15 December - 16 December 1976
- Third reading: 16 December 1976

Second chamber: Dewan Negara
- Bill title: Destitute Persons Bill 1976
- Member(s) in charge: Aishah Ghani, Minister of General Welfare
- First reading: 17 December 1977
- Second reading: 14 January 1977
- Third reading: 14 January 1977

Repeals
- Vagrants Act 1965 [Act 19 of 1965]

Amended by
- Destitute Persons (Amendment) Act 1977 [Act A404] Destitute Persons (Amendment) Act 1985 [Act A638]

Keywords
- Beggars, homelessness, poverty, social welfare, vagrancy
- Status: In force

Destitute Persons Act 1977 (Malay: Akta Orang-Orang Papa 1977) is a Malaysian law that governs the care, rehabilitation and control of beggars and homeless persons. Under this Act, a beggar or homeless person may be placed into a welfare home for up to three years by the Social Welfare Department, after receiving approval from a magistrate, and such placement may be extended by the magistrate for another three years.

It replaced the Vagrants Act 1965, which previously criminalised the act of begging in public and beggars can only be placed into a welfare home if they were arrested by the police and subsequently found guilty by a court. With the introduction of this Act, the act of begging alone is no longer a crime, but resisting placement or escaping welfare home are.

== Legal provisions ==
=== Detention ===
Under section 3, social welfare officers or other government officers authorised by the Social Welfare Department and local authorities may detain any beggar or homeless person found in public and produce him before a magistrate within 24 hours. If the beggar or homeless person refuse or ressist, such officers can request the help of police officers to detain him.

If the magistrate reasonably believes the detained person is a "destitute person", a detention order will be issued and the person will be temporary placed in a welfare home for up to one month awaiting a report by the social welfare department.

After receiving the report, if the magistrate is statisfied that the person is indeed a destitute person, he may order such person to be placed in a welfare home for up to three years, and the detention period may be further extended by another three years.

However, children under 18 years old cannot be detained under section 3, but any destitute person may voluntarily admit himself into a welfare home as per section 4.

=== Release ===
Under section 8, a destitute person can be discharged from a welfare home if he has found a suitable employment to sustain himself, or if someone else is willing to provide care and support to him. The Minister of Women, Family and Community Development may also reduce the detention period or allow the early release of a destitute person on special grounds as per section 13. Person discharged from the welfare home will then be placed under a one-year supervision period by a social welfare officer.

=== Criminal offences ===
Under section 11, any destitute person who refuse, resist or escape from being taken into a welfare home; or leave his welfare home without permission; or failed to return to his welfare home within the designated time, commits an offence and can either be sentenced to up to three months imprisonment or be returned to welfare home without punishment.

== See also ==
- Anti-homelessness legislation
- Begging
- Homelessness
- Vagrancy
