= Telemedicine Act 1997 =

Parliament of Malaysia
- Long title: An Act to provide for the regulation and control of the practice of telemedicine; and for matters connected therewith.
- Citation: Act 564
- Territorial extent: Throughout Malaysia
- Passed by: Dewan Rakyat
- Passed: 7 May 1997
- Passed by: Dewan Negara
- Passed: 3 June 1997
- Royal assent: 18 June 1997
- Commenced: 30 June 1997

Legislative history

First chamber: Dewan Rakyat
- Bill title: Telemedicine Bill 1997
- Bill citation: D.R. 11/1997
- Introduced by: Siti Zaharah Sulaiman, Deputy Minister of Health
- First reading: 10 April 1997
- Second reading: 5 May 1997
- Third reading: 7 May 1997

Second chamber: Dewan Negara
- Bill title: Telemedicine Bill 1997
- Bill citation: D.R. 11/1997
- Member(s) in charge: M. Mahalingam, Parliamentary Secretary to the Minister of Health
- First reading: 12 May 1997
- Second reading: 3 June 1997
- Third reading: 3 June 1997

Keywords
- Telemedicine
- Status: Not yet in force

The Telemedicine Act 1997 (Malay: Akta Teleperubatan 1997), is a Malaysian law enacted to provide for the regulation and control of the practice of telemedicine and for matters connected therewith.

== Structure ==
The Telemedicine Act 1997, in its current form (30 June 1997), consists of 6 sections and no schedule (including no amendment), without separate Part.

- Section 1: Short title and commencement
- Section 2: Interpretation
- Section 3: Persons who may practise telemedicine
- Section 4: Certificate to practise telemedicine
- Section 5: Patient's consent
- Section 6: Regulations
