= Postal Services Act 2012 =

Parliament of Malaysia
- Long title: An Act to provide for the licensing of postal services and the regulation of the postal services industry, and for incidental or connected matters.
- Citation: Act 741
- Territorial extent: Throughout Malaysia
- Passed by: Dewan Rakyat
- Passed: 6 October 2011
- Passed by: Dewan Negara
- Passed: 21 December 2011
- Royal assent: 2 February 2012
- Commenced: 9 February 2012
- Effective: [1 April 2013, P.U. (B) 94/2013]

Legislative history

Initiating chamber: Dewan Rakyat
- Bill title: Postal Services Bill 2011
- Bill citation: D.R. 26/2011
- Introduced by: Rais Yatim, Minister of Information, Communications and Culture
- First reading: 3 October 2011
- Second reading: 6 October 2011
- Third reading: 6 October 2011

Revising chamber: Dewan Negara
- Bill title: Postal Services Bill 2011
- Bill citation: D.R. 26/2011
- Member(s) in charge: Joseph Salang Gandum, Deputy Minister of Information, Communications and Culture
- First reading: 7 December 2011
- Second reading: 21 December 2011
- Third reading: 21 December 2011

Related legislation
- Postal Services Act 1991 [Act 465]
- Status: In force

The Postal Services Act 2012 (Malay: Akta Perkhidmatan Pos 2012), is a Malaysian laws which enacted to provide for the licensing of postal services and the regulation of the postal services industry, and for incidental or connected matters.

== Structure ==
The Postal Services Act 2012, in its current form (9 February 2012), consists of 17 Parts containing 112 sections and 2 schedules (including no amendment).

- Part I: Preliminary
- Part II: Functions of the Commission
- Part III: Ministerial Powers and Procedures
- Part IV: Licensing Provision
- Part V: Provisions Relating to the Universal Service Licensee
- Part VI: General Terms and Conditions of Postal Services
- Part VII: Other Services
- Part VIII: Regulation of Rates
- Part IX: General Competition Practices
- Part X: Consumer Protection
- Part XI: Postcode and Addressing System and Postal Identifiers
- Part XII: Powers and Procedures of the Malaysian Communications and Multimedia Commission
  - Chapter 1: Directions
  - Chapter 2: Inquiry
  - Chapter 3: Investigation
- Part XIII: Offences and Penalties
- Part XIV: Information Gathering Powers and Enforcement Provisions
  - Chapter 1: Information gathering powers
  - Chapter 2: Enforcement powers of authorized officer
  - Chapter 3: Miscellaneous
- Part XV: General
- Part XVI: National Interest Matters
- Part XVII: Savings and Transitional
- Schedules

== See also ==
- Postal Services Act
