= Anti-Personnel Mines Convention Implementation Act 2000 =

Parliament of Malaysia
- Long title: An Act to implement the Convention on the Prohibition of the Use, Stockpiling, Production and Transfer of Anti-Personnel Mines and on their Destruction; and for other matters connected therewith.
- Citation: Act 603
- Territorial extent: Throughout Malaysia
- Passed by: Dewan Rakyat
- Passed: 20 April 2000
- Passed by: Dewan Negara
- Passed: 10 May 2000
- Royal assent: 30 May 2000
- Commenced: 15 June 2000
- Effective: 1 October 1999

Legislative history

Initiating chamber: Dewan Rakyat
- Bill title: Anti-Personnel Mines Convention Implementation Bill 2000
- Bill citation: D.R. 12/2000
- Introduced by: Shafie Apdal, Deputy Minister of Defence
- First reading: 7 March 2000
- Second reading: 20 April 2000
- Third reading: 20 April 2000

Revising chamber: Dewan Negara
- Bill title: Anti-Personnel Mines Convention Implementation Bill 2000
- Bill citation: D.R. 12/2000
- Member(s) in charge: Shafie Apdal, Deputy Minister of Defence
- First reading: 24 April 2000
- Second reading: 10 May 2000
- Third reading: 10 May 2000
- Status: In force

The Anti-Personnel Mines Convention Implementation Act 2000 (Malay: Akta Penguatkuasaan Konvensyen Periuk Api Pembinasa Anggota 2000) is an Act of the Parliament of Malaysia. It was enacted to implement the Convention on the Prohibition of the Use, Stockpiling, Production and Transfer of Anti-Personnel Mines and on their Destruction; and for other matters connected therewith.

== Preamble ==
1. WHEREAS according to Article 17 of the Convention on the Prohibition of the Use, Stockpiling, Production and Transfer of Anti-Personnel Mines and on their Destruction ---
  1. "1. This Convention shall enter into force on the first day of the sixth month after the month in which the 40th Instrument of ratification, acceptance, approval or accession has been deposited.
  2. 2. For any State which deposits its instrument of ratification, acceptance, approval or accession after the date of the deposit of the 40th instrument of ratification, acceptance, approval or accession, this Convention shall enter into force on the first day of the sixth month after the date on which that State has deposited its instrument of ratification, acceptance, approval or accession.":
2. AND WHEREAS the said 40th instrument of ratification was so deposited by Burkina Faso on the sixteenth day of September 1998 and the Convention therefore entered into force on the first day of March 1999:
3. AND WHEREAS Malaysia deposited her instrument of accession on the twenty-second day of April 1999 and therefore in accordance with the said Article 17 the Convention entered into force as far as Malaysia is concerned on the first day of October 1999;

== Structure ==
The Anti-Personnel Mines Convention Implementation Act 2000, in its current form (11 December 2025), consists of 24 sections and no schedule (including no amendment), without separate Part.
