= Age of Majority Act 1971 =

Malaysian law

Parliament of Malaysia
- Long title: An Act to amend and consolidate the law relating to the age of majority.
- Citation: Act 21
- Territorial extent: Throughout Malaysia
- Passed by: Dewan Rakyat
- Passed: 17 March 1971
- Passed by: Dewan Negara
- Passed: 26 March 1971
- Royal assent: 22 April 1971
- Commenced: 29 April 1971
- Effective: 30 April 1971

Legislative history

Initiating chamber: Dewan Rakyat
- Bill title: Age of Majority Bill 1971
- Introduced by: Abdul Kadir Yusuf, Attorney General
- First reading: 9 March 1971
- Second reading: 17 March 1971
- Third reading: 17 March 1971

Revising chamber: Dewan Negara
- Bill title: Age of Majority Bill 1971
- Member(s) in charge: Abdul Kadir Yusuf, Attorney General
- First reading: 22 March 1971
- Second reading: 26 March 1971
- Third reading: 26 March 1971

Repeals
- Age of Majority Act 1961 [Act 9 of 1961] Subsection 2(1) of the Interpretation Ordinance of Sabah [Cap. 63] Subsection 3(1) of the Interpretation and General Clauses Enactment 1963 of Sabah [En. 34 of 1963] Subsection 3(1) of the Interpretation Ordinance of Sarawak [Cap. 1]

Keywords
- Age of majority
- Status: In force

The Age of Majority Act 1971 (Malay: Akta Umur Dewasa 1971), is a Malaysian law which was enacted to amend and consolidate the laws relating to the age of majority.

According to the Act, the age of majority is 18 years old, so that below than 18 years old is considered as minor. The age of majority should not be confused with other types of ages (e.g. voting age, marriageable age, age of consent, legal working age, school leaving age, legal driving age, smoking age, legal drinking age, age of criminal responsibility, age of candidacy for political offices, etc.) because different ages are set for these types of ages.

Nothing in this Act shall affect:

(a) the capacity of any person to act in the following matters, namely, marriage, divorce, dower and adoption;

(b) the religion and religious rites and usages of any class of persons within Malaysia;

(c) any provision in any other written law contained fixing the age of majority for the purposes of that written law.

== Structure ==
The Age of Majority Act 1971, in its current form (1 January 2006), consists of only 5 sections and 1 schedule (including no amendment), without separate Parts.

- Section 1: Short title
- Section 2: Age of majority
- Section 3: Interpretation
- Section 4: Savings
- Section 5: Repeal
- Schedule
