= Direct Sales and Anti-Pyramid Scheme Act 1993 =

Malaysian law

Parliament of Malaysia
- Long title: An Act to provide for the licensing of persons carrying on direct sales business, for the regulation of direct selling, for prohibiting pyramid scheme or arrangement, chain distribution scheme or arrangement, or any similar scheme or arrangement, and for other matters connected therewith.
- Citation: Act 500
- Territorial extent: Throughout Malaysia
- Passed by: Dewan Rakyat
- Passed: 20 October 1992
- Enacted by: Dewan Negara
- Royal assent: 22 January 1993
- Commenced: 4 February 1993
- Effective: [1 June 1993, P.U. (B) 152/1993]

Legislative history

First chamber: Dewan Rakyat
- Bill title: Direct Sales Bill 1992
- Bill citation: D.R. 20/1992
- Introduced by: Abu Hassan Omar, Minister of Domestic Trade and Consumer Affairs
- First reading: 22 July 1992
- Second reading: 19 October 1992
- Third reading: 20 October 1992

Second chamber: Dewan Negara
- Bill title: Direct Sales Bill 1992
- Bill citation: D.R. 20/1992
- Member(s) in charge: , Minister of
- First reading: 16 December 1992
- Second reading: [ ]
- Third reading: [ ]

Amended by
- Direct Sales (Amendment) Act 2010 [Act A1379]
- Status: In force

The Direct Sales and Anti-Pyramid Scheme Act 1993 (Malay: Akta Jualan Langsung dan Skim Anti-Piramid 1993), is a Malaysian laws which enacted to provide for the licensing of persons carrying on direct sales business, for the regulation of direct selling, for prohibiting pyramid scheme or arrangement, chain distribution scheme or arrangement, or any similar scheme or arrangement, and for other matters connected therewith.

== Structure ==
The Direct Sales and Anti-Pyramid Scheme Act 1993, in its current form (1 December 2011), consists of 7 Parts containing 45 sections and 1 schedule (including 1 amendment).

- Part I: Preliminary
- Part II: Requirement for a Licence to Carry on Direct Sales Business
- Part III: Door-to-door Sales and, Mail Order Sales and Sales through Electronic Transactions
- Part IV: Direct Sales Contracts
- Part V: Cooling-off Period and Rescission
- Part VA: Prohibition of Pyramid Scheme
- Part VI: Enforcement
- Part VII: Miscellaneous
- Schedule
