= Interpretation Acts 1948 and 1967 =

- Long title: An Act to provide for the commencement, application, construction, interpretation and operation of written laws; to provide for matters in relation to the exercise of statutory powers and duties; and for matters connected therewith.
- Citation: Act 388
- Territorial extent: Throughout Malaysia
- Enacted: 1948 and 1967 (M.U. Ordinance No. 7 of 1948, Act No. 23 of 1967 and Act No. 57 of 1967); Consolidated and Revised: 1989 (Act 388 w.e.f. 19 October 1989)
- Effective: Part I—18 May 1967, P.U. (A) 204/1967; Part II—31 January 1948; Part III—30 September 1967

Amended by
- Part I Interpretation (Amendment) Act 1968 [Act 40/1968] Constitution (Amendment) (No 2) Act 1971 [Act A31] Malaysian Currency (Ringgit) Act 1975 [Act 160] Constitution (Amendment) Act 1976 [Act A354] Malaysian Standard Time Act 1981 [Act 261] Interpretation (Amendment) Act 1997 [Act A996] ---- Part II; Interpretation and General Clauses (Amendment) Ordinance 1949 [F.M. Ord. No. 56/1949] Interpretation and General Clauses (Amendment) Ordinance 1953 [F.M. Ord. No. 41/1953] Crown Agents (Change of Title) Ordinance 1954 [F.M. Ord. No. 32/1954] Federal Constitution (Modification of Laws) (Interpretation and General Clauses Ordinance) Order 1957 [L.N. (N.S.) 2/1957] Federal Constitution (Modification of Laws) (Interpretation and General Clauses Ordinance) Order 1958 [L.N. 334/1958] State of Singapore Ordinance 1959 [F.M. Ord. 18/1959] Interpretation and General Clauses (Amendment) Act 1962 [Act 17/1962] Constitution (Amendment) Act 1963 [Act 25/1963] Courts of Judicature Act 1964 [Act 7/1964] Interpretation Act 1967 [Act 23/1967] Courts of Judicature Act 1964 [Act 91] Malaysian Currency (Ringgit) Act 1975 [Act 160] Malaysian Standard Time Act 1981 [Act 261] ---- Part III; Revision of Laws (Rectification of Interpretation Acts 1948 and 1967) Order 1999 [P.U. (A) 102/1999]

Related legislation
- Interpretation and General Clauses Ordinance 1948 [M.U. Ordinance No. 7 of 1948] Interpretation Ordinance [Straits Settlements Cap. 2] Interpretation and General Clauses Enactment [Federated Malay States Cap. 1] Interpretation and General Clauses Enactment [Johore Enactment No. 2] Interpretation Enactment [Kedah Enactment No. 53] Interpretation Enactment [Terengganu Enactment No. 8 of 1356] Interpretation and General Clauses Enactment [Kelantan Enactment No. 12 of 1938] Transfer of Powers and Interpretation Ordinance 1946 [Malayan Union Ordinance No. 2 of 1946]

Keywords
- Interpretation
- Status: In force

The Interpretation Acts 1948 and 1967 (Malay: Akta Tafsiran 1948 dan 1967) is a Malaysian law which enacted to provide for the commencement, application, construction, interpretation and operation of written laws; to provide for matters in relation to the exercise of statutory powers and duties; and for matters connected therewith.

== Structure ==
The Interpretation Acts 1948 and 1967, in its current form (1 January 2006), consists of 3 Parts containing 15 divisions, 132 sections and 2 schedules (including 18 amendments).

- Part I
  - Division One: Meaning of Certain Expressions and References
  - Division Two: Provisions Affecting Written Laws Generally
  - Division Three: Powers and Appointments
  - Division Four: Miscellaneous
- Part II
  - Division Five: Definitions
  - Division Six: General Provisions Regarding Acts of Parliament, Ordinances and Enactments
  - Division Seven: Repeal, Re-enactment and Amending Legislation
  - Division Eight: Imperial Acts
  - Division Nine: Subsidiary Legislation
  - Division Ten: Powers and Appointments
  - Division Eleven: Distance and Time
  - Division Twelve: Miscellaneous
  - Division Thirteen: Reprint of Written Laws
  - Division Fourteen: Penal Provisions
  - Division Fifteen: Repeal
- Part III
- Schedules

== See also ==
- Interpretation Act
