= Anti-Trafficking in Persons and Anti-Smuggling of Migrants Act 2007 =

Act of the Parliament of Malaysia

Parliament of Malaysia
- Long title: An Act to prevent and combat trafficking in persons and smuggling of migrants and to provide for matters connected therewith.
- Citation: Act 670
- Territorial extent: Throughout Malaysia
- Enacted by: Dewan Rakyat
- Enacted by: Dewan Negara
- Royal assent: 18 July 2007
- Commenced: 26 July 2007
- Effective: [Part 1, II, Section 66 and 67–1 October 2007, [P.U. (B) 339/2007; Part III, IV, V and VI–28 February 2008, P.U. (B) 86/2008]

Legislative history

First chamber: Dewan Rakyat
- Bill title: Anti-Trafficking in Persons Bill 2007
- Introduced by: [[]], Minister of
- First reading: [ ]
- Second reading: [ ]
- Third reading: [ ]

Second chamber: Dewan Negara
- Bill title: Anti-Trafficking in Persons Bill 2007
- Member(s) in charge: [[]], Minister of
- First reading: [ ]
- Second reading: [ ]
- Third reading: [ ]

Amended by
- Anti-Trafficking in Persons (Amendment) Act 2010 [Act A1385]
- Status: In force

The Anti-Trafficking in Persons and Anti-Smuggling of Migrants Act 2007 (Malay: Akta Antipemerdagangan Orang dan Antipenyeludupan Migran 2007) is an Act of the Parliament of Malaysia. It was enacted to prevent and combat trafficking in persons and smuggling of migrants and to provide for matters connected therewith.

== Structure ==
The Anti-Trafficking in Persons and Anti-Smuggling of Migrants Act 2007, in its current form (1 November 2014), consists of 6 Parts containing 67 sections and no schedule (including 1 amendment).

- Part I: Preliminary
- Part II: Council for Anti-Trafficking in Persons and Anti-Smuggling of Migrants
- Part III: Trafficking in Persons Offences, Immunity, etc.
- Part IIIA: Smuggling of Migrants
- Part IV: Enforcement
- Part V: Care and Protection of Trafficked Persons
- Part VI: Miscellaneous
