= Malaysian Agricultural Research and Development Institute Act 1969 =

Parliament of Malaysia
- Long title: An Act to establish the Malaysian Agricultural Research and Development Institute and for matters connected with it.
- Citation: Act 11
- Territorial extent: Throughout Malaysia
- Passed by: Dewan Rakyat
- Passed: 13 February 1969
- Passed by: Dewan Negara
- Passed: 26 February 1969
- Royal assent: 22 April 1969
- Commenced: 1 May 1969
- Effective: 2 May 1969

Legislative history

First chamber: Dewan Rakyat
- Bill title: Malaysian Agricultural Research and Development Institute Bill 1969
- Introduced by: Mohamed Ghazali Jawi, Minister of Agriculture and Co-operatives
- First reading: 5 February 1969
- Second reading: 13 February 1969
- Third reading: 13 February 1969

Second chamber: Dewan Negara
- Bill title: Malaysian Agricultural Research and Development Institute Bill 1969
- Member(s) in charge: Abdul Ghafar Baba, Minister without Portfolio
- First reading: 24 February 1969
- Second reading: 26 February 1969
- Third reading: 26 February 1969

Amended by
- Malaysian Agricultural Research and Development Institute (Amendment) Act 1973 [Act A203] Malaysian Agricultural Research and Development Institute (Amendment) Act 1977 [Act A374] Palm Oil Research and Development Act 1979 [Act 218] Malaysian Cocoa Board (Incorporation) Act 1988 [Act 343] Malaysian Agricultural Research and Development Institute (Amendment) Act 1990 [Act A757] Malaysian Agricultural Research and Development Institute (Amendment) Act 1990 [Act A785] Revocation of Exemption From Payment of Stamp Duties Act 1992 [Act 478] Malaysian Agricultural Research and Development Institute (Amendment) Act 1999 [Act A1054] Malaysian Cocoa Board (Incorporation) (Amendment) Act 2001 [Act A1103] Malaysian Agricultural Research and Development Institute (Amendment) Act 2002 [Act A1160] Ministers of the Federal Government (No. 2) Order 2004 [P.U.(A) 206/2004]

Keywords
- Malaysian Agricultural Research and Development Institute, agricultural research
- Status: In force

The Malaysian Agricultural Research and Development Institute Act 1969 (Malay: Akta Institut Penyelidikan dan Kemajuan Pertanian Malaysia 1969), is an Act of the Parliament of Malaysia. It was enacted to establish the Malaysian Agricultural Research and Development Institute and for matters connected with it.

== Structure ==
The Malaysian Agricultural Research and Development Institute Act 1969, in its current form (1 January 2006), consists of 6 Parts containing 25 sections and 1 schedule (including 11 amendments).

- Part I: Preliminary
- Part II: The Institute
- Part III: The Board
- Part IV: The Scientific Council
- Part V: The Fund and Accounts
- Part VI: Supplemental
- Schedule
