= Anti-Money Laundering, Anti-Terrorism Financing and Proceeds of Unlawful Activities Act 2001 =

Malaysian law

Anti-Money Laundering, Anti-Terrorism Financing, Anti-Restricted Activity Financing and Proceeds of Unlawful Activities Act 2001

Parliament of Malaysia
- Long title: An Act to provide for the offences of money launderin and restricted activity financing including the proliferation of weapons of mass destruction, the measures to be taken for the prevention of money laundering, terrorism financing and restricted activity financing offences and to provide for the forfeiture of property involved in or derived from money laundering, terrorism financing and restricted activity financing offences, as well as terrorist property and proliferator property, proceeds of an unlawful activity and instrumentalities of an offence, and for matters incidental thereto and connected therewith.
- Citation: Act 613
- Territorial extent: Throughout Malaysia
- Passed by: Dewan Rakyat
- Passed: 10 May 2001
- Passed by: Dewan Negara
- Passed: 6 June 2001
- Royal assent: 25 June 2001
- Commenced: 5 July 2001
- Effective: [15 January 2002, P.U. (B) 15/2002]

Legislative history

Initiating chamber: Dewan Rakyat
- Bill title: Anti-Money Laundering Bill 2001
- Bill citation: D.R. 15/2001
- Introduced by: Shafie Salleh, Deputy Minister of Finance
- First reading: 9 April 2001
- Second reading: 9 May 2001
- Third reading: 10 May 2001

Revising chamber: Dewan Negara
- Bill title: Anti-Money Laundering Bill 2001
- Bill citation: D.R. 15/2001
- Member(s) in charge: Shafie Salleh, Deputy Minister of Finance
- First reading: 14 May 2001
- Second reading: 5 June 2001
- Third reading: 6 June 2001

Amended by
- Anti-Money Laundering (Amendment of Second Schedule) Order 2002 [P.U. (A) 18/2002] Anti-Money Laundering (Amendment of First Schedule) Order 2003 [P.U. (A) 13/2003] Anti-Money Laundering (Amendment of Second Schedule) Order 2003 [P.U. (A) 14/2003] Anti-Money Laundering (Amendment of First Schedule) Order 2004 [P.U. (A) 338/2004] Anti-Money Laundering (Amendment of Second Schedule) Order 2004 [P.U. (A) 339/2004] Anti-Money Laundering (Amendment of First Schedule) Order 2005 [P.U. (A) 111/2005] Anti-Money Laundering (Amendment of Second Schedule) Order 2005 [P.U. (A) 112/2005] Anti-Money Laundering (Amendment of First Schedule) (No. 2) Order 2005 [P.U. (A) 416/2005] Anti-Money Laundering (Amendment of Second Schedule) (No 2) Order 2005 [P.U. (A) 417/2005] Anti-Money Laundering (Amendment of First Schedule) Order 2006 [P.U. (A) 292/2006] Anti-Money Laundering and Anti-Terrorism Financing (Amendment) Act 2003 [Act A1208] Anti-Money Laundering and Anti-Terrorism Financing (Amendment of First Schedule) Order 2007 [P.U. (A) 101/2007] Anti-Money Laundering and Anti-Terrorism Financing (Amendment of Second Schedule) Order 2007 [P.U. (A) 102/2007] Anti-Money Laundering and Anti-Terrorism Financing (Amendment of Second Schedule) (No. 2) Order 2007 [P.U. (A) 105/2007] Anti-Money Laundering and Anti-Terrorism Financing (Amendment of Second Schedule) (No. 3) Order 2007 [P.U. (A) 385/2007] Anti-Money Laundering and Anti-Terrorism Financing (Amendment of First Schedule) (No. 2) Order 2007 [P.U. (A) 435/2007] Anti-Money Laundering and Anti-Terrorism Financing (Amendment of Second Schedule) Order 2009 [P.U. (A) 327/2009] Anti-Money Laundering and Anti-Terrorism Financing (Amendment of Second Schedule) (No.2) Order 2009 [P.U. (A) 400/2009] Anti-Money Laundering and Anti-Terrorism Financing (Amendment of Second Schedule) Order 2010 [P.U. (A) 343/2010] Anti-Money Laundering and Anti-Terrorism Financing (Amendment of First Schedule) Order 2010 [P.U. (A) 402/2010] Anti-Money Laundering and Anti-Terrorism Financing (Amendment of Second Schedule) Order 2011 [P.U. (A) 153/2011] Anti-Money Laundering and Anti-Terrorism Financing (Amendment of Second Schedule) Order 2012 [P.U. (A) 144/2012] Anti-Money Laundering and Anti-Terrorism Financing (Amendment of Second Schedule) Order 2014 [P.U. (A) 143/2014] Anti-Money Laundering and Anti-Terrorism Financing (Invocation of Part IV) Order 2014 [P.U. (A) 144/2014] Anti-Money Laundering and Anti-Terrorism Financing (Amendment) Act 2014 [Act A1467] Anti-Money Laundering, Anti-Terrorism Financing and Proceeds of Unlawful Activities (Amendment of First Schedule) Order 2014 [P.U. (A) 291/2014] Anti-Money Laundering, Anti-Terrorism Financing and Proceeds of Unlawful Activities (Amendment of Second Schedule) Order 2014 [P.U. (A) 294/2014]
- Status: In force

The Anti-Money Laundering, Anti-Terrorism Financing, Anti-Restricted Activity Financing and Proceeds of Unlawful Activities Act 2001 (Note: Malay: Akta Pencegahan Pengubahan Wang Haram, Pencegahan Pembiayaan Keganasan, Pencegahan Pembiayaan Aktiviti Terhad dan Hasil daripada Aktiviti Haram 2001) (Note: First enacted as Anti-Money Laundering Act 2001, later renamed as Anti-Money Laundering and Anti-Terrorism Financing Act 2001 by an amendment passed in 2003, with effect from 2007. It was then renamed as Anti-Money Laundering, Anti-Terrorism Financing and Proceeds of Unlawful Activities Act 2001 in 2014. The final change to the present name took place in 2026, by an amendment passed in 2025.) (abbreviated AMLA or AMLATFARAFPUAA) is a Malaysian law to counter and suppress money laundering, financing of terrorism activities or unlawful activities, and other financial-related crimes.

It was enacted to provide for the offence of money laundering, the measures to be taken for the prevention of money laundering and terrorism financing offences and to provide for the forfeiture of property involved in or derived from money laundering and terrorism financing offences, as well as terrorist property, proceeds of an unlawful activity and instrumentalities of an offence.

The Act also laid down the investigative, enforcement and regulatory powers of the relevant enforcement agencies in Malaysia over financial crimes, and the obligations of financial institutions to report suspecious activities and to adhere to government instructions.

== Structure ==
The Act, in its current form as of 1 July 2022, consists of 9 Parts containing 120 sections and 2 schedules (including 27 new sections added since 2001).

- Part I: Preliminary
- Part II: Money Laundering Offences
- Part III: Financial Intelligence
- Part IV: Reporting Obligations
- Part IVA: Cross Border Movements of Cash and Bearer Negotiable Instruments
- Part V: Investigation
- Part VI: Freezing, Seizure and Forfeiture
- Part VIA: Suppression of Terrorism Financing Offences and Freezing, Seizure and Forfeiture of Terrorist Property
- Part VII: Miscellaneous
- Schedules
