= List of acts of the Parliament of Malaysia by citation number =

The following is a list of acts of the Parliament of Malaysia by citation number. The list includes all principal laws of Malaysia enacted after 1969 and pre-1969 laws which have been revised by the Commissioner of Law Revision under the authority of the Revision of Laws Act 1968.

Repealed acts and acts not yet in force are stricken through.

== List ==
=== 1 – 100 ===
2nd Parliament of Malaysia (Total: 12)

- Revision of Laws Act 1968 [Act 1]
- Ministerial Functions Act 1969 [Act 2]
- Civil Aviation Act 1969 [Act 3]
- Employees' Social Security Act 1969 [Act 4]
- Election Offences Act 1954 [Act 5]
- ~~Finance Companies Act 1969 [Act 6]~~ ( Repealed by the Banking and Financial Institutions Act 1989 [Act 372] )
- Registration of Criminals and Undesirable Persons Act 1969 [Act 7]
- ~~Lembaga Urusan dan Tabung Haji Act 1969 [Act 8]~~ ( Repealed by the Tabung Haji Act 1995 [Act 535] )
- ~~Bank Pertanian Malaysia Act 1969 [Act 9]~~ ( Repealed by the Bank Pertanian Malaysia Berhad Act 2008 [Act 684] )
- ~~Copyright Act 1969 [Act 10]~~ ( Repealed by the Copyright Act 1987 [Act 332] )
- Malaysian Agricultural Research and Development Institute Act 1969 [Act 11]
- International Monetary Fund (Ratification of Amendments to the Articles of Agreement) Act 1969 [Act 12]

Parliament was suspended (Total: 8)

- ~~Statutory Declarations Act 1960 [Act 13]~~ ( Superseded by the Statutory Declarations Act 1960 [Act 783] )
- Nurses Act 1950 [Act 14]
- Sedition Act 1948 [Act 15]
- Census Act 1960 [Act 16]
- ~~Exchange Control Act 1953 [Act 17]~~ ( Repealed by the Financial Services Act 2013 [Act 758] )
- ~~Housing Trust Act 1950 [Act 18]~~ ( Repealed by the Housing Trust (Dissolution) Act 1976 [Act A339] )
- Elections Act 1958 [Act 19]
- ~~Telecommunications Act 1950 [Act 20]~~ ( Repealed by the Communications and Multimedia Act 1998 [Act 588] )

3rd Parliament of Malaysia (Total: 130)

- Age of Majority Act 1971 [Act 21]
- Tunku Abdul Rahman Putra Al-Haj Pension Act 1971 [Act 22]
- ~~Members of the Administration and Members of Parliament (Pensions and Gratuities) Act 1971 [Act 23]~~ ( Repealed by the Members of Parliament (Remuneration) Act 1980 [Act 237] )
- ~~Free Trade Zone Act 1971 [Act 24]~~ ( Repealed by the Free Zones Act 1990 [Act 438] )
- Summonses and Warrants (Special Provisions) Act 1971 [Act 25]
- Legal Aid Act 1971 [Act 26]
- Private Agencies Act 1971 [Act 27]
- Kootu Funds (Prohibition) Act 1971 [Act 28]
- National Sports Council of Malaysia Act 1971 [Act 29]
- Universities and University Colleges Act 1971 [Act 30]
- Election Commission Act 1957 [Act 31]
- National Language Act 1963/67 [Act 32]
- Bankers' Books (Evidence) Act 1949 [Act 33]
- Maintenance Orders (Facilities for Enforcement) Act 1949 [Act 34]
- ~~Films (Censorship) Act 1952 [Act 35]~~ ( Repealed by the Film Censorship Act 2002 [Act 620] )
- Synod of the Diocese of West Malaysia (Incorporation) Act 1971 [Act 36]
- Firearms (Increased Penalties) Act 1971 [Act 37]
- ~~Finance (Estate Duty) Act 1971 [Act 38]~~ ( Repealed by the Finance Act 1992 [Act 476] )
- Inheritance (Family Provision) Act 1971 [Act 39]
- ~~Metric Weights and Measures Act 1971 [Act 40]~~ ( Repealed by the Weights and Measures Act 1972 [Act 71] )
- Loan (International Tin Buffer Stock) Act 1971 [Act 41]
- Housing Loans Fund Act 1971 [Act 42]
- ~~Private Hospitals Act 1971 [Act 43]~~ ( Repealed by the Private Healthcare Facilities and Services Act 1998 [Act 586] )
- Fishermen’s Associations Act 1971 [Act 44]
- Judges' Remuneration Act 1971 [Act 45]
- ~~Perbadanan Pembangunan Bandar Act 1971 [Act 46]~~ ( Repealed by the Perbadanan Pembangunan Bandar (Dissolution) Act 1996 [Act 547] )
- ~~Lembaga Padi dan Beras Negara Act 1971 [Act 47]~~ ( Repealed by the Control of Padi and Rice Act 1994 [Act 522] )
- ~~National Institute for Scientific and Industrial Research (Incorporation) Act 1971 [Act 48]~~ ( Repealed by the Standards and Industrial Research Institute of Malaysia (Incorporation) Act 1975 [Act 157] )
- Lembaga Kemajuan Ikan Malaysia Act 1971 [Act 49]
- Medical Act 1971 [Act 50]
- Dental Act 1971 [Act 51]
- ~~Malaria Eradication Act 1971 [Act 52]~~ ( Repealed by the Prevention and Control of Infectious Diseases Act 1988 [Act 342] )
- Income Tax Act 1967 [Act 53]
- ~~Supplementary Income Tax Act 1967 [Act 54]~~ ( Repealed by the Finance Act 1993 [Act 497] )
- Subordinate Courts Rules Act 1955 [Act 55]
- Evidence Act 1950 [Act 56]
- ~~Prevention of Corruption Act 1961 [Act 57]~~ ( Repealed by the Anti-Corruption Act 1997 [Act 575] )
- ~~Printing Presses Act 1948 [Act 58]~~ ( Repealed by the Printing Presses and Publications Act 1984 [Act 301] )
- City of Kuala Lumpur Act 1971 [Act 59]
- Legitimacy Act 1961 [Act 60]
- Financial Procedure Act 1957 [Act 61]
- Audit Act 1957 [Act 62]
- ~~Control of Imported Publications Act 1958 [Act 63]~~ ( Repealed by the Printing Presses and Publications Act 1984 [Act 301] )
- ~~Sales Tax Act 1972 [Act 64]~~ ( Repealed by the Goods And Services Tax Act 2014 [Act 762] )
- Gaming Tax Act 1972 [Act 65]
- Loan Guarantee Act 1972 [Act 66]
- Civil Law Act 1956 [Act 67]
- ~~Lembaga Kemajuan Pahang Tenggara Act 1972 [Act 68]~~ ( Repealed by the Lembaga Kemajuan Pahang Tenggara (Dissolution) Act 1997 [Act 569] )
- Kemubu Agricultural Development Authority Act 1972 [Act 69]
- Muda Agricultural Development Authority Act 1972 [Act 70]
- Weights and Measures Act 1972 [Act 71]
- ~~Tourist Development Corporation of Malaysia Act 1972 [Act 72]~~ ( Repealed by the Malaysia Tourism Promotion Board Act 1992 [Act 481] )
- ~~Lembaga Kemajuan Perusahaan Haiwan Negara Act 1972 [Act 73]~~ ( Repealed by the Lembaga Kemajuan Ternakan Negara (Dissolution) Act 1983 [Act 292] )
- St. John Ambulance of Malaysia (Incorporation) Act 1972 [Act 74]
- Lembaga Kemajuan Johor Tenggara Act 1972 [Act 75]
- ~~Protection of Wild Life Act 1972 [Act 76]~~ ( Repealed by the Wildlife Conservation Act 2010 [Act 716] )
- Armed Forces Act 1972 [Act 77]
- National Registration Act 1959 [Act 78]
- ~~Banishment Act 1959 [Act 79]~~ ( Repealed by the Banishment (Repeal) Act 2011 [Act 735] )
- National Library Act 1972 [Act 80]
- Pawnbrokers Act 1972 [Act 81]
- ~~Internal Security Act 1960 [Act 82]~~ ( Repealed by the Security Offences (Special Measures) Act 2012 [Act 747] )
- Continental Shelf Act 1966 [Act 83]
- ~~Malaysian Rubber Exchange and Licensing Board Act 1972 [Act 84]~~ ( Repealed by the Malaysian Rubber Board (Incorporation) Act 1996 [Act 551] )
- Rubber Industry Smallholders Development Authority Act 1972 [Act 85]
- Superior of the Institute of the Congregation of the Brothers of Mercy (Incorporation) Act 1972 [Act 86]
- ~~Trade Descriptions Act 1972 [Act 87]~~ ( Repealed by the Trade Descriptions Act 2011 [Act 730] )
- Official Secrets Act 1972 [Act 88]
- ~~Insurance Act 1963 [Act 89]~~ ( Repealed by the Insurance Act 1996 [Act 553] )
- ~~Juvenile Courts Act 1947 [Act 90]~~ ( Repealed by the Child Act 2001 [Act 611] )
- Courts of Judicature Act 1964 [Act 91]
- Subordinate Courts Act 1948 [Act 92]
- ~~Arbitration Act 1952 [Act 93]~~ ( Repealed by the Arbitration Act 2005 [Act 646] )
- Accountants Act 1967 [Act 94]
- Petroleum Mining Act 1966 [Act 95]
- Loans Guarantee (Bodies Corporate) Act 1965 [Act 96]
- Probate and Administration Act 1959 [Act 97]
- Small Estates (Distribution) Act 1955 [Act 98]
- Reciprocal Enforcement of Judgments Act 1958 [Act 99]
- Trust Companies Act 1949 [Act 100]

=== 101 – 200 ===
- Tabung Angkatan Tentera Act 1973 [Act 101]
- ~~Banking Act 1973 [Act 102]~~ ( Repealed by the Banking and Financial Institutions Act 1989 [Act 372] )
- Entertainments Duty Act 1953 [Act 103]
- Lembaga Kemajuan Terengganu Tengah Act 1973 [Act 104]
- Malaysian Timber Industry Board (Incorporation) Act 1973 [Act 105]
- ~~Women and Girls Protection Act 1973 [Act 106]~~ ( Repealed by the Child Act 2001 [Act 611] )
- ~~City of Kuala Lumpur (Planning) Act 1973 [Act 107]~~ ( Repealed by the Federal Territory (Planning) Act 1982 [Act 267] )
- Good Shepherd Nuns (Incorporation) Act 1973 [Act 108]
- Farmers' Organization Act 1973 [Act 109]
- Farmers' Organization Authority Act 1973 [Act 110]
- ~~National Tobacco Board (Incorporation) Act 1973 [Act 111]~~ ( Repealed by the National Kenaf and Tobacco Board Act 2009 [Act 692] )
- ~~Securities Industry Act 1973 [Act 112]~~ ( Repealed by the Securities Industry Act 1983 [Act 280] )
- ~~Post Office Savings Bank Act 1948 [Act 113]~~ ( Repealed by the Bank Simpanan Nasional Act 1974 [Act 146] )
- Judicial Proceedings (Regulation of Reports) Act 1962 [Act 114]
- Notaries Public Act 1959 [Act 115]
- ~~Electricity Act 1949 [Act 116]~~ ( Repealed by the Electricity Supply Act 1990 [Act 447] )
- Architects Act 1967 [Act 117]
- Housing Development (Control and Licensing) Act 1966 [Act 118]
- Commissions of Enquiry Act 1950 [Act 119]
- Government Contracts Act 1949 [Act 120]
- Price Control Act 1946 [Act 121]
- Control of Supplies Act 1961 [Act 122]
- ~~Biro Siasatan Negara Act 1973 [Act 123]~~ ( Repealed by the Anti-Corruption Agency Act 1982 [Act 271] )
- ~~Local Government (Temporary Provisions) Act 1973 [Act 124]~~ ( Repealed by the Local Government Act 1976 [Act 171] )
- ~~Companies Act 1965 [Act 125]~~ ( Repealed by the Companies Act 2016 [Act 777] )
- ~~Land Speculation Tax Act 1974 [Act 126]~~ ( Repealed by the Real Property Gains Tax Act 1976 [Act 169] )
- Environmental Quality Act 1974 [Act 127]
- Petroleum and Electricity (Control of Supplies) Act 1974 [Act 128]
- Geological Survey Act 1974 [Act 129]
- Human Tissues Act 1974 [Act 130]
- ~~Roman Catholic Bishops (Change of Name and Incorporation) Act 1974 [Act 131]~~ ( Repealed by the Roman Catholic Bishops (Incorporation) Act 1957 [Act 492] )
- Income Tax (Tin Buffer Stock Contributions and Repayments) Act 1974 [Act 132]
- Street, Drainage and Building Act 1974 [Act 133]
- Aboriginal Peoples Act 1954 [Act 134]
- Partnership Act 1961 [Act 135]
- Contracts Act 1950 [Act 136]
- Specific Relief Act 1950 [Act 137]
- Registration of Engineers Act 1967 [Act 138]
- Factories and Machinery Act 1967 [Act 139]
- Penang Port Commission Act 1955 [Act 140]
- Federal Agricultural Marketing Authority Act 1965 [Act 141]
- Kootu Funds (Validation) Act 1974 [Act 142]
- Scouts Association of Malaysia Act 1974 [Act 143]
- Petroleum Development Act 1974 [Act 144]
- Politeknik Ungku Omar Act 1974 [Act 145]
- Bank Simpanan Nasional Act 1974 [Act 146]
- Veterinary Surgeons Act 1974 [Act 147]
- Carriage by Air Act 1974 [Act 148]
- Pesticides Act 1974 [Act 149]
- Passports Act 1966 [Act 150]

4th Parliament of Malaysia (Total: 55)

- ~~Service Tax Act 1975 [Act 151]~~ ( Repealed by the Goods And Services Tax Act 2014 [Act 762] )
- Registration of Births and Deaths (Special Provisions) Act 1975 [Act 152]
- Islamic Development Bank Act 1975 [Act 153]
- Destruction of Disease-Bearing Insects Act 1975 [Act 154]
- Immigration Act 1959/63 [Act 155]
- Industrial Co-ordination Act 1975 [Act 156]
- ~~Standards and Industrial Research Institute of Malaysia (Incorporation) Act 1975 [Act 157]~~ ( Repealed by the Standards of Malaysia Act 1996 [Act 549] )
- Chemists Act 1975 [Act 158]
- Employment Information Act 1953 [Act 159]
- Malaysian Currency (Ringgit) Act 1975 [Act 160]
- Rubber Price Stabilization Act 1975 [Act 161]
- Malaysian Red Cross Society (Change of Name) Act 1975 [Act 162]
- Extra-territorial Offences Act 1976 [Act 163]
- Law Reform (Marriage and Divorce) Act 1976 [Act 164]
- Law Reform (Eradication of Illicit Samsu) Act 1976 [Act 165]
- Legal Profession Act 1976 [Act 166]
- Plant Quarantine Act 1976 [Act 167]
- ~~Antiquities Act 1976 [Act 168]~~ ( Repealed by the National Heritage Act 2005 [Act 645] )
- Real Property Gains Tax Act 1976 [Act 169]
- Martial Arts Societies Act 1976 [Act 170]
- Local Government Act 1976 [Act 171]
- Town and Country Planning Act 1976 [Act 172]
- Universiti Teknologi MARA Act 1976 [Act 173]
- Educational Institutions (Discipline) Act 1976 [Act 174]
- Trade Marks Act 1976 [Act 175]
- Excise Act 1976 [Act 176]
- Industrial Relations Act 1967 [Act 177]
- Tun Razak Foundation Act 1976 [Act 178]
- ~~Palm Oil Registration and Licensing Authority (Incorporation) Act 1976 [Act 179]~~ ( Repealed by the Malaysian Palm Oil Board Act 1998 [Act 582] )
- Medical Assistants (Registration) Act 1977 [Act 180]
- Revenue Growth Grants Act 1977 [Act 181]
- ~~Theatres and Places of Public Amusement (Federal Territory) Act 1977 [Act 182]~~ ( Repealed by the Entertainment (Federal Territory of Kuala Lumpur) Act 1992 [Act 493] )
- Destitute Persons Act 1977 [Act 183]
- International Monetary Fund (Ratification of Second Amendment to the Articles of Agreement) Act 1977 [Act 184]
- Statutory and Local Authorities Superannuation Fund Act 1977 [Act 185]
- ~~Public Service Tribunal Act 1977 [Act 186]~~ ( Repealed by the Public Service Tribunal (Dissolution) Act 2000 [Act 604] )
- Loans (Islamic Development Bank) Act 1977 [Act 187]
- Treasury Bills (Local) Act 1946 [Act 188]
- Second-Hand Dealers Act 1946 [Act 189]
- Federal Capital Act 1960 [Act 190]
- Abduction and Criminal Intimidation of Witnesses Act 1947 [Act 191]
- ~~Emergency Powers (Kelantan) Act 1977 [Act 192]~~ ( Repealed by the Emergency Powers (Repeal of Emergency Powers (Kelantan) Act 1977) Order 1978 [P.U.(A)46/1978] )
- National Emblems (Control of Display) Act 1949 [Act 193]
- Oaths and Affirmations Act 1949 [Act 194]
- ~~Wages Councils Act 1947 [Act 195]~~ ( Repealed by the National Wages Consultative Council Act 2011 [Act 732] )
- Trusts (State Legislatures Competency) Act 1949 [Act 196]
- Registration of Businesses Act 1956 [Act 197]
- Public Authorities Protection Act 1948 [Act 198]
- ~~Investment Incentives Act 1968 [Act 199]~~ ( Repealed by the Promotion of Investments Act 1986 [Act 327] )
- House to House and Street Collections Act 1947 [Act 200]

=== 201 – 300 ===
- Betting and Sweepstake Duties Act 1948 [Act 201]
- Bank Kerjasama Rakyat Malaysia Berhad (Special Provisions) Act 1978 [Act 202]
- Lembaga Kemajuan Kelantan Selatan Act 1978 [Act 203]
- Bills of Exchange Act 1949 [Act 204]
- Presumption of Survivorship Act 1950 [Act 205]

5th Parliament of Malaysia (Total: 68)

- Arms Act 1960 [Act 206]
- Explosives Act 1957 [Act 207]
- Trustee Act 1949 [Act 208]
- Fees Act 1951 [Act 209]
- ~~Fisheries Act 1963 [Act 210]~~ ( Repealed by the Fisheries Act 1985 [Act 317] )
- ~~Post Office Act 1947 [Act 211]~~ ( Repealed by the Postal Services Act 1991 [Act 465] )
- Hire-Purchase Act 1967 [Act 212]
- Dewan Bahasa dan Pustaka Act 1959 [Act 213]
- ~~United Kingdom Designs (Protection) Act 1949 [Act 214]~~ ( Repealed by the Industrial Designs Act 1996 [Act 552] )
- ~~Registration of United Kingdom Patents Act 1951 [Act 215]~~ ( Repealed by the Patents Act 1983 [Act 291] )
- Emergency (Essential Powers) Act 1979 [Act 216]
- Declaration of an Area in the Bintulu District to be a Federal Port Act 1979 [Act 217]
- ~~Palm Oil Research and Development Act 1979 [Act 218]~~ ( Repealed by the Malaysian Palm Oil Board Act 1998 [Act 582] )
- ~~Finance (Estate Duty) Act 1979 [Act 219]~~ ( Repealed by the Finance Act 1992 [Act 476] )
- Weekly Holidays Act 1950 [Act 220]
- Civil Defence Act 1951 [Act 221]
- Perbadanan Kemajuan Kraftangan Malaysia Act 1979 [Act 222]
- ~~Special Pensions (Raja Permaisuri Agong) Act 1979 [Act 223]~~ ( Repealed by the Istana Negara (Royal Allowances) Act 1982 [Act 270] )
- ~~Finance (Estate Duty) Act 1980 [Act 224]~~ ( Repealed by the Finance Act 1992 [Act 476] )
- Malaysian Examinations Council Act 1980 [Act 225]
- National Parks Act 1980 [Act 226]
- Pensions Act 1980 [Act 227]
- Pensions Re-computation Act 1980 [Act 228]
- ~~Commodities Trading Act 1980 [Act 229]~~ ( Repealed by the Commodities Trading Act 1985 [Act 324] )
- State Water Supply Fund (Financial and Accounting Procedure) Act 1980 [Act 230]
- Highway Authority Malaysia (Incorporation) Act 1980 [Act 231]
- ~~Children and Young Persons Act 1947 [Act 232]~~ ( Repealed by the Child Protection Act 1991 [Act 468] )
- Land and Mining Plans and Documents (Photographic Copies) Act 1950 [Act 233]
- Dangerous Drugs Act 1952 [Act 234]
- Customs Act 1967 [Act 235]
- Treasury Deposit Receipts Act 1952 [Act 236]
- Members of Parliament (Remuneration) Act 1980 [Act 237]
- Pensions Adjustment Act 1980 [Act 238]
- Statutory and Local Authorities Pensions Act 1980 [Act 239]
- Statutory Bodies (Accounts and Annual Reports) Act 1980 [Act 240]
- Finance Act 1981 [Act 241]
- Valuers, Appraisers and Estate Agents Act 1981 [Act 242]
- Bintulu Port Authority Act 1981 [Act 243]
- Perbadanan Kemajuan Filem Nasional Malaysia Act 1981 [Act 244]
- State Grants (Maintenance of Local Authorities) Act 1981 [Act 245]
- Private Employment Agencies Act 1981 [Act 246]
- ~~Public Trustee Act 1950 [Act 247]~~ ( Repealed by the Public Trust Corporation Act 1995 [Act 532] )
- Innkeepers Act 1952 [Act 248]
- Lembaga Kemajuan Wilayah Kedah Act 1981 [Act 249]
- Federation Light Dues Act 1953 [Act 250]
- Planters' Loans Fund (Dissolution) Act 1981 [Act 251]
- ~~Social and Welfare Services Lotteries Board Act 1950–1962 [Act 252]~~ ( Repealed by the Social and Welfare Services Lotteries Board (Dissolution) Act 1991 [Act 470] )
- Registration of Adoptions Act 1952 [Act 253]
- Limitation Act 1953 [Act 254]
- Distress Act 1951 [Act 255]
- Debtors Act 1957 [Act 256]
- Adoption Act 1952 [Act 257]
- Trustees (Incorporation) Act 1952 [Act 258]
- Indecent Advertisements Act 1953 [Act 259]
- Hydrogen Cyanide (Fumigation) Act 1953 [Act 260]
- Malaysian Standard Time Act 1981 [Act 261]
- Trade Unions Act 1959 [Act 262]
- Married Women and Children (Maintenance) Act 1950 [Act 263]
- Finance Act 1982 [Act 264]
- Employment Act 1955 [Act 265]
- Federal Territory (Financial Arrangement) Act 1982 [Act 266]
- Federal Territory (Planning) Act 1982 [Act 267]
- Bills of Sale Act 1950 [Act 268]
- Civil List Act 1982 [Act 269]
- Istana Negara (Royal Allowances) Act 1982 [Act 270]
- ~~Anti-Corruption Agency Act 1982 [Act 271]~~ ( Repealed by the Anti-Corruption Act 1997 [Act 575] )
- ~~Employees Provident Fund Act 1951 [Act 272]~~ ( Repealed by the Employees Provident Fund Act 1991 [Act 452] )
- Workmen’s Compensation Act 1952 [Act 273]

6th Parliament of Malaysia (Total: 54)

- Finance (No. 2) Act 1982 [Act 274]
- Government Funding Act 1983 [Act 275]
- ~~Islamic Banking Act 1983 [Act 276]~~ ( Repealed by the Islamic Financial Services Act 2013 [Act 759] )
- ~~Electrical Inspectorate Act 1983 [Act 277]~~ ( Repealed by the Electricity Supply Act 1990 [Act 447] )
- ~~Lembaga Letrik Sabah Act 1983 [Act 278]~~ ( Repealed by P.U (A) 37/2008 )
- ~~Perbadanan Pembekalan Letrik Sarawak Act 1983 [Act 279]~~ ( Not yet in force )
- ~~Securities Industry Act 1983 [Act 280]~~ ( Repealed by the Capital Markets and Services Act 2007 [Act 671] )
- Food Act 1983 [Act 281]
- Lembaga Kemajuan Wilayah Pulau Pinang Act 1983 [Act 282]
- Drug Dependants (Treatment and Rehabilitation) Act 1983 [Act 283]
- Raja-Raja and the Yang di-Pertua-Yang di-Pertua Negeri Higher Studies Scholarship Fund Act 1983 [Act 284]
- ~~Lembaga Kemajuan Wilayah Jengka Act 1983 [Act 285]~~ ( Repealed by the Lembaga Kemajuan Wilayah Jengka (Dissolution) Act 1997 [Act 567] )
- Defamation Act 1957 [Act 286]
- ~~Co-operative Societies Act 1948 [Act 287]~~ ( Repealed by the Co-operative Societies Act 1993 [Act 502] )
- Lotteries Act 1952 [Act 288]
- Common Gaming Houses Act 1953 [Act 289]
- Medicines (Advertisement and Sale) Act 1956 [Act 290]
- Patents Act 1983 [Act 291]
- Lembaga Kemajuan Ternakan Negara (Dissolution) Act 1983 [Act 292]
- Finance Act 1983 [Act 293]
- Goods Vehicle Levy Act 1983 [Act 294]
- Military Manoeuvres Act 1983 [Act 295]
- Public Order (Preservation) Act 1958 [Act 296]
- Prevention of Crime Act 1959 [Act 297]
- Protected Areas and Protected Places Act 1959 [Act 298]
- Births and Deaths Registration Act 1957 [Act 299]
- Distribution Act 1958 [Act 300]

=== 301 – 400 ===
- Printing Presses and Publications Act 1984 [Act 301]
- Petroleum (Safety Measures) Act 1984 [Act 302]
- Islamic Family Law (Federal Territories) Act 1984 [Act 303]
- Atomic Energy Licensing Act 1984 [Act 304]
- National Defence Fund (Dissolution and Transfer) Act 1984 [Act 305]
- Federal Roads (Private Management) Act 1984 [Act 306]
- Aviation Offences Act 1984 [Act 307]
- Child Care Centre Act 1984 [Act 308]
- Finance Act 1984 [Act 309]
- ~~Share (Land Based Company) Transfer Tax Act 1984 [Act 310]~~ ( Repealed by the Finance Act 1988 [Act 364] )
- Exclusive Economic Zone Act 1984 [Act 311]
- ~~Takaful Act 1984 [Act 312]~~ ( Repealed by the Islamic Financial Services Act 2013 [Act 759] )
- National Forestry Act 1984 [Act 313]
- Wood-based Industries (State Legislatures Competency) Act 1984 [Act 314]
- Finance Act 1985 [Act 315]
- Dangerous Drugs (Special Preventive Measures) Act 1985 [Act 316]
- Fisheries Act 1985 [Act 317]
- Strata Titles Act 1985 [Act 318]
- Malaysian Forestry Research and Development Board Act 1985 [Act 319]
- ~~Convention on the Recognition and Enforcement of Foreign Arbitral Awards Act 1985 [Act 320]~~ ( Repealed by the Arbitration Act 2005 [Act 646] )
- Rubber Statutory Bodies Act 1985 [Act 321]
- Telecommunication Services (Successor Company) Act 1985 [Act 322]
- Finance (No. 2) Act 1985 [Act 323]
- ~~Commodities Trading Act 1985 [Act 324]~~ ( Repealed by the Futures Industry (Amendment and Consolidation) Act 1997 [Act A987] )
- Kedah and Penang (Alteration of Boundary) Act 1985 [Act 325]
- Printing of Qur’anic Texts Act 1986 [Act 326]
- Promotion of Investments Act 1986 [Act 327]

7th Parliament of Malaysia (Total: 123)

- Finance Act 1986 [Act 328]
- Finance (No. 2) Act 1986 [Act 329]
- Finance (Banking and Financial Institutions) Act 1986 [Act 330]
- Deposit of Library Material Act 1986 [Act 331]
- Copyright Act 1987 [Act 332]
- Road Transport Act 1987 [Act 333]
- Commercial Vehicles Licensing Board Act 1987 [Act 334]
- Societies Act 1966 [Act 335]
- Minor Offences Act 1955 [Act 336]
- Finance Act 1987 [Act 337]
- ~~Broadcasting Act 1988 [Act 338]~~ ( Repealed by the Communications and Multimedia Act 1998 [Act 588] )
- National Trust Fund Act 1988 [Act 339]
- Dangerous Drugs (Forfeiture of Property) Act 1988 [Act 340]
- Fire Services Act 1988 [Act 341]
- Prevention and Control of Infectious Diseases Act 1988 [Act 342]
- Malaysian Cocoa Board (Incorporation) Act 1988 [Act 343]
- Police Act 1967 [Act 344]
- Criminal Justice Act 1953 [Act 345]
- Wills Act 1959 [Act 346]
- Houses of Parliament (Privileges and Powers) Act 1952 [Act 347]
- Diplomatic and Consular Officers (Oaths and Fees) Act 1959 [Act 348]
- Federal Lands Commissioner Act 1957 [Act 349]
- Children and Young Persons (Employment) Act 1966 [Act 350]
- Guardianship of Infants Act 1961 [Act 351]
- Population and Family Development Act 1966 [Act 352]
- Employment (Restriction) Act 1968 [Act 353]
- Drainage Works Act 1954 [Act 354]
- Syariah Courts (Criminal Jurisdiction) Act 1965 [Act 355]
- Married Women and Children (Enforcement of Maintenance) Act 1968 [Act 356]
- Corrosive and Explosive Substances and Offensive Weapons Act 1958 [Act 357]
- Delegation of Powers Act 1956 [Act 358]
- Government Proceedings Act 1956 [Act 359]
- Bankruptcy Act 1967 [Act 360]
- ~~Customs (Dumping and Subsidies) Act 1959 [Act 361]~~ ( Repealed by the Countervailing and Anti-Dumping Duties Act 1993 [Act 504] )
- Tin Control Act 1954 [Act 362]
- ~~Control of Rent Act 1966 [Act 363]~~ ( Repealed by the Control of Rent (Repeal) Act 1997 [Act 572] )
- Finance Act 1988 [Act 364]
- Kidnapping Act 1961 [Act 365]
- Poisons Act 1952 [Act 366]
- Malaysian Chamber of Mines Incorporation Act 1914 [Act 367]
- Sale of Drugs Act 1952 [Act 368]
- Holidays Act 1951 [Act 369]
- Unclaimed Moneys Act 1965 [Act 370]
- Registration of Pharmacists Act 1951 [Act 371]
- ~~Banking and Financial Institutions Act 1989 [Act 372]~~ ( Repealed by the Financial Services Act 2013 [Act 758] )
- Yang di-Pertuan Agong (Exercise of Functions) Act 1957 [Act 373]
- Timbalan Yang di-Pertuan Agong (Remuneration) Act 1958 [Act 374]
- Minister of Finance (Incorporation) Act 1957 [Act 375]
- Federal Roads Act 1959 [Act 376]
- ~~Restricted Residence Act 1933 [Act 377]~~ ( Repealed by the Restricted Residence (Repeal) Act 2011 [Act 734] )
- Stamp Act 1949 [Act 378]
- Degrees and Diplomas Act 1962 [Act 379]
- Incorporation (State Legislatures Competency) Act 1962 [Act 380]
- Registration of Guests Act 1965 [Act 381]
- Sale of Goods Act 1957 [Act 382]
- Public Authorities (Control of Borrowing Powers) Act 1961 [Act 383]
- Pool Betting Act 1967 [Act 384]
- Land Conservation Act 1960 [Act 385]
- Irrigation Areas Act 1953 [Act 386]
- Attestation of Registrable Instruments (Mining) Act 1960 [Act 387]
- Interpretation Acts 1948 and 1967 [Act 388]
- Tunku Abdul Rahman Foundation Fund Act 1966 [Act 389]
- National Anthem Act 1968 [Act 390]
- Federal Housing Act 1965 [Act 391]
- Convention on the Settlement of Investment Disputes Act 1966 [Act 392]
- Service Commissions Act 1957 [Act 393]
- ~~Parliamentary Services Act 1963 [Act 394]~~ (Repealed by the Constitution (Amendment) Act 1992 [Act A837] )
- Assignment of Revenue (Export Duty on Iron Ore) Act 1962 [Act 395]
- Assignment of Export Duty (Mineral Ores) Act 1964 [Act 396]
- Malaysian Industrial Development Authority (Incorporation) Act 1965 [Act 397]
- ~~National Land Rehabilitation and Consolidation Authority (Incorporation) Act 1966 [Act 398]~~ (Repealed by the National Land Rehabilitation and Consolidation Authority (Succession and Dissolution) Act 1997 [Act 570] )
- Titles of Office Act 1949 [Act 399]
- Moneylenders Act 1951 [Act 400]

=== 401 – 500 ===
- ~~Malaysian Rubber Research and Development Fund Act 1958 [Act 401]~~ ( Repealed by the Malaysian Rubber Board (Incorporation) Act 1996 [Act 551] )
- Malaysian Rubber Exchange (Incorporation) Act 1962 [Act 402]
- External Loans Act 1963 [Act 403]
- Racing Club (Public Sweepstakes) Act 1965 [Act 404]
- Extended Credit Act 1966 [Act 405]
- Development Funds Act 1966 [Act 406]
- ~~Rubber Research Institute of Malaysia Act 1966 [Act 407]~~ ( Repealed by the Malaysian Rubber Board (Incorporation) Act 1996 [Act 551] )
- Malaysia Productivity Corporation (Incorporation) Act 1966 [Act 408]
- ~~Scouts Association of Malaysia (Incorporation) Act 1968 [Act 409]~~ ( Superseded by the Scouts Association of Malaysia (Incorporation) Act 1968 [Act 784] )
- Loans (Asian Development Bank ) Act 1968 [Act 410]
- Loans (International Bank) Act 1958 [Act 411]
- Loan Guarantee Act 1958 [Act 412]
- Service Lands Act 1963 [Act 413]
- Emblem and Names (Prevention of Improper Use) 1963 [Act 414]
- Statistics Act 1965 [Act 415]
- Tolls (Roads and Bridges) Act 1965 [Act 416]
- Malaysian Combined Cadet Force Act 1967 [Act 417]
- Waters Act 1920 [Act 418]
- ~~Port Workers (Regulation of Employment) Act 1965 [Act 419]~~ ( Repealed by the Port Workers (Regulation of Employment) (Dissolution) Act 2000 [Act 607] )
- Finance Act 1990 [Act 420]
- Finance (No. 2) Act 1990 [Act 421]
- Ports (Privatization) Act 1990 [Act 422]
- Lembaga Pembangunan Langkawi Act 1990 [Act 423]
- Powers of Attorney Act 1949 [Act 424]
- National Service Act 1952 [Act 425]
- Government Trustee Securities Act 1957 [Act 426]
- Pineapple Industry Act 1957 [Act 427]
- International Finance Corporation Act 1957 [Act 428]
- Counterfeit Coin Act 1957 [Act 429]
- Coin (Import and Export) Act 1957 [Act 430]
- International Development Association Act 1960 [Act 431]
- Visiting Forces Act 1960 [Act 432]
- ~~Merdeka Stadium Corporation Act 1963 [Act 433]~~ ( Repealed by the Perbadanan Stadium Malaysia Act 2010 [Act 717] )
- ~~Cinematograph Film-Hire Duty Act 1965 [Act 434]~~ ( Repealed by the Finance Act 1997 [Act 557] )
- Estate Hospital Assistants (Registration) Act 1965 [Act 435]
- Midwives Act 1966 [Act 436]
- Co-operative College (Incorporation) Act 1968 [Act 437]
- Free Zones Act 1990 [Act 438]
- Seri Pahlawan Gagah Perkasa (Remembrance Allowance) Act 1990 [Act 439]
- Malaysia-Thailand Joint Authority Act 1990 [Act 440]
- Labuan Companies Act 1990 [Act 441]
- ~~Labuan Trust Companies Act 1990 [Act 442]~~ ( Repealed by the Labuan Financial Services and Securities Act 2010 [Act 704] )
- ~~Offshore Banking Act 1990 [Act 443]~~ ( Repealed by the Labuan Financial Services and Securities Act 2010 [Act 704] )
- ~~Offshore Insurance Act 1990 [Act 444]~~ ( Repealed by the Labuan Financial Services and Securities Act 2010 [Act 704] )
- Labuan Business Activity Tax Act 1990 [Act 445]
- Workers' Minimum Standards of The Housing and Amenities Act 1990 [Act 446]
- Electricity Supply Act 1990 [Act 447]
- Electricity Supply (Successor Company) Act 1990 [Act 448]
- ~~Bernama Act 1967 [Act 449]~~ ( Superseded by the BERNAMA Act 1967 [Act 780] )
- Married Woman Act 1957 [Act 450]

8th Parliament of Malaysia (Total: 85)

- Finance Act 1991 [Act 451]
- Employees Provident Fund Act 1991 [Act 452]
- Securities Industry (Central Depositories) Act 1991 [Act 453]
- ~~Pensions Trust Fund Act 1991 [Act 454]~~ ( Repealed by the Retirement Fund Act 2007 [Act 662] )
- Tin Industry (Research and Development) Fund Act 1953 [Act 455]
- Girl Guides Act 1953 [Act 456]
- Methodist Church in Malaysia Act 1955 [Act 457]
- Licensed Land Surveyors Act 1958 [Act 458]
- Loans (Central Bank of Malaysia) Act 1960 [Act 459]
- Kelantan Land Settlement Act 1955 [Act 460]
- Offenders Compulsory Attendance Act 1954 [Act 461]
- Asian Development Bank Act 1966 [Act 462]
- Railways Act 1991 [Act 463]
- Railways (Successor Company) Act 1991 [Act 464]
- ~~Postal Services Act 1991 [Act 465]~~ ( Repealed by the Postal Services Act 2012 [Act 741] )
- Postal Services (Successor Company) Act 1991 [Act 466]
- Airport and Aviation Services (Operating Company) Act 1991 [Act 467]
- ~~Child Protection Act 1991 [Act 468]~~ ( Repealed by the Child Act 2001 [Act 611] )
- Optical Act 1991 [Act 469]
- Social and Welfare Services Lotteries Board (Dissolution) Act 1991 [Act 470]
- Native Courts (Criminal Jurisdiction) Act 1991 [Act 471]
- Bretton Woods Agreements Act 1957 [Act 472]
- Local Government Elections Act 1960 [Act 473]
- Land Development Act 1956 [Act 474]
- ~~Rubber Export Registration Act 1966 [Act 475]~~ ( Repealed by the Malaysian Rubber Board (Incorporation) Act 1996 [Act 551] )
- Finance Act 1992 [Act 476]
- Import Duties (Validation) Act 1992 [Act 477]
- Revocation of Exemption from Payment of Stamp Duties Act 1992 [Act 478]
- Extradition Act 1992 [Act 479]
- ~~Lembaga Pembangunan Labuan Act 1992 [Act 480]~~ ( Repealed by the Perbadanan Labuan Act 2001 [Act 609] )
- Malaysia Tourism Promotion Board Act 1992 [Act 481]
- Tourism Industry Act 1992 [Act 482]
- International Fund for Agricultural Development Act 1992 [Act 483]
- Loans (International Fund for Agricultural Development) Act 1992 [Act 484]
- International Organizations (Privileges and Immunities) Act 1992 [Act 485]
- Land Acquisition Act 1960 [Act 486]
- Quantity Surveyors Act 1967 [Act 487]
- Port Authorities Act 1963 [Act 488]
- Majlis Amanah Rakyat Act 1966 [Act 489]
- Malaysia External Trade Development Corporation Act 1992 [Act 490]
- ~~Human Resources Development Act 1992 [Act 491]~~ ( Repealed by the Pembangunan Sumber Manusia Berhad Act 2001 [Act 612] )
- Roman Catholic Bishops (Incorporation) Act 1957 [Act 492]
- Entertainment (Federal Territory of Kuala Lumpur) Act 1992 [Act 493]
- Racing (Totalizator Board) Act 1961 [Act 494]
- Betting Act 1953 [Act 495]
- ~~South Indian Labour Fund Act 1958 [Act 496]~~ ( Repealed by the South Indian Labour Fund (Dissolution) Act 1999 [Act 596] )
- Finance Act [Act 497]
- Securities Commission Act 1993 [Act 498]
- ~~Futures Industry Act 1993 [Act 499]~~ ( Repealed by the Capital Markets And Services Act 2007 [Act 671] )
- Direct Sales and Anti-Pyramid Scheme Act 1993 [Act 500]

=== 501 – 600 ===
- Gas Supply Act 1993 [Act 501]
- Co-operative Societies Act 1993 [Act 502]
- Capitation Grant Act 1993 [Act 503]
- Countervailing and Anti-Dumping Duties Act 1993 [Act 504]
- Administration of Islamic Law (Federal Territories) Act 1993 [Act 505]
- Care Centres Act 1993 [Act 506]
- Abattoirs (Privatization) Act 1993 [Act 507]
- ~~Sewerage Services Act 1993 [Act 508]~~ ( Repealed by the Water Services Industry Act 2006 [Act 655] )
- Subang Golf Course Corporation Act 1968 [Act 509]
- National Association Of Women’s Institutes Of Malaysia Incorporation Act 1958 [Act 510]
- ~~National Archives Act 1966 [Act 511]~~ ( Repealed by the National Archives Act 2003 [Act 629] )
- Geneva Conventions Act 1962 [Act 512]
- Finance Act 1994 [Act 513]
- Occupational Safety and Health Act 1994 [Act 514]
- Merchant Shipping (Oil Pollution) Act 1994 [Act 515]
- ~~National Art Gallery Act 1959 [Act 516]~~ ( Repealed by the National Visual Arts Development Board Act 2011 [Act 724] )
- Cheng Hoon Teng Temple (Incorporation) Act 1949 [Act 517]
- National Land Code (Penang And Malacca Titles) Act 1963 [Act 518]
- ~~Central Bank Of Malaysia Act 1958 [Act 519]~~ ( Repealed by the Central Bank Of Malaysia Act 2009 [Act 701] )
- Lembaga Pembangunan Industri Pembinaan Malaysia Act 1994 [Act 520]
- Domestic Violence Act 1994 [Act 521]
- Control of Padi and Rice Act 1994 [Act 522]
- Lembaga Padi dan Beras Negara (Successor Company) Act 1994 [Act 523]
- Academy of Sciences Malaysia Act 1994 [Act 524]
- Mineral Development Act 1994 [Act 525]
- ~~Rubber Shipping and Packing Control Act 1949 [Act 526]~~ ( Repealed by the Malaysian Rubber Board (Incorporation) Act 1996 [Act 551] )
- Carriage of Goods by Sea Act 1950 [Act 527]
- Padi Cultivators (Control of Rent and Security of Tenure) Act 1967 [Act 528]
- Director General of Social Welfare (Incorporation) Act 1948 [Act 529]
- Land (Group Settlement Areas) Act 1960 [Act 530]
- Finance Act 1995 [Act 531]
- Public Trust Corporation Act 1995 [Act 532]
- Inland Revenue Board of Malaysia Act 1995 [Act 533]
- Malayan Railway Provident Fund (Dissolution) Act 1995 [Act 534]
- Tabung Haji Act 1995 [Act 535]

9th Parliament of Malaysia (Total: 64)

- Perbadanan Putrajaya Act 1995 [Act 536]
- Prison Act 1995 [Act 537]
- Town Planners Act 1995 [Act 538]
- Small and Medium Industries Development Corporation Act 1995 [Act 539]
- Malaysian Red Crescent Society (Incorporation) Act 1965 [Act 540]
- Foreign Representatives (Privileges and Immunities) Act 1967 [Act 541]
- ~~Treasure Trove Act 1957 [Act 542]~~ ( Repealed by the National Heritage Act 2005 [Act 645] )
- Petroleum (Income Tax) Act 1967 [Act 543]
- Finance Act 1996 [Act 544]
- Labuan Offshore Financial Services Authority Act 1996 [Act 545]
- National Council on Higher Education Act 1996 [Act 546]
- Perbadanan Pembangunan Bandar (Dissolution) Act 1996 [Act 547]
- Perbadanan Pembangunan Bandar (Successor Company) Act 1996 [Act 548]
- Standards of Malaysia Act 1996 [Act 549]
- Education Act 1996 [Act 550]
- Malaysian Rubber Board (Incorporation) Act 1996 [Act 551]
- Industrial Designs Act 1996 [Act 552]
- ~~Insurance Act 1996 [Act 553]~~ ( Repealed by the Financial Services Act 2013 [Act 758] )
- Labuan Offshore Trusts Act 1996 [Act 554]
- Private Higher Educational Institutions Act 1996 [Act 555]
- ~~Lembaga Akreditasi Negara Act 1996 [Act 556]~~ ( Repealed by the Malaysian Qualifications Agency Act 2007 [Act 679] )
- Finance Act 1997 [Act 557]
- Financial Reporting Act 1997 [Act 558]
- Syariah Criminal Offences (Federal Territories) Act 1997 [Act 559]
- Syariah Criminal Procedure (Federal Territories) Act 1997 [Act 560]
- Syariah Court Evidence (Federal Territories) Act 1997 [Act 561]
- Digital Signature Act 1997 [Act 562]
- Computer Crimes Act 1997 [Act 563]
- ~~Telemedicine Act 1997 [Act 564]~~ ( Not yet in force )
- ~~Labuan Offshore Limited Partnerships Act 1997 [Act 565]~~ ( Repealed by the Labuan Limited Partnerships and Limited Liability Partnerships Act 2010 [Act 707] )
- Perbadanan Tabung Pendidikan Tinggi Nasional Act 1997 [Act 566]
- Lembaga Kemajuan Wilayah Jengka (Dissolution) Act 1997 [Act 567]
- Lembaga Kemajuan Johor Tenggara (Dissolution) Act 1997 [Act 568]
- Lembaga Kemajuan Pahang Tenggara (Dissolution) Act 1997 [Act 569]
- National Land Rehabilitation and Consolidation Authority (Succession and Dissolution) Act 1997 [Act 570]
- ~~Bank Simpanan Nasional Berhad Act 1997 [Act 571]~~ ( Not yet in force )
- Control of Rent (Repeal) Act 1997 [Act 572]
- Joint Service (Islamic Affairs Officers) Act 1997 [Act 573]
- Penal Code [Act 574]
- ~~Anti-Corruption Act 1997 [Act 575]~~ ( Repealed by the Malaysian Anti-Corruption Commission Act 2009 [Act 694] )
- Sports Development Act 1997 [Act 576]
- ~~Money-Changing Act 1998 [Act 577]~~ ( Repealed by the Money Services Business Act 2011 [Act 731] )
- Finance Act 1998 [Act 578]
- ~~Labuan Offshore Securities Industry Act 1998 [Act 579]~~ ( Repealed by the Labuan Financial Services and Securities Act 2010 [Act 704] )
- Counsellors Act 1998 [Act 580]
- Water Supply (Federal Territory of Kuala Lumpur) Act 1998 [Act 581]
- Malaysian Palm Oil Board Act 1998 [Act 582]
- Fees (National Planetarium) (Validation) Act 1998 [Act 583]
- Teachers' Superannuation Fund (Sabah) (Dissolution) Act 1998 [Act 584]
- Syariah Court Civil Procedure (Federal Territories) Act 1998 [Act 585]
- Private Healthcare Facilities and Services Act 1998 [Act 586]
- Pengurusan Danaharta Nasional Berhad Act 1998 [Act 587]
- Communications and Multimedia Act 1998 [Act 588]
- Malaysian Communications and Multimedia Commission Act 1998 [Act 589]
- Franchise Act 1998 [Act 590]
- Finance (No. 2) Act 1998 [Act 591]
- Windfall Profit Levy Act 1998 [Act 592]
- Criminal Procedure Code [Act 593]
- Tourism Vehicles Licensing Act 1999 [Act 594]
- Consular Relations (Vienna Convention) Act 1999 [Act 595]
- South Indian Labour Fund (Dissolution) Act 1999 [Act 596]
- Human Rights Commission of Malaysia Act 1999 [Act 597]
- Statutory Bodies (Power to Borrow) Act 1999 [Act 598]
- Consumer Protection Act 1999 [Act 599]

10th Parliament of Malaysia (Total: 33)

- Finance Act 2000 [Act 600]

=== 601 – 700 ===
- Layout-Designs of Integrated Circuits Act 2000 [Act 601]
- Geographical Indications Act 2000 [Act 602]
- Anti-Personnel Mines Convention Implementation Act 2000 [Act 603]
- Public Service Tribunal (Dissolution) Act 2000 [Act 604]
- Statutory Bodies (Discipline and Surcharge) Act 2000 [Act 605]
- Optical Discs Act 2000 [Act 606]
- Port Workers (Regulation of Employment) (Dissolution) Act 2000 [Act 607]
- Finance (No. 2) Act 2000 [Act 608]
- Perbadanan Labuan Act 2001 [Act 609]
- Energy Commission Act 2001 [Act 610]
- Child Act 2001 [Act 611]
- Pembangunan Sumber Manusia Berhad Act 2001 [Act 612]
- Anti-Money Laundering, Anti-Terrorism Financing and Proceeds of Unlawful Activities Act 2001 [Act 613]
- Companies Commission of Malaysia Act 2001 [Act 614]
- Mental Health Act 2001 [Act 615]
- Panglima Gagah Berani (Remembrance Allowance) Act 2001 [Act 616]
- Intellectual Property Corporation of Malaysia Act 2002 [Act 617]
- Development Financial Institutions Act 2002 [Act 618]
- Finance Act 2002 [Act 619]
- Film Censorship Act 2002 [Act 620]
- Mutual Assistance in Criminal Matters Act 2002 [Act 621]
- Capitation Grant Act 2002 [Act 622]
- Islamic Financial Services Board Act 2002 [Act 623]
- Finance (No. 2) Act 2002 [Act 624]
- National Land Code (Validation) Act 2003 [Act 625]
- Hotels (Federal Territory of Kuala Lumpur) Act 2003 [Act 626]
- ~~Payment Systems Act 2003 [Act 627]~~ ( Repealed by the Financial Services Act 2013 [Act 758] )
- National Service Training Act 2003 [Act 628]
- National Archives Act 2003 [Act 629]
- Langkawi International Yacht Registry Act 2003 [Act 630]
- Finance Act 2003 [Act 631]
- Demutualisation (Kuala Lumpur Stock Exchange) Act 2003 [Act 632]

11th Parliament of Malaysia (Total: 56)

- Malaysian Maritime Enforcement Agency Act 2004 [Act 633]
- Protection of New Plant Varieties Act 2004 [Act 634]
- Fees (Marine Parks Malaysia) (Validation) Act 2004 [Act 635]
- Diplomatic Privileges (Vienna Convention) Act 1966 [Act 636]
- Loan (Local) Act 1959 [Act 637]
- National Anti-Drugs Agency Act 2004 [Act 638]
- Finance Act 2004 [Act 639]
- Skills Development Fund Act 2004 [Act 640]
- Chemicals Weapons Convention Act 2005 [Act 641]
- ~~Malaysia Deposit Insurance Corporation Act 2005 [Act 642]~~ ( Repealed by the Malaysia Deposit Insurance Corporation Act 2011 [Act 720] )
- ~~Langkawi International Yachting Companies Act 2005 [Act 643]~~ ( Not yet in force )
- Finance Act 2005 [Act 644]
- National Heritage Act 2005 [Act 645]
- Arbitration Act 2005 [Act 646]
- Animals Act 1953 [Act 647]
- Loan (Local) Act 1957 [Act 648]
- Government Loans (Notice of Trusts) Act 1947 [Act 649]
- Loan (Local) Act 1961 [Act 650]
- Malaysian Health Promotion Board Act 2006 [Act 651]
- National Skills Development Act 2006 [Act 652]
- Akademi Seni Budaya dan Warisan Kebangsaan Act 2006 [Act 653]
- Suruhanjaya Perkhidmatan Air Negara Act 2006 [Act 654]
- Water Services Industry Act 2006 [Act 655]
- Malaysian Pepper Board Act 2006 [Act 656]
- Safeguards Act 2006 [Act 657]
- Electronic Commerce Act 2006 [Act 658]
- International Interests in Mobile Equipment (Aircraft) Act 2006 [Act 659]
- Baselines of Maritime Zones Act 2006 [Act 660]
- Finance Act 2006 [Act 661]
- Retirement Fund Act 2007 [Act 662]
- ~~Building and Common Property (Maintenance and Management) Act 2007 [Act 663]~~ ( Repealed by the Strata Management Act 2013 [Act 757] )
- Iskandar Regional Development Authority Act 2007 [Act 664]
- Malaysia Co-operative Societies Commission Act 2007 [Act 665]
- Malaysian Biofuel Industry Act 2007 [Act 666]
- Labuan Native Title Act 2007 [Act 667]
- Youth Societies and Youth Development Act 2007 [Act 668]
- International Islamic Trade Finance Corporation Act 2007 [Act 669]
- Anti-Trafficking in Persons and Anti-Smuggling of Migrants Act Act 2007 [Act 670]
- Capital Markets and Services Act 2007 [Act 671]
- Solid Waste and Public Cleansing Management Act 2007 [Act 672]
- Solid Waste and Public Cleansing Management Corporation Act 2007 [Act 673]
- ~~Pathology Laboratory Act 2007 [Act 674]~~ ( Not yet in force )
- National Measurement System Act 2007 [Act 675]
- Evidence of Child Witness Act 2007 [Act 676]
- Hire Purchase Registration (Sarawak) (Repeal) Act 2007 [Act 677]
- Biosafety Act 2007 [Act 678]
- Malaysian Qualifications Agency Act 2007 [Act 679]
- Electronic Government Activities Act 2007 [Act 680]
- Widows and Orphans Pension Act 1915 [Act 681]
- University of Malaya Act 1961 [Act 682]
- Finance Act 2007 [Act 683]
- Bank Pertanian Malaysia Berhad Act 2008 [Act 684]
- Persons with Disabilities Act 2008 [Act 685]
- International Trade in Endangered Species Act 2008 [Act 686]
- Northern Corridor Implementation Authority Act 2008 [Act 687]
- East Coast Economic Region Development Council Act 2008 [Act 688]

12th Parliament of Malaysia (Total: 71)

- Geologists Act 2008 [Act 689]
- Salvation Army (Incorporated) Act 1956 [Act 690]
- Emergency (Essential Powers) Act 1964 [Act 691]
- National Kenaf and Tobacco Board Act 2009 [Act 692]
- Finance Act 2009 [Act 693]
- Malaysian Anti-Corruption Commission Act 2009 [Act 694]
- Judicial Appointments Commission Act 2009 [Act 695]
- Witness Protection Act 2009 [Act 696]
- Fees (National Agriculture Training Council) (Validation) Act 2009 [Act 697]
- Feed Act 2009 [Act 698]
- Deoxyribonucleic Acid (DNA) Identification Act 2009 [Act 699]
- Enforcement Agency Integrity Commission Act 2009 [Act 700]

=== 701 – 800 ===
- Central Bank of Malaysia Act 2009 [Act 701]
- Finance Act 2010 [Act 702]
- Judges' Ethics Committee Act 2010 [Act 703]
- Labuan Financial Services and Securities Act 2010 [Act 704]
- Labuan Islamic Financial Services and Securities Act 2010 [Act 705]
- Labuan Foundations Act 2010 [Act 706]
- Labuan Limited Partnerships and Limited Liability Partnerships Act 2010 [Act 707]
- Strategic Trade Act 2010 [Act 708]
- Personal Data Protection Act 2010 [Act 709]
- Credit Reporting Agencies Act 2010 [Act 710]
- Whistleblower Protection Act 2010 [Act 711]
- Competition Act 2010 [Act 712]
- Competition Commission Act 2010 [Act 713]
- Suruhanjaya Pengangkutan Awam Darat Act 2010 [Act 714]
- Land Public Transport Act 2010 [Act 715]
- Wildlife Conservation Act 2010 [Act 716]
- Perbadanan Stadium Malaysia Act 2010 [Act 717]
- Agensi Inovasi Malaysia Act 2010 [Act 718]
- Finance Act 2011 [Act 719]
- Malaysia Deposit Insurance Corporation Act 2011 [Act 720]
- International Islamic Liquidity Management Corporation Act 2011 [Act 721]
- Fees (Malaysian Meteorological Department) (Validation) Act 2011 [Act 722]
- Price Control and Anti-Profiteering Act 2011 [Act 723]
- National Visual Arts Development Board Act 2011 [Act 724]
- Renewable Energy Act 2011 [Act 725]
- Sustainable Energy Development Authority Act 2011 [Act 726]
- Food Analysts Act 2011 [Act 727]
- Malaysian Quarantine and Inspection Services Act 2011 [Act 728]
- National Sports Institute Act 2011 [Act 729]
- Trade Descriptions Act 2011 [Act 730]
- Money Services Business Act 2011 [Act 731]
- National Wages Consultative Council Act 2011 [Act 732]
- Kampong Bharu Development Corporation Act 2011 [Act 733]
- Restricted Residence (Repeal) Act 2011 [Act 734]
- Banishment (Repeal) Act 2011 [Act 735]
- Peaceful Assembly Act 2012 [Act 736]
- Medical Device Act 2012 [Act 737]
- Medical Device Authority Act 2012 [Act 738]
- Perumahan Rakyat 1Malaysia Act 2012 [Act 739]
- Veterans Act 2012 [Act 740]
- Postal Services Act 2012 [Act 741]
- Finance Act 2012 [Act 742]
- Limited Liability Partnerships Act 2012 [Act 743]
- Jasa Perkasa Persekutuan (Remembrance Allowance) Act 2012 [Act 744]
- Pingat Tentera Udara (Remembrance Allowance) Act 2012 [Act 745]
- Construction Industry Payment and Adjudication Act 2012 [Act 746]
- Security Offences (Special Measures) Act 2012 [Act 747]
- Malaysian Institute of Road Safety Research Act 2012 [Act 748]
- Mediation Act 2012 [Act 749]
- Territorial Sea Act 2012 [Act 750]
- Rukun Tetangga Act 2012 [Act 751]
- Malaysia Volunteers Corps Act 2012 [Act 752]
- Minimum Retirement Age Act 2012 [Act 753]
- International Transfer of Prisoners Act 2012 [Act 754]
- Finance Act 2013 [Act 755]
- ~~Traditional and Complementary Medicine Act 2013 [Act 756]~~ ( Has no force of law (See G.N. 5450/2016 dated 10 March 2016) )
- Strata Management Act 2013 [Act 757]
- Financial Services Act 2013 [Act 758]
- Islamic Financial Services Act 2013 [Act 759]

13th Parliament of Malaysia (Total: 45)

- Fees (Department of Museum Malaysia) (Validation) Act 2014 [Act 760]
- Finance Act 2014 [Act 761]
- ~~Goods and Services Tax Act 2014 [Act 762]~~ ( Repealed by the Goods And Services Tax (Repeal) Act 2018 [Act 805] )
- Yayasan Guru Tun Hussein Onn Act 2014 [Act 763]
- Finance (No. 2) Act 2014 [Act 764]
- Malaysian Airline System Berhad (Administration) Act 2015 [Act 765]
- Netting of Financial Agreements Act 2015 [Act 766]
- Public Sector Home Financing Board Act 2015 [Act 767]
- Technologists and Technicians Act 2015 [Act 768]
- Prevention of Terrorism Act 2015 [Act 769]
- Special Measures Against Terrorism in Foreign Countries Act 2015 [Act 770]
- Malaysian Aviation Commission Act 2015 [Act 771]
- Animal Welfare Act 2015 [Act 772]
- Finance Act 2015 [Act 773]
- ~~Allied Health Professions Act 2016 [Act 774]~~ ( Not yet in force )
- Traditional and Complementary Medicine Act 2016 [Act 775]
- National Security Council Act 2016 [Act 776]
- Companies Act 2016 [Act 777]
- Interest Schemes Act 2016 [Act 778]
- Legislature of Sarawak (Application of Monies Borrowed from the Federation) Act 1968 [Act 779]
- BERNAMA Act 1967 [Act 780]
- Redemptorist Fathers (Incorporation) Act 1962 [Act 781]
- Forest Research Institute Malaysia Act 2016 [Act 782]
- Statutory Declarations Act 1960 [Act 783]
- Scouts Association of Malaysia (Incorporation) Act 1968 [Act 784]
- Finance Act 2017 [Act 785]
- Asian Infrastructure Investment Bank Act 2017 [Act 786]
- Offences Relating to Awards 2017 [Act 787]
- Civil Aviation Authority of Malaysia Act 2017 [Act 788]
- Self-Employment Social Security Act 2017 [Act 789]
- Courts (Modes Of Commencement Of Civil Actions) Act 2017 [Act 790]
- Tourism Tax Act 2017 [Act 791]
- Sexual Offences Against Children Act 2017 [Act 792]
- Padi Cultivators (Control of Rent and Security of Tenure) Act 1967 [Act 793] - Revised 2017
- Married Women and Children (Enforcement of Maintenance) Act 1968 [Act 794] - Revised 2017
- ~~Access To Biological Resources and Benefit Sharing Act 2017 [Act 795]~~ (Not yet in force)
- Employment (Restriction) Act 1968 [Act 976] - Revised 2017
- Sabah Ports Authority (Consequential Provisions) Act 1968 [Act 797] - Revised 2017
- Local Authorities (Conditions of Service) Act 1964 [Act 798] - Revised 2017
- Malaysian Border Security Agency Act 2017 [Act 799]
- Employment Insurance System Act 2017 [Act 800]

=== 801 to date ===
- Finance (No. 2) Act 2017 [Act 801]
- ~~Private Aged Healthcare Facilities and Services Act 2018 [Act 802]~~ (Not yet in force)
- Anti-Fake News Act 2018 [Act 803]
- ~~Dental Act 2018 [Act 804]~~ (Not yet in force)

14th Parliament of Malaysia

- Goods and Services (Repeal) Act 2018 [Act 805]
- Sales Tax Act 2018 [Act 806]
- Services Tax Act 2018 [Act 807]
- National Anthem Act 1968 [Act 808] - Revised 2018
- Pool Betting Act 1967 [Act 809] - Revised 2018
- Subang Golf Course Corporation Act 1968 [Act 810] - Revised 2018
- Suruhanjaya Pengangkutan Awam Darat (Dissolution) Act 2018 [Act 811]
- Finance Act 2018 [Act 812]
- Departure Levy Act 2019 [Act 813]
- Syarie Legal Profession (Federal Territories) Act 2019 [Act 814]
- Trademarks Act 2019 [Act 815]
- The Visitor in the Federation of Malaya of the Christian Brothers' Schools (Incorporation) Act 1954 [Act 816] - Revised 2019
- The Lady Superior of the Society of Saint Maur (Incorporation) Act 1955 [Act 817] - Revised 2019
- The Overseas Missionary Fellowship (Incorporation) Act 1957 [Act 818] - Revised 2019
- The Daughters of Charity of the Canossian Institute (Incorporation) Act 1957 [Act 819] - Revised 2019
- The Superior of the Institute of the Franciscan Missionaries of Mary (Incorporation) Act 1957 [Act 820] - Revised 2019
- Penang and Province Wellesley Jubilee Fund Act 1965 [Act 821] - Revised 2019
- National Anti-Financial Crime Centre Act 2019 [Act 822]
- Finance Act 2019 [Act 823]
- Malaysian Health Promotion Board (Dissolution) Act 2019 [Act 824]
- Anti-Fake News (Repeal) Act 2020 [Act 825]
- ~~Food Donors Protection Act 2020 [Act 826]~~ (Not yet in force)
- ~~Currency Act 2020 [Act 827]~~ (Not yet in force)
