= Weights and Measures Act =

A weights and measures act is a kind of legislative act found in many jurisdictions establishing technical standards for weights and measures.

Notable acts of this type include:

- Various Weights and Measures Acts (UK) or the various legislative acts preceding them in England, Wales and Scotland
- R.S. 1985 c. W-6, the Weights and Measures Act, in Canada
- Act No.XXXI of 1871, the Act to Regulate the Weights and Measures of Capacity of British India
- Act No.8 of 1936, the Irish Weights and Measures Act
- The Weights and Measures Act 1972, in Malaysia

The Weights and Measures Acts may refer to:

- The Weights and Measures Acts of the United Kingdom, particularly the Weights and Measures Acts of 1878 to 1893
- The Weights and Measures Acts of Ireland, from 1878 to 1936
- The Weights and Measures Acts of India, from 1871 to 1889
- The Weights and Measures Act 1987 of New Zealand

Weights and measures acts may also refer to similar legislation in other countries.

In the United States, the National Conference on Weights and Measures functions as a regular meeting of the states and maintains several handbooks which are available at the website of the National Institute of Standards and Technology. Most of the states have enacted these handbooks into law.

== See also ==
- History of the metric system
