= Arbitration Act 2005 =

Parliament of Malaysia
- Long title: An Act to reform the law relating to domestic arbitration, provide for international arbitration, the recognition and enforcement of awards and for related matters.
- Citation: Act 646
- Territorial extent: Throughout Malaysia
- Passed by: Dewan Rakyat
- Passed: 7 December 2005
- Passed by: Dewan Negara
- Passed: 22 December 2005
- Royal assent: 30 December 2005
- Commenced: 31 December 2005
- Effective: [15 Mac 2006; P.U. (B) 65/2006]

Legislative history

First chamber: Dewan Rakyat
- Bill title: Arbitration Bill 2005
- Bill citation: D.R. 30/2005
- Introduced by: M. Kayveas, Deputy Minister in the Prime Minister's Department
- First reading: 5 December 2005
- Second reading: 7 December 2005
- Third reading: 7 December 2005

Second chamber: Dewan Negara
- Bill title: Arbitration Bill 2005
- Bill citation: D.R. 30/2005
- Member(s) in charge: [[]], Minister of
- First reading: 8 December 2005
- Second reading: 21 December 2005
- Third reading: 22 December 2005

Amended by
- Arbitration (Amendment) Act 2011 [Act A1395]

Related legislation
- Arbitration Act 1952 [Act 93] Convention on the Recognition and Enforcement of Foreign Arbitral Awards Act 1985 [Act 320]
- Status: In force

The Arbitration Act 2005 (Malay: Akta Timbang Tara 2005) is a Malaysian law that was enacted to reform the law relating to domestic arbitration, provide for international arbitration, recognize and enforce awards, and deal with related matters.

== Structure ==
The Arbitration Act 2005, in its current form (1 July 2011), consists of 4 Parts containing 51 sections and no schedule (including 1 amendment).

- Part I: Preliminary
- Part II: Arbitration
  - Chapter 1: General Provisions
  - Chapter 2: Arbitration Agreement
  - Chapter 3: Composition of Arbitrators
  - Chapter 4: Jurisdiction of Arbitral Tribunal
  - Chapter 5: Conduct of Arbitral Proceedings
  - Chapter 6: Making of Award and Termination of Proceedings
  - Chapter 7: Recourse Against Award
  - Chapter 8: Recognition and Enforcement of Awards
- Part III: Additional Provisions Relating to Arbitration
- Part IV: Miscellaneous
