= Capital Markets and Services Act 2007 =

Act of Malaysia

Parliament of Malaysia
- Long title: An Act to consolidate the Securities Industry Act 1983 [Act 280] and Futures Industry Act 1993 [Act 499], to regulate and to provide for matters relating to the activities, markets and intermediaries in the capital markets, and for matters consequential and incidental thereto.
- Citation: Act 671
- Territorial extent: Throughout Malaysia
- Passed by: Dewan Rakyat
- Passed: 10 May 2007
- Passed by: Dewan Negara
- Passed: 24 May 2007
- Royal assent: 27 July 2007
- Commenced: 31 July 2007
- Effective: 28 September 2007 [All provisions of the Act except Division 2 of Part VI – P.U.(B) 342/2007] 1 April 2010 [Division 2 of Part VI of the Act comes into operation – P.U.(B) 143/2010]

Legislative history

First chamber: Dewan Rakyat
- Bill title: Capital Markets and Services Bill 2007
- Bill citation: D.R. 11/2007
- Introduced by: Awang Adek Hussin, Deputy Minister of Finance
- First reading: 7 May 2007
- Second reading: 10 May 2007
- Third reading: 10 May 2007

Second chamber: Dewan Negara
- Bill title: Capital Markets and Services Bill 2007
- Bill citation: D.R. 11/2007
- Member(s) in charge: Awang Adek Hussin, Deputy Minister of Finance
- First reading: 14 May 2007
- Second reading: 24 May 2007
- Third reading: 24 May 2007

Amended by
- Capital Markets And Services (Amendment) Act 2010 [Act A1370] Capital Markets And Services (Amendment) Act 2011 [Act A1406] Capital Markets And Services (Amendment) Act 2012 [Act A1437] Capital Markets and Services (Amendment) Act 2015 [Act 1499]

Related legislation
- Securities Industry Act 1983 [Act 280] Futures Industry Act 1993 [Act 499]
- Status: In force

The Capital Markets and Services Act 2007 (Malay: Akta Pasaran Modal Dan Perkhidmatan 2007), is an Act of the Parliament of Malaysia which was enacted to consolidate the Securities Industry Act 1983 [Act 280] and Futures Industry Act 1993 [Act 499], to regulate and to provide for matters relating to the activities, markets and intermediaries in the capital markets, and for matters consequential and incidental thereto.

Provisions of the Act include the regulation of company takeovers and mergers and the provision of civil remedies for fraud victims.

== Structure ==
The Capital Markets and Services Act 2007, in its current form (15 September 2015), consists of 13 Parts containing 394 sections and 11 schedules (including 4 amendments).

== Bibliography ==
- Shanti Geoffrey. Capital Market Laws of Malaysia. LexisNexis. 2010. Berkeley Law Library. APU. UniSZA. Second Edition. 2020. Passim, but see particularly chapter 2 ("Introduction to the Capital Markets and Services Act 2007") and chapter 10 ("Administration of the Capital Markets and Services Act 2007").
- Legal Research Board (compiler). Capital Markets and Services Act 2007 (Act 671). International Law Book Services. 2007. Berkeley Law Library. 2010. Catalog. 2014. Catalog. 2022.
- Kabir Hassan and Michael Mahlknecht. "Capital Markets and Services Act 2007 (Act 671)". Islamic Capital Markets. Wiley. (John Wiley and Sons Ltd). 2011. Section 4.2.1.1 at page 93. See also chapter 4 at pages 91 to 106, and see pages 224 to 233.
