= Malaysian Anti-Corruption Commission Act 2009 =

National law

Parliament of Malaysia
- Long title: An Act to provide for the establishment of the Malaysian Anti-Corruption Commission, to make further and better provisions for the prevention of corruption and for matters necessary thereto and connected therewith.
- Citation: Act 694
- Territorial extent: Throughout Malaysia
- Passed by: Dewan Rakyat
- Passed: 16 December 2008
- Passed by: Dewan Negara
- Passed: 22 December 2008
- Royal assent: 6 January 2009
- Commenced: 8 January 2009
- Effective: 1 January 2009

Legislative history

First chamber: Dewan Rakyat
- Bill title: Malaysian Anti-Corruption Commission Bill 2008
- Bill citation: D.R. 21/2008
- Introduced by: Mohamed Nazri Abdul Aziz, Minister in the Prime Minister's Department
- First reading: 10 December 2008
- Second reading: 15 December 2008
- Third reading: 16 December 2008

Second chamber: Dewan Negara
- Bill title: Malaysian Anti-Corruption Commission Bill 2008
- Bill citation: D.R. 21/2008
- Member(s) in charge: Mohamed Nazri Abdul Aziz, Minister in the Prime Minister's Department
- First reading: 18 December 2008
- Second reading: 22 December 2008
- Third reading: 22 December 2008

Related legislation
- Anti-Corruption Act 1997 [Act 575]
- Status: In force

The Malaysian Anti-Corruption Commission Act 2009 (Malay: Akta Suruhanjaya Pencegahan Rasuah Malaysia 2009) is an Act of the Parliament of Malaysia. It was enacted to provide for the establishment of the Malaysian Anti-Corruption Commission, to make further and better provisions for the prevention of corruption and for matters necessary thereto and connected therewith.

== Structure ==
The Malaysian Anti-Corruption Commission Act 2009, in its current form (8 January 2009), consists of 9 Parts containing 74 sections and 1 schedule (including no amendment).

- Part I: Preliminary
- Part II: The Malaysian Anti-Corruption Commission
- Part III: Provisions on advisory board, Special Committee and Complaints Committee
- Part IV: Offences and Penalties
- Part V: Investigation, Search, Seizure and Arrest
- Part VI: Evidence
- Part VII: Prosecution and Trial of Offences
- Part VIII: General
- Part IX: Repeal and Saving
- Schedule
