= Members of Parliament (Remuneration) Act 1980 =

Parliament of Malaysia
- Long title: An Act to provide for the remuneration of Members of Parliament and for other matters incidental thereto or connected therewith.
- Citation: Act 237
- Territorial extent: Throughout Malaysia
- Passed by: Dewan Rakyat
- Passed: 18 June 1980
- Passed by: Dewan Negara
- Passed: 24 June 1980
- Royal assent: 31 July 1980
- Commenced: 7 August 1980
- Effective: 1 July 1980

Legislative history

First chamber: Dewan Rakyat
- Bill title: Members of Parliament (Remuneration) Bill 1980
- Introduced by: Hussein Onn, Prime Minister
- First reading: 10 June 1980
- Second reading: 18 June 1980
- Third reading: 18 June 1980

Second chamber: Dewan Negara
- Bill title: Members of Parliament (Remuneration) Bill 1980
- Member(s) in charge: Tengku Razaleigh Hamzah, Minister of Finance
- First reading: 23 June 1980
- Second reading: 23 June 1980
- Third reading: 24 June 1980

Amended by
- Members of Parliament (Remuneration) (Amendment) Act 1981 [Act A504] Members of Parliament (Modification of Pensions and Gratuities) Order 1981 [P.U. (A) 188/1981] Members of Parliament (Remuneration) (Amendment of First Schedule) Order 1981 [P.U. (A) 216/1981] Members of Parliament 29-06-1984 (Remuneration) (Amendment) Act 1984 [Act A594] Members of Parliament (Remuneration) (Amendment of First Schedule) Order 1984 [P.U. (A) 342/1984] Members of Parliament (Remuneration) (Amendment of First Schedule) Order 1990 [P.U. (A) 159/1990] Members of Parliament (Remuneration) (Amendment) Act 1992 [Act A819] Members of Parliament (Remuneration) (Amendment) (No. 2) Act 1992 [Act A821] Members of Parliament (Remuneration) (Amendment of First Schedule) Order 1996 [P.U. (A) 128/1996] Members of Parliament (Remuneration) (Amendment) Act 1997 [Act A984] Members of Parliament (Remuneration) (Amendment) Act 1997 [Act A1003] Members of Parliament (Remuneration) (Amendment of First Schedule) Order 2000 [P.U. (A) 410/2000] Members of Parliament (Remuneration) (Amendment) Act 2001 [Act A1097] Members of Parliament (Remuneration) (Amendment) (No.2) Act 2001 [Act A1133] Members of Parliament (Remuneration) (Amendment) Act 2002 [Act A1173] Members of Parliament (Remuneration) (Amendment of First Schedule) Order 2003 [P.U. (A) 150/2003] Members of Parliament (Remuneration) (Amendment of First Sehedule) (No. 2) Order 2003 [P.U. (A) 159/2003] Members of Parliament (Remuneration) (Amendment of First Schedule) (No. 3) Order 2003 [P.U. (A) 236/2003] Members of Parliament (Remuneration) (Amendment) Act 2005 [Act A1244]

Related legislation
- Ministers (Remuneration) Ordinance 1957 [Ord. 63 of 1957] President of the Senate (Remuneration) Act 1960 [Act 2 of 1960] Parliament (Members’ Remuneration) Act 1960 [Act 4 of 1960] Deputy Ministers Act 1960 [Act 5 of 1960] Speaker (Remuneration) Act 1960 [Act 7 of 1960] Parliamentary Secretaries (Remuneration) Act 1965 [Act 32 of 1965] Members of the Administration and Members of Parliament (Pensions and Gratuities) Act 1971 [Act 23]

Keywords
- Member of Parliament, remuneration
- Status: In force

The Members of Parliament (Remuneration) Act 1980 (Malay: Akta Ahli Parlimen (Saraan) 1980), is a Malaysian law which was enacted to provide for the remuneration of Members of Parliament and for other matters incidental thereto or connected therewith.

== Structure ==
The Members of Parliament (Remuneration) Act 1980, in its current form (1 January 2006), consists of only 14 sections and 2 schedules (including 19 amendments), without separate Parts.

- Section 1: Short title
- Section 2: Interpretation
- Section 3: Remuneration of Members of Parliament
- Section 4: Remuneration of President of Senate, Speaker, etc.
- Section 5: Other allowances and privileges for persons under sections 3 and 4
- Section 6: Remuneration of Members of the Administration
- Section 7: Commencement of salaries and allowances
- Section 8: Pensions and gratuities
- Section 9: Accident benefits
- Section 10: Reduction of allowances by Parliament
- Section 11: Provision against duplicate salaries
- Section 12: Moneys to be provided or charged
- Section 13: Repeal and savings
- Section 14: Repeal
- Schedules
