= Weights and Measures Act 1972 =

Parliament of Malaysia
- Long title: An Act to establish units of measurement and standards of mass and measure based on the International System of Units, to regulate weights and measures and instruments for weighing and measuring and to make provisions for matters connected therewith and ancillary thereto.
- Citation: Act 71
- Territorial extent: Throughout Malaysia
- Enacted by: Dewan Rakyat
- Enacted by: Dewan Negara
- Royal assent: 23 March 1972
- Commenced: 30 March 1972
- Effective: 1st January 1981 [P.U. (B) 1/1981]

Legislative history

First chamber: Dewan Rakyat
- Bill title: Weights and Measures Bill 1971
- Introduced by: Khir Johari, Minister of Commerce and Industry
- First reading: 8 December 1971
- Second reading: 8 February 1972
- Third reading: 8 February 1972

Second chamber: Dewan Negara
- Bill title: Weights and Measures Bill 1971
- Member(s) in charge: , Minister of
- First reading: [ ]
- Second reading: [ ]
- Third reading: [ ]

Amended by
- Weights and Measures (Amendment) Act 1981 [Act A522] Weights and Measures (Repeal of Laws) Orders 1981 [P.U.(A) 293/81] Weights and Measures (Amendment of First and Third Schedules) Notification 1985 [P.U.(A) 392/85] Weights and Measures (Amendment) Act 1990 [Act A754] Weights and Measures (Amendment) Act 1992 [Act A825] Weights and Measures (Amendment) Act 2002 [Act A1180] Weights and Measures (Amendment) Act 2007 [Act A1309]

Related legislation
- Metric Weights and Measures Act 1971 [Act 40]
- Status: In force

The Weights and Measures Act 1972 (Malay: Akta Timbang dan Sukat 1972) is an Act of the Parliament of Malaysia. It was enacted to establish units of measurement and standards of mass and measure based on the International System of Units, to regulate weights and measures and instruments for weighing and measuring and to make provisions for matters connected therewith and ancillary thereto.

== Structure ==
The Weights and Measures Act 1972, in its current form (1 January 2009), consists of 5 Parts containing 35 sections and 4 schedules (including 7 amendments).

- Part I: Preliminary
- Part II: Units of Measurement
- Part III: Weights and Measures for Trade Purposes
- Part IV: Administration
- Part V: General
- Schedules

== See also ==
- Weights and Measures Act
