= Copyright Act 1987 (Malaysia) =

Parliament of Malaysia
- Long title: An Act to make better provisions in the law relating to copyright and for other matters connected therewith.
- Citation: Act 332
- Territorial extent: Throughout Malaysia
- Passed by: Dewan Rakyat
- Passed: 20 March 1987
- Passed by: Dewan Negara
- Passed: 27 March 1987
- Royal assent: 30 April 1987
- Commenced: 21 May 1987
- Effective: [1 December 1987, P.U.(B) 586/1987]

Legislative history

First chamber: Dewan Rakyat
- Bill title: Copyright Bill 1987
- Bill citation: D.R. 03/1987
- Introduced by: Kok Wee Kiat, Deputy Minister of Commerce and Industry
- First reading: 16 March 1987
- Second reading: 19 March 1987
- Third reading: 20 March 1987

Second chamber: Dewan Negara
- Bill title: Copyright Bill 1987
- Bill citation: D.R. 03/1987
- Member(s) in charge: Kok Wee Kiat, Deputy Minister of Commerce and Industry
- First reading: 23 March 1987
- Second reading: 27 March 1987
- Third reading: 27 March 1987

Amended by
- Copyright (Amendment) Act 1990 [Act A775] Copyright (Amendment) Act 1996 [Act A952] Copyright (Amendment) Act 1997 [Act A994] Copyright (Amendment) Act 2000 [Act A1082] Copyright (Amendment) Act 2002 [Act A1139] Revision of Laws (Rectification of Copyright Act 1987) Order 2003 [P.U. (A) 277/2003] Copyright (Amendment) Act 2003 [Act A1195] Copyright Act 1987-Corrigendum [P.U. (B) 508/2010] Copyright (Amendment) Act 2012 [Act A1420]

Related legislation
- Copyright Act 1969 [Act 10]

Keywords
- Copyright
- Status: In force

The Copyright Act 1987 (Malaysia) (Malay: Akta Hakcipta 1987) (Act No. 332), as amended up to Act No. A1420, was enacted to modernize Malaysia's copyright laws, superseding the Imperial Copyright Act 1911 which was previously applicable in British Malaya and the British Empire.

This legislative overhaul was aimed at enhancing legal frameworks to support the growth and dissemination of creative works in alignment with international standards. The act came into force on December 1, 1987, after being assented to on April 30, 1987.

The consolidated version, which includes amendments up to the Copyright (Amendment) Act 2012 (Act No. A1420), reflects the continuous updates made to accommodate evolving copyright needs.

== Structure ==
The Copyright Act 1987, in its current form (1 July 2012), consists of 8 parts containing 61 sections and no schedule (including 9 amendments).

- Part I: Preliminary
- Part II: General Provisions
- Part III: Nature and Duration of Copyright
- Part IV: Ownership and Assignment of Copyright
- Part IVA: Copyright Licensing
- Part V: Copyright Tribunal
- Part VI: Remedies for Infringements and Offences
- Part VIA: Anti-Camcording
- Part VIB: Limitation of Liabilities of the Service Provider
- Part VII: Enforcement
- Part VIII: Miscellaneous

== See also ==
- Copyright Act
