= Strata Management Act 2013 =

Parliament of Malaysia
- Long title: An Act to provide for the proper maintenance and management of buildings and common property, and for related matters.
- Citation: Act 757
- Territorial extent: Throughout Peninsular Malaysia and Federal Territory of Labuan
- Passed by: Dewan Rakyat
- Passed: 26 November 2012
- Passed by: Dewan Negara
- Passed: 19 December 2012
- Royal assent: 5 February 2013
- Commenced: 8 February 2013
- Effective: Peninsular Malaysia except Penang–1 June 2015 [P.U. (B) 231/2015]; Federal Territories–1 June 2015 [P.U. (B) 237/2015]; Penang–12 June 2015 [P.U. (B) 248/2015]

Legislative history

First chamber: Dewan Rakyat
- Bill title: Strata Management Bill 2012
- Bill citation: D.R. 32/2012
- Introduced by: Chor Chee Heung, Minister of Housing and Local Government
- First reading: 24 September 2012
- Second reading: 26 September 2012
- Third reading: 26 November 2012

Second chamber: Dewan Negara
- Bill title: Strata Management Bill 2012
- Bill citation: D.R. 32/2012
- Member(s) in charge: Chor Chee Heung, Minister of Housing and Local Government
- First reading: 3 December 2012
- Second reading: 19 December 2012
- Third reading: 19 December 2012

Related legislation
- Strata Titles Act 1985 [Act 318] Building and Common Property (Maintenance and Management) Act 2007 [Act 663]

Keywords
- Strata management
- Status: In force

The Strata Management Act 2013 (Malay: Akta Pengurusan Strata 2013), is a Malaysian laws which enacted to provide for the proper maintenance and management of buildings and common property, and for related matters.

== Preamble ==
WHEREAS it is expedient for the purposes only of ensuring uniformity of law and policy with respect to local government to make laws relating to the maintenance and management of buildings and common property within Peninsular Malaysia and the Federal Territory of Labuan

== Structure ==
The Strata Management Act 2013, in its current form (8 February 2013), consists of 11 Parts containing 153 sections and 4 schedules (including no amendment).

- Part I: Preliminary
- Part II: Administration of the Act
- Part III: Dealings in Building or Land Intended for Subdivision into Parcels
- Part IV: Strata Management before Existence of Management Corporation
  - Chapter 1: General
  - Chapter 2: Management by developer before joint management body is established
  - Chapter 3: Management by joint management body
  - Chapter 4: Miscellaneous provisions applicable to this Part
  - Chapter 5: Transitional and saving provisions due to the repeal of the Building and Common Property (Maintenance and Management) Act 2007
- Part V: Strata Management after Existence of Management Corporation
  - Chapter 1: General
  - Chapter 2: Management by developer before first annual general meeting of management corporation
  - Chapter 3: Management by developer after first annual general meeting of management corporation
  - Chapter 4: Subsidiary management corporation and limited common property
  - Chapter 5: Miscellaneous provision applicable to this Part
  - Chapter 6: Transitional and saving provisions due to consequential amendments to the Strata Titles Act 1985
- Part VI: Managing Agent
- Part VII: Deposit to Rectify Defects
- Part VIII: Insurances
- Part IX: Disputes and Strata Management Tribunal
  - Chapter 1: General
  - Chapter 2: Establishment and organization
  - Chapter 3: Jurisdiction of Tribunal
  - Chapter 4: Conduct of proceedings
  - Chapter 5: Awards of Tribunal
  - Chapter 6: Miscellaneous provisions applicable to this Part
- Part X: Enforcement
- Part XI: Miscellaneous
- Schedules

== Management responsibilities ==
The developer is responsible to maintain and manage the building intended for strata title subdivisions during the first year after vacant possession (developer's management period). Within that one year, the developer shall call for an Annual General Meeting of all proprietors, during which, the Joint Management Body (JMB) is formed. The JMB comprises the proprietors and the developer. The Committee members appointed by the proprietors during the General Meeting and the developer forms the Joint Management Committee (JMC). The JMC acts on behalf of the JMB who has the responsibility to maintain and manage the building pending the issuance of individual strata titles. After strata titles are issued by the Land Office, the developer is responsible to call for the first Annual General Meeting of the Management Corporation. The Corporation appoints its Committee members during the General Meeting known as the Management Committee (MC). The Management Corporation and the Management Committee do not include the developer.
