= Islamic Financial Services Act 2013 =

Malaysian law

Parliament of Malaysia
- Long title: An Act to provide for the regulation and supervision of Islamic financial institutions, payment systems and other relevant entities and the oversight of the Islamic money market and Islamic foreign exchange market to promote financial stability and compliance with Shariah and for related, consequential or incidental matters.
- Citation: Act 759
- Territorial extent: Throughout Malaysia
- Passed by: Dewan Rakyat
- Passed: 28 November 2012
- Passed by: Dewan Negara
- Passed: 19 December 2012
- Royal assent: 18 March 2013
- Commenced: 22 March 2013
- Effective: [30 June 2013, P.U. (B) 277/2013; 1 January 2015, P.U. (B) 553/2014]

Legislative history

First chamber: Dewan Rakyat
- Bill title: Islamic Financial Services Bill 2012
- Bill citation: D.R. 41/2012
- Introduced by: Awang Adek Hussin, Deputy Minister of Finance
- First reading: 22 November 2012
- Second reading: 27 November 2012
- Third reading: 28 November 2012

Second chamber: Dewan Negara
- Bill title: Islamic Financial Services Bill 2012
- Bill citation: D.R. 41/2012
- Member(s) in charge: Awang Adek Hussin, Deputy Minister of Finance
- First reading: 3 December 2012
- Second reading: 19 December 2012
- Third reading: 19 December 2012

Related legislation
- Islamic Banking Act 1983 [Act 276] Takaful Act 1984 [Act 312]
- Status: In force

The Islamic Financial Services Act 2013 (Malay: Akta Perkhidmatan Kewangan Islam 2013), is a Malaysian law which enacted to provide for the regulation and supervision of Islamic financial institutions, payment systems and other relevant entities and the oversight of the Islamic money market and Islamic foreign exchange market to promote financial stability and compliance with Shariah and for related, consequential or incidental matters.

== Structure ==
The Islamic Financial Services Act 2013, in its current form (22 March 2013), consists of 18 Parts containing 291 sections and 16 schedules (including no amendment).

- Part I: Preliminary
- Part II: Regulatory Objectives and Powers and Functions of Bank
- Part III: Authorization
- Part IV: Shariah Requirements
- Part V: Payment Systems
- Part VI: Prudential Requirements
- Part VII: Ownership, Control and Transfer of Business
- Part VIII: Financial Groups
- Part IX: Business Conduct and Consumer Protection
- Part X: Islamic Money Market and Islamic Foreign Exchange Market
- Part XI: Submission of Document or Information
- Part XII: Examination
- Part XIII: Directions of Compliance
- Part XIV: Intervention and Remedial Action
- Part XV: Other Powers of Bank
- Part XVI: Enforcement and Penalties
- Part XVII: General Provisions
- Part XVIII: Repeal, Savings and Transitional
- Schedules
