= Communications and Multimedia Act 1998 =

Act of the Parliament of Malaysia

Parliament of Malaysia
- Long title: An Act to provide for and to regulate the converging communications and multimedia industries, and for incidental matters. .
- Citation: Act 588
- Territorial extent: Throughout Malaysia
- Passed by: Dewan Rakyat
- Passed: 21 July 1998
- Passed by: Dewan Negara
- Passed: 10 August 1998
- Royal assent: 23 September 1998
- Commenced: 15 October 1998
- Effective: [1 April 1999, P.U. (B) 128/1999—except ss. 157, 159-162, 164-171, 176, 178, 197 & 198; 1 April 2000, P.U. (B) 106/2000—ss. 157, 159-162, 164-171, 176 & 178]

Legislative history

Initiating chamber: Dewan Rakyat
- Bill title: Communications and Multimedia Bill 1998
- Bill citation: D.R. 15/1998
- Introduced by: Leo Moggie Irok, Minister of Energy, Telecommunications and Posts
- First reading: 13 July 1998
- Second reading: 20 July 1998
- Third reading: 21 July 1998

Revising chamber: Dewan Negara
- Bill title: Communications and Multimedia Bill 1998
- Bill citation: D.R. 15/1998
- Member(s) in charge: Chan Kong Choy, Deputy Minister of Energy, Telecommunications and Posts
- First reading: 3 August 1998
- Second reading: 5 August 1998
- Third reading: 6 August 1998

Amended by
- Communications and Multimedia (Amendment) Act 2004 [Act A1220]

Related legislation
- Telecommunications Act 1950 [Act 20] Broadcasting Act 1988 [Act 338]
- Status: In force

The Communications and Multimedia Act 1998 (Malay: Akta Komunikasi dan Multimedia 1998) is an Act of the Parliament of Malaysia. It was enacted to provide for and to regulate the converging communications and multimedia industries, and for incidental matters.

== Structure ==
The Communications and Multimedia Act 1998, in its current form (1 January 2006), consists of 11 Parts containing 282 sections and 1 schedule (including 1 amendment).

- Part I: Preliminary
- Part II: Ministerial Powers and Procedures
  - Chapter 1: Ministerial Direction
  - Chapter 2: Ministerial Determination
  - Chapter 3: Ministerial Declaration
  - Chapter 4: Ministerial Regulations
- Part III: Appeal Tribunal
- Part IV: Licences
  - Chapter 1: Individual Licence
  - Chapter 2: Class Licence
- Part V: Powers and Procedures of the Malaysian Communications and Multimedia Commission
  - Chapter 1: Directions
  - Chapter 2: Determination
  - Chapter 3: Inquiry
  - Chapter 4: Investigation for Purposes of Administration, Inquiry, etc.
  - Chapter 5: Information-gathering Powers
  - Chapter 6: Register
  - Chapter 7: Notification and Resolution of Disputes
  - Chapter 8: Registration of Agreements
  - Chapter 9: Voluntary Industry Codes
  - Chapter 10: Mandatory Standards
  - Chapter 11: Undertakings
  - Chapter 12: Regulatory Forbearance
  - Chapter 13: Review of Decisions
  - Chapter 14: Regulatory Review
  - Chapter 15: Monitoring and Reporting
- Part VI: Economic Regulation
  - Chapter 1: Licensing
  - Chapter 2: General Competition Practices
  - Chapter 3: Access to Services
- Part VII: Technical Regulation
  - Chapter 1: Spectrum Assignment
  - Chapter 2: Numbering and Electronic Addressing
  - Chapter 3: Technical Standards
- Part VIII: Consumer Protection
  - Chapter 1: Quality of Service
  - Chapter 2: Required Applications Services
  - Chapter 3: Resolution of Consumer Disputes
  - Chapter 4: Rate Regulation
  - Chapter 5: Universal Service Provision
- Part IX: Social Regulation
  - Chapter 1: Licensing
  - Chapter 2: Content Requirements
- Part X: General
  - Chapter 1: Installation of Network Facilities, Access to Network Facilities, etc.
  - Chapter 2: Additional Offences and Penalties
  - Chapter 3: Powers of Entry, Investigation into Offences and Prosecution
  - Chapter 4: National Interest Matters
  - Chapter 5: Miscellaneous
- Part XI: Transitional Provisions
  - Chapter 1: Repeal and Savings
  - Chapter 2: Transitional Provisions for Licences
- Schedule
