= Financial Services Act 2013 =

Malaysian law

Parliament of Malaysia
- Long title: An Act to provide for the regulation and supervision of financial institutions, payment systems and other relevant entities and the oversight of the money market and foreign exchange market to promote financial stability and for related, consequential or incidental matters.
- Citation: Act 758
- Territorial extent: Throughout Malaysia
- Passed by: Dewan Rakyat
- Passed: 27 November 2012
- Passed by: Dewan Negara
- Passed: 19 December 2012
- Royal assent: 18 March 2013
- Commenced: 22 March 2013
- Effective: [30 June 2013, P.U. (B) 276/2013; s.129 and Schedule 9–1 January 2015, P.U. (B) 552/2014]

Legislative history

First chamber: Dewan Rakyat
- Bill title: Financial Services Bill 2012
- Bill citation: D.R. 40/2012
- Introduced by: Awang Adek Hussin, Deputy Minister of Finance
- First reading: 22 November 2012
- Second reading: 27 November 2012
- Third reading: 27 November 2012

Second chamber: Dewan Negara
- Bill title: Financial Services Bill 2012
- Bill citation: D.R. 40/2012
- Member(s) in charge: Awang Adek Hussin, Deputy Minister of Finance
- First reading: 3 December 2012
- Second reading: 18 December 2012
- Third reading: 19 December 2012

Related legislation
- Banking and Financial Institutions Act 1989 [Act 372] Exchange Control Act 1953 [Act 17] Insurance Act 1996 [Act 553] Payment Systems Act 2003 [Act 627]
- Status: In force

The Financial Services Act 2013 (Malay: Akta Perkhidmatan Kewangan 2013), is a Malaysian law which was enacted to provide for the regulation and supervision of financial institutions, payment systems and other relevant entities and the oversight of the money market and foreign exchange market to promote financial stability and for related, consequential or incidental matters.

== Structure ==
The Financial Services Act 2013, in its current form (22 March 2013), consists of 18 Parts containing 281 sections and 16 schedules (including no amendment).

- Part I: Preliminary
- Part II: Regulatory Objectives and Powers and Functions of Bank
- Part III: Authorization and Registration
- Part IV: Payment Systems
- Part V: Prudential Requirements
- Part VI: Ownership, Control and Transfer of Business
- Part VII: Financial Groups
- Part VIII: Business Conduct and Consumer Protection
- Part IX: Money Market and Foreign Exchange Market
- Part X: Submission of Document or Information
- Part XI: Examination
- Part XII: Directions of Compliance
- Part XIII: Intervention and Remedial Action
- Part XIV: Other Powers of Bank
- Part XV: Enforcement and Penalties
- Part XVI: General Provisions
- Part XVIII: Repeal, Savings and Transitional
- Schedules
