= Law enforcement in Malaysia =

Law enforcement in Malaysia is performed by numerous law enforcement agencies and primarily the responsibility of the Royal Malaysia Police. Although Malaysia is a federation, criminal matters and majority of law enforcement bodies are placed under the jurisdiction of federal government by the Malaysian Constitution. State or local governments often play limited roles in law enforcement, and its powers were restricted to matters such as land, forestry, and hawkers. Below are some of the law enforcement bodies and agencies of Malaysia.

== Police forces ==
=== Royal Malaysia Police ===
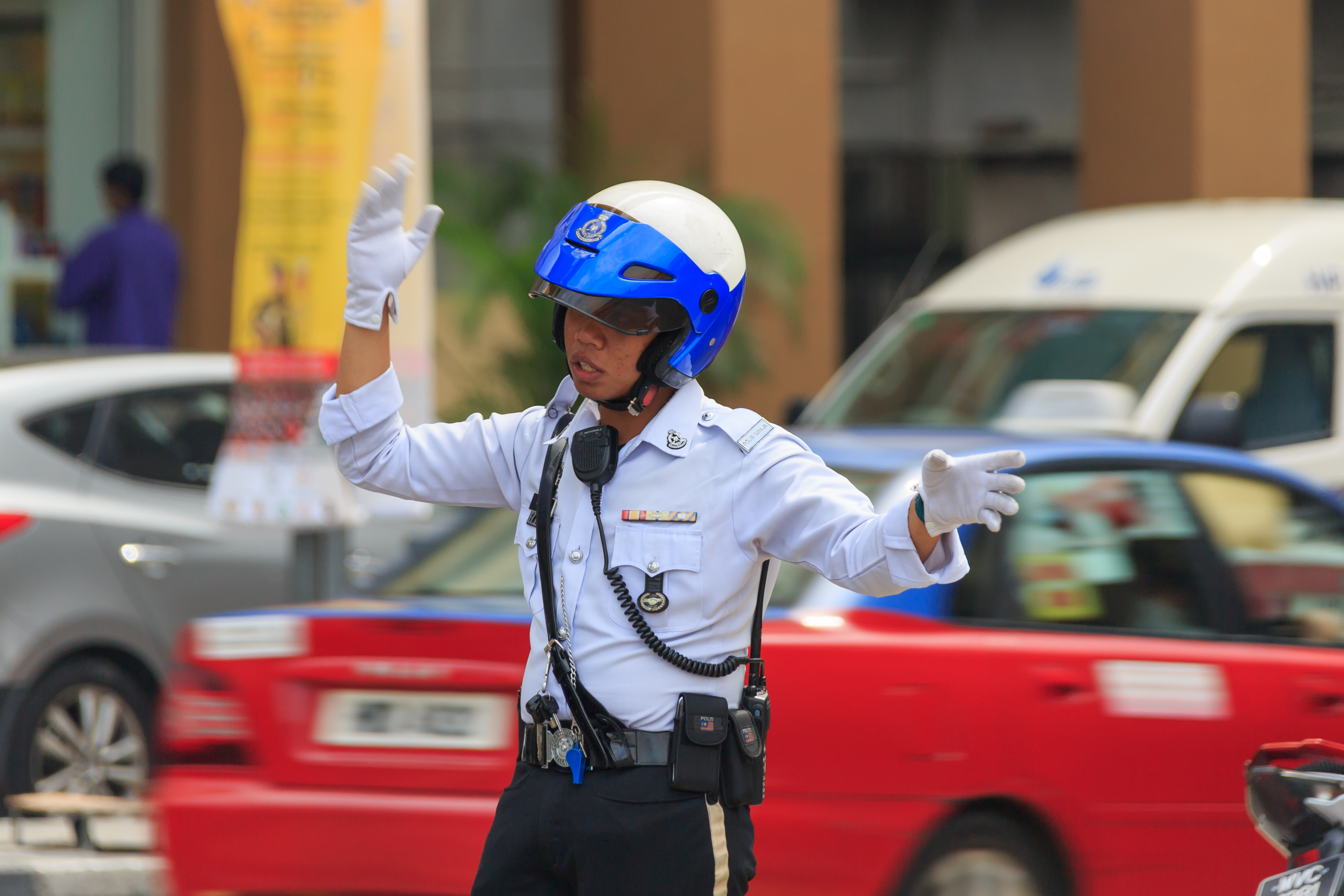
Traffic police officer regulating the traffic at intersection Jalan Pudu / Jalan Imbi.

The Royal Malaysia Police (RMP) is the main agency tasked with maintaining law and order in Malaysia. The force is a centralized organization with responsibilities ranging from traffic control to intelligence gathering. Its headquarters is located at Bukit Aman, Kuala Lumpur. The constitution, control, employment, recruitment, fund, discipline, duties and powers of the police force is specified and governed by the Police Act 1967.

The Royal Malaysia Police is controlled by the Ministry of Home Affairs. RMP have six departments involved in crime and terrorism prevention, and two departments involved in administration. All departments are led by a director with the rank of Commissioner of Police (Equivalent to the rank of Three Stars General or Lieutenant-General in the Army).

==== Sub-police units ====
Under the Royal Malaysia Police, other than full-time police, the RMP also employed auxiliary police, volunteer police, and police cadet.

An auxiliary police in RMP refers to sworn security police serving in other government agencies and key government-linked companies or entities, such as Malaysian Airports Holdings Berhad, Petroleum Nasional Berhad (Petronas), Pos Malaysia Berhad, and Malayan Railways.

As for the Police Volunteer Reserve (PVR) in RMP which was formed in 1952, it is a special police as well as a supporting unit of the full-time RMP forces, where professionals, entrepreneur or private sector employees and other civil servant could join the volunteer reserve unit to help maintain peace and security of their respective formation. PVR is also governed by the same Police Act 1967.

Another police volunteer unit under the RMP is the Police Undergraduate Voluntary Corps or SUKSIS, which is opened for undergraduates in public universities. Its members are required to undergoing periodic training for three years in their respective university and will be commissioned as Inspector SUKSIS by the Inspector General of Police at the end of their training. They are considered as volunteer police and has the same powers as full-time police, if they were mobilized or assigned to police duties.

== Coast guards ==
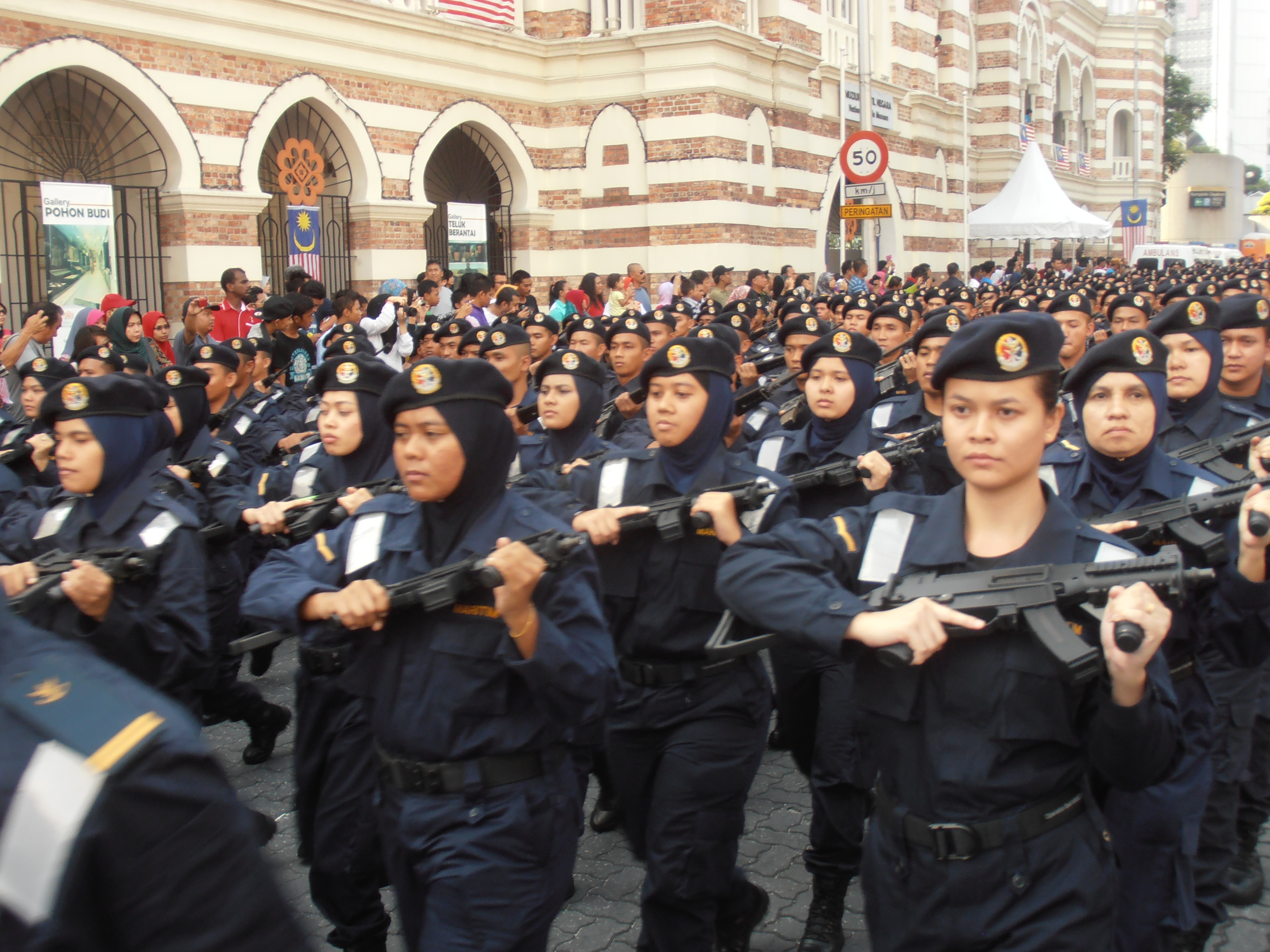
Female officers of MMEA.

=== Malaysian Maritime Enforcement Agency ===
The Malaysian Maritime Enforcement Agency is the principal government agency tasked with maintaining law and order and co-ordinating search and rescue operations in the Malaysian Maritime Zone and on the high seas. It is in effect the coast guard of Malaysia. The agency is not part of nor are there any plans for it be integrated into the Malaysian Armed Forces. The Agency and its members are part of the Malaysian Civil Service and report directly to the Ministry of Home Affairs.

== Military police ==
The Malaysian Armed Forces (MAF) has three branches: the Malaysian Army, Royal Malaysian Navy, and Royal Malaysian Air Force. Each branch has its own military police unit, which is responsible for maintaining law and order and providing security within its respective service. This includes Kor Polis Tentera DiRaja, RMAF Provost Unit, and RMN Provost Unit.

== Ministries ==
=== Ministry of Human Resources ===
Ministry of Human Resources is responsible for enforcing various laws related to labor and employment. The ministry is tasked with ensuring that employers and employees comply with relevant laws, regulations, and policies related to employment practices, industrial relations, and social security.

Some of the laws and regulations enforced by the Ministry of Human Resources in Malaysia include the Employment Act, Industrial Relations Act, Trade Unions Act, Minimum Wages Order, and Occupational Safety and Health Act. The ministry also oversees the administration of several social security programs, such as the Employees Provident Fund (EPF) and Social Security Organization (SOCSO).

=== Ministry of Domestic Trade and Cost of Living ===
Ministry of Domestic Trade and Costs of Living has the authority to enforce laws related to trade and consumer protection. It is responsible for implementing and enforcing various laws and regulations related to trade practices, including the Price Control and Anti-Profiteering Act, the Trade Descriptions Act, and the Consumer Protection Act.

The Ministry also conducts regular inspections and audits to ensure compliance with these laws, and it has the power to take legal action against businesses that violate them. In addition, the Ministry collaborates with other government agencies, such as the police and the customs department, to combat illegal trade activities such as smuggling, counterfeit goods, and other forms of illicit trade.

=== Ministry of Agriculture and Food Security ===
The Ministry of Agriculture and Food Security (MAFS) is responsible for formulating and implementing policies related to agriculture, food, and agro-based industries.

The Ministry has several departments, including the Department of Fisheries and the Department of Veterinary Services, which are responsible for enforcing laws related to their respective areas. The Department of Fisheries, for instance, is responsible for managing the country's fisheries resources and enforcing laws related to fishing activities, while the Department of Veterinary Services is responsible for ensuring that livestock are healthy and that animal products are safe for consumption.

=== Ministry of Home Affairs ===
The Ministry of Homr Affairs (MOHA) enforces a wide range of laws and regulations related to immigration, passports, printing and publication, film censorship, terrorism, human trafficking, and other matters. It also provides a number of services, such as managing the prison system, providing disaster relief, and countering drug trafficking.

MOHA enforces the Printing Presses and Publication Act 1984, which controls the printing and publication of newspapers, books, and other materials. MOHA has the power to seize and detain publications that are considered to be in violation of the Printing Presses and Publication Act.

=== Ministry of Health ===
Ministry of Health (MOH) is responsible for enforcing laws related to public health and safety. The ministry works to ensure that healthcare services are accessible, affordable, and of high quality, and it has the authority to enforce laws and regulations related to healthcare practices and standards.

Some of the laws enforced by the Ministry of Health in Malaysia include the Private Healthcare Facilities and Services Act, the Poisons Act, the Food Act, and the Control of Tobacco Product Regulations. The ministry also oversees the regulation of pharmaceuticals, medical devices, and other healthcare products and services.

=== Ministry of Natural Resources and Environmental Sustainability ===
Ministry of Natural Resources and Environmental Sustainability is responsible for enforcing laws related to the environment and water resources. The ministry works to protect the environment and ensure the sustainable use of natural resources by enforcing laws related to pollution control, conservation, and waste management.

The ministry enforces various laws and regulations related to environmental protection, such as the Environmental Quality Act, the National Forestry Act, and the Wildlife Conservation Act. It also oversees the regulation of water resources, including the management of water supply and the protection of water quality.

=== Ministry of Transport ===
Ministry of Transport (MOT) is responsible for the enforcement of laws that govern transportation and logistics within the country. It oversees various sectors, including land, maritime, and aviation transport, ensuring that national regulations are adhered to and international standards are met. The ministry works through agencies such as the Road Transport Department (JPJ), the Marine Department, and the Civil Aviation Authority of Malaysia (CAAM), which regulate everything from road traffic safety and vehicle licensing to maritime operations and aviation safety. These agencies collaborate to enforce transport-related laws, promote safety, and ensure the smooth functioning of Malaysia's transportation systems.

Key laws enforced by the MOT include the Road Transport Act 1987, which governs road traffic rules, vehicle registration, and driver licensing; the Commercial Vehicles Licensing Board Act 1987, which regulates commercial transport services; and the Civil Aviation Act 1969, which oversees civil aviation safety and standards. Additionally, the ministry ensures compliance with international conventions such as those set by the International Maritime Organization (IMO) and the International Civil Aviation Organization (ICAO). Enforcement activities include inspections, audits, and penalties for violations, all aimed at maintaining safety and efficiency in the transportation sector.

== Agencies ==
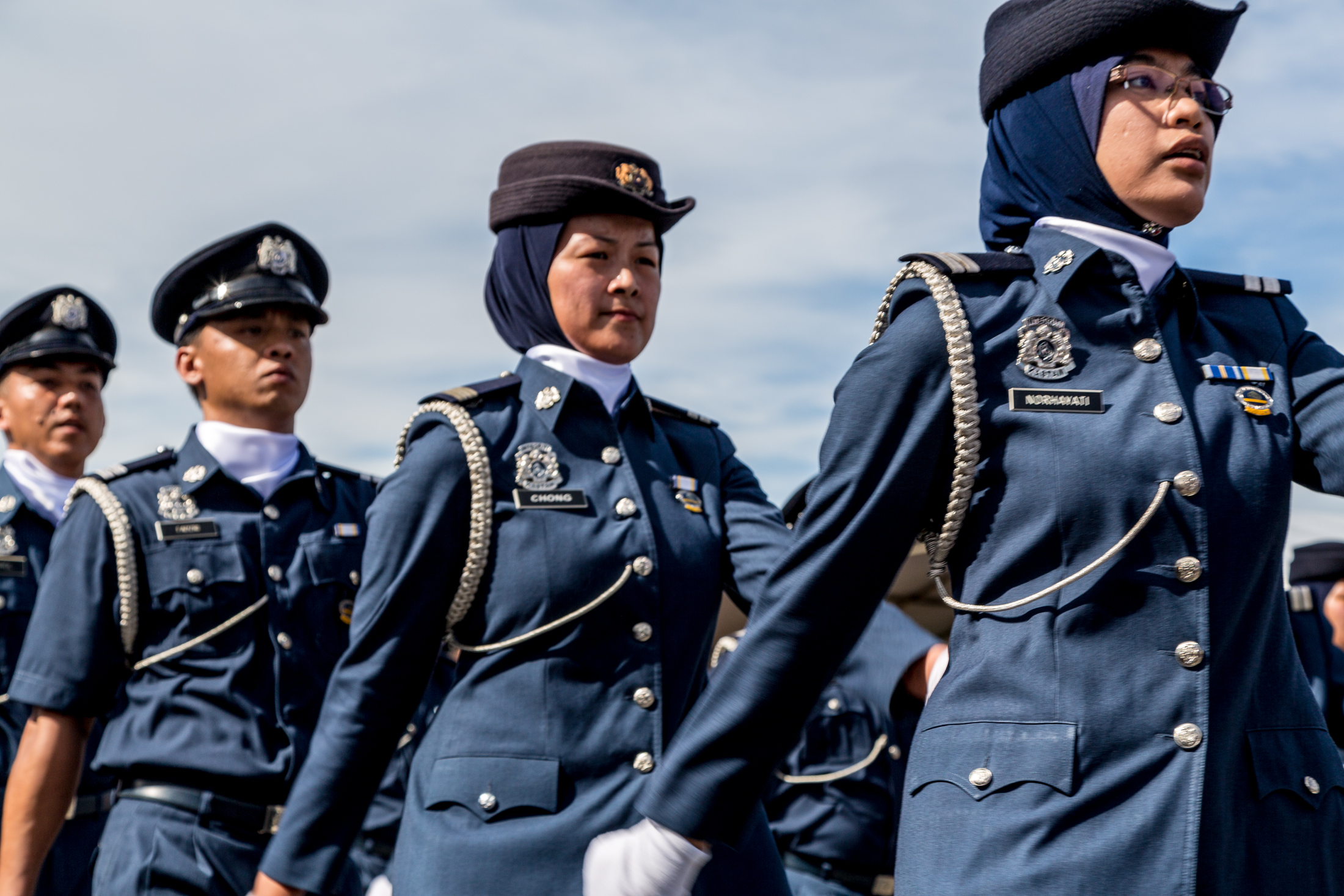
Officers of Royal Malaysian Customs

Besides the RMP and MMEA, other government agencies that also enforce specific laws are as follows:

=== Royal Malaysian Customs Department ===
The Royal Malaysian Customs Department is a government agency under the Ministry of Finance. The department is responsible for administrating the nation's indirect tax policy. The department also manage the country's customs, excise, and trade regulations. Its main role is to facilitate international trade while ensuring compliance with the country's laws and regulations.

The department is responsible for enforcing customs regulations, such as the collection of duties and taxes on imports and exports, the control of prohibited and restricted goods, and the prevention of smuggling and other illicit activities. The RMC administers seven main and thirty-nine subsidiary laws. Apart from this, the RMC implements eighteen laws for other government agencies.

=== Inland Revenue Board of Malaysia ===
The Inland Revenue Board of Malaysia, also known as Lembaga Hasil Dalam Negeri Malaysia (LHDN), is responsible for enforcing laws related to taxation in Malaysia. It is an agency under the Ministry of Finance and is responsible for collecting and administering various types of taxes, including income tax, goods and services tax (GST), and real property gains tax.

LHDN has a wide range of powers and functions related to taxation enforcement, including conducting audits and investigations to ensure compliance with tax laws, imposing penalties for non-compliance, and taking legal action against tax evaders.

=== Malaysian Anti-Corruption Commission ===
The Malaysian Anti-Corruption Commission (MACC) is a government agency in Malaysia that investigates and prosecutes corruption in the public and private sectors. The MACC was modelled after top anti-corruption agencies, such as the Hong Kong's Independent Commission Against Corruption and the New South Wales Independent Commission Against Corruption in Australia.

The MACC is recognized for its active role in investigating high-profile corruption cases and has contributed to enhancing Malaysia's standing in global corruption perception rankings. However, the agency has been criticized for its perceived lack of autonomy and potential political influence. Currently, the MACC operates under the Prime Minister's Department.

=== Malaysian Prison Department ===
The Malaysian Prison Department is a government agency responsible for the management and rehabilitation of prisoners in Malaysia. The department operates under the purview of the Ministry of Home Affairs.

The main goal of the Malaysian Prison Department is to ensure the safe and secure custody of prisoners while also providing them with opportunities for rehabilitation and reintegration into society. The department manages various types of correctional institutions throughout the country, including prisons, rehabilitation centers, and detention centers.

=== Malaysia Volunteers Corps Department ===
Malaysia Volunteers Corps Department, also known as RELA, is a paramilitary civil volunteer corps formed by the Malaysian government. Their main duty is to check the travelling documents and immigration permits of foreigners in Malaysian cities, including tourists, visitors and migrants to reduce the increasing rate of illegal immigrants in Malaysia. RELA has the authority to deal with situations like policemen, such as raiding suspected streets or places such as factories, restaurants and even hotels.

They are also fully authorised to conduct the interrogation and even detaining people who forget to bring their travelling documents, like passports and/or working permits. Besides that they are also tasked with security works at times. During times of war, they are absorbed into the Malaysian Army as support groups despite their law enforcing duties. They are also tasked to do SAR works if needed.

=== Immigration Department of Malaysia ===
The Immigration Department of Malaysia is a government agency responsible for enforcing immigration laws and regulations, as well as managing the movement of people in and out of Malaysia, including issuing visas, work permits, and other travel documents. The department is also responsible for conducting passport checks, preventing illegal immigration, and carrying out enforcement operations against undocumented immigrants. The agency plays a critical role in ensuring national security and maintaining the integrity of the country's borders.

=== Malaysian Road Transport Department ===
The Malaysian Road Transport Department is a government department under the Ministry of Transport. This department is responsible for the issuing of driving licenses and Malaysian number plates. According to the Road Transport Act 1987, the enforcement is charged with the responsibility of undertaking registration and licensing of drivers and all motor vehicles and trailers in Malaysia.

=== Civil Aviation Authority Malaysia ===
The Civil Aviation Authority of Malaysia (CAAM) is a regulatory body responsible for the safety and security of civil aviation in Malaysia. CAAM's primary function is to ensure that all civil aviation activities in Malaysia comply with international and national aviation safety standards.

=== Malaysia Marine Department ===
Malaysia Marine Department is a regulatory body responsible for the safety and security of shipping in Malaysia. JLM conducts safety audits of ships and ports, issues licenses and permits to shipping personnel and organizations, investigates accidents and incidents involving ships, develops and enforces maritime safety regulations, and promotes maritime safety awareness among the public.

=== Malaysian Communications and Multimedia Commission ===
Malaysian Communications and Multimedia Commission (MCMC) is an agency under the purview of the Ministry of Communications and Digital that is responsible for regulating the country's communications and multimedia industry and enforcing laws related to it. The MCMC has the authority to enforce laws related to content regulation, cybersecurity, and other areas under its purview. This includes the power to issue fines, notices, and summonses to individuals or companies that violate the laws and regulations related to the communications and multimedia industry.

=== National Anti-Drugs Agency ===
The National Anti-Drug Agency (NADA) of Malaysia is a government agency under the purview of the Ministry of Home Affairs. Its primary objective is to combat drug abuse and drug trafficking in Malaysia.

NADA is responsible for implementing and coordinating drug prevention, treatment, and rehabilitation programs throughout the country. It also carries out enforcement activities to suppress drug trafficking and abuse, including conducting investigations, seizures, and arrests.

=== Securities Commission Malaysia ===
Securities Commission Malaysia (SC) plays a central role in shaping Malaysia's capital market. It prioritizes fairness, order, and transparency by establishing and enforcing a comprehensive set of regulations. This legal framework includes the Capital Markets and Services Act 2007, Securities Commission Malaysia Act 1993, Securities Industry (Central Depositories) Act 1991, Securities Industry Act 1983, Futures Industry Act 1993 and other relevant acts. The SC actively monitors market activities and has the power to investigate and take action against participants who break these securities laws.

=== Central Bank of Malaysia ===
BNM safeguards the Malaysian financial system by enforcing various laws like the Financial Services Act, Islamic Financial Services Act, and Anti-Money Laundering rules. They achieve this through clear regulations, regular check-ups on financial institutions, and penalties for breaking the rules. This focus on healthy financial practices for banks, consumer protection, and preventing criminal activity helps maintain a stable and secure financial environment in Malaysia.

== See also ==
- Crime in Malaysia
- Laws of Malaysia
- Law enforcement in Singapore
