= Uniform beret =

Beret worn as part of a non-military uniform

This article describes the use of the beret as part of the uniform of various organizations. The use of the beret as military headgear is covered in a dedicated article, Military beret.

== Police and paramilitary organizations ==
=== Austria ===
Blue berets are currently in use with the Bundespolizei and have differing emblembs indicating their line of service.

=== Germany ===
During the Cold War, West German police and the BGS were required to wear green beret with the emblem of either their state or the BGS insignia. Today, dark berets are in use with riot police units of state police forces. The successor of the BGS, the Bundespolizei reserved green berets for members of its elite GSG9 while the beret for riot police was ditched in favor of base caps, but many officers wished for berets to be reintroduced. In spring 2020 reintroduction of dark blue berets for these units began.

=== Hong Kong ===
The navy blue beret is the standard headgear of officers of the Police Tactical Unit of the Hong Kong Police Force. Officers are nicknamed the "Blue Berets" or the "Blue Caps". These berets are also being worn by the officers of the Emergency Unit, Airport Security Unit and Counter Terrorism Response Unit of the Hong Kong Police Force.

Hong Kong Correctional Services also adopts berets as one of their main headgears.

Hong Kong Customs and Excuse's Dog and Small Boats units also wear a dark blue beret with embroidery cap badge.

=== Iceland ===
The members of the Special Operations Unit of the National Commissioner of Icelandic Police (Víkingasveitin) wear black berets. High-ranking members of the Reykjavík Air Rescue Unit are entitled to wear red berets after 5 T-10 army parachutes jumps (3 Hollywood jumps and 2 with full gear).

=== Indonesia ===
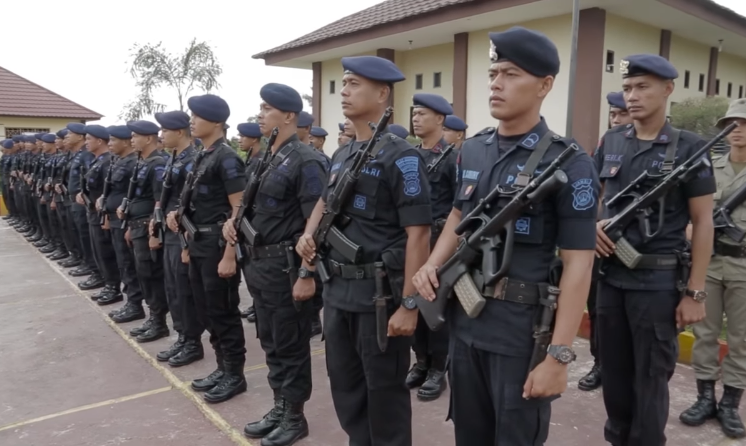
Brimob personnel wearing their dark blue berets

The Indonesian National Police wear and use Berets as their uniform headdress. The berets worn by law enforcement agencies are dragged to the left while in the other hand, the military wear berets dragged to the right. Different beret colours indicates the wearer's unit. Dark blue is worn by members of the Mobile Brigade Corps, Dark Brown is worn by members of the public police unit, Light blue is worn by internal affairs officers and members participating in UN operations, and Blue berets are worn by water police units.

=== Italy ===
Dark blue berets are worn by the Polizia di Stato and blue berets by the Polizia Penitenziaria.

=== Malaysia ===
Royal Malaysia Police
Colour	Wearer
Dark blue	General Task Police Force, General Operations Force (with Yellow badge lining and Khaki Hackle), Auxiliary Police, Police Volunteer Reserve Corps, Police Undergraduate Voluntary Corps, High School Royal Police Cadet Corps (with Light Blue badge lining and hackle)
Red	Federal Reserve Unit (Anti-riot Police) (with Red hackle)
Maroon	Senoi Praaq (with Yellow badge lining and Khaki hackle), Special Actions Unit (with Maroon hackle)
Tan	69 Commando
Light blue	Marine Operations Force, UNGERIN

- Hackle is worn above cap badge during official duty and ceremony parade. All police personnel usually wear dark blue hackle unless stated above. However, for the General Task Police Force and General Operations Force, the hackle's colour differs between Police Contingent and Brigades.

Malaysian Maritime Enforcement Agency (Coast Guard)
Colour	Wearer
Dark blue	Regular MMEA Force
Scarlet	Special Task and Rescue

Other Government Agency
Colour	Wearer
Blue Black	Royal Malaysian Customs, Road Transport Department, Anti-Corruption Commission, Immigration Department
Red	Fire and Rescue Department, Immigration Department's Special Control Team (Anti-riot)
Orange	Civil Defence Force
Yellow	RELA

=== Macau ===
The members of the Police Tactical Intervention Unit of the Public Security Police Force wear red berets with the force emblem on it as its standard headgear.

=== Pakistan ===
The Pakistan Levies wear the black beret as a force wide item.

=== Panama ===
The following branches of the Panamanian Public Forces wear berets:

- Panamanian National Police - dark blue (cadets)
- National Border Service - Green
- National Aeronaval Service - Green (Infantry Battalion), Tan (Special Forces)
- Institutional Protection Service - Black (duty uniform only)

=== Philippines ===
Black berets are worn by the Philippine National Police's Special Action Force and the Special Operations Group of the Philippine Coast Guard, while some other Non-commissioned PNP officers wear blue berets when in a specific event.

=== Poland ===
The Polish Police Anti-Terrorist Units wear dark blue berets. Dark blue berets are also worn by other Police special units such as pyrotechnics. Polish Border Guards wear light green berets.

=== Portugal ===
In Portugal, the beret is worn by a number of civil security forces and emergency organizations. The colors worn are:

Colour	Wearer
Green	Public Security Police (PSP) Special Operations Group (GOE)
Black	PSP Underground Security and Explosive Disposal Unit (CIEXSS) and Prison Guard
Red	PSP Dog Unit
Dark blue	PSP Riot Unit, Civil Protection, Firefighters and Maritime Police
Crimson	Portuguese Red Cross (CVP) Rescue Corps (until 2008)
Tan	CVP Rescue Corps (since 2008)
UN blue	PSP Bodyguard Unit, Personnel serving with the United Nations on international missions

=== Singapore ===
Black berets were worn by all members of the Singapore Police Force until 1969, when the peaked cap was introduced. The beret was, however, retained for specialist forces, such as officers of the Special Operations Command (SOC) and the Police Coast Guard, as well as the Gurkha Contingent. A dark blue beret is worn, although the Police Tactical Unit of the SOC switched to red berets in 2005. The Gurkha Contingent began wearing khaki-coloured berets from 2006. TransCom (Public Transport Security Command) officers wear light grey berets.

Members of the Singapore Civil Defence Force attached to a headquarters element, or on overseas missions, also wear black berets. These are adorned with the SCDF crest, and may sport a flash in certain specialist units, such as the Rescue Dog Unit and the elite Disaster Assistance and Rescue Team.

Auxiliary police officers of Certis CISCO and Aetos Security Management don dark blue berets when performing escort and other high-risk duties, as do specialist forces of the Singapore Prison Service. In addition, student cadets of uniformed youth organizations such as the National Cadet Corps also wear berets of different colours. National Cadet Corps has three distinct beret colours for each of its services (Land, Sea and Air), these are NCC Green, NCC Black and NCC Blue for each service respectively. The National Police Cadet Corps wears their own separate dark blue berets, while National Civil Defence Cadet Corps wears their separate black beret.

=== South Africa ===
The Special Task Force of the South African Police Service wear camouflage berets.

=== South Korea ===
Several police SWAT teams belonging to different municipalities wear either maroon or green berets; Seoul Metropolitan Police SWAT team (Unit 868) wears maroon berets, while Incheon Metropolitan Police SWAT team (Unit 313) wears green berets.

=== Spain ===
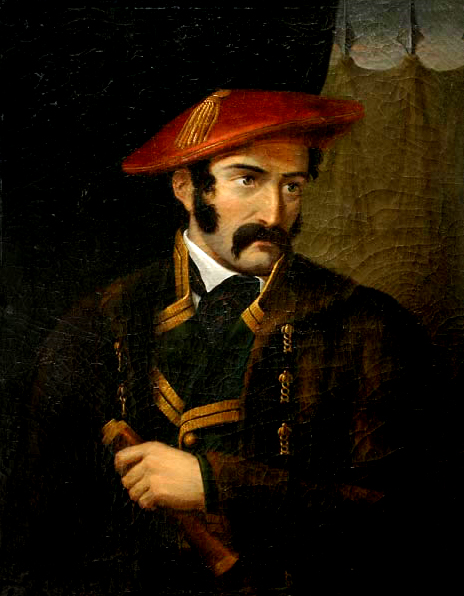
The Carlist general Tomás de Zumalakarregi in his red beret.

The beret, txapela in Basque, where it was especially popular, has been in common usage in Basque Country for centuries. Some believe it was introduced in the sixteenth century from the Low Countries, which at the time shared the same monarchy. The Txapelgorriak (from Basque txapel gorri, "red beret") were an Isabelline troop, but later the red beret became a symbol of Carlism. The red beret became a Falange symbol when Carlism was temporarily merged into it after the Spanish Civil War.

Today, red berets are worn on ceremonial occasions by various local and autonomous police forces in Spain, such as the Basque police force, Ertzaintza, in common with older police units such as the former Miquelete police of Gipuzkoa and "Foral" police of Bizkaia. The historic provincial police forces of Álava (Miñones) and Navarra (Policía Foral/Foruzaingoa) and a few local city police forces, including Bilbao, still wear the traditional red berets, though many police forces now wear a baseball-style cap for duty, retaining the beret for ceremonial duties. Catalonia's police Mossos d'Esquadra have traditionally worn long sloping barretina-style berets Barretina with red and black checkered bands, though caps are becoming more popular

=== Sri Lanka ===
The Special Task Force of the Sri Lanka Police wear green berets. Sri Lanka Army Commandos wear a maroon beret while special forces wear a black beret.

=== Turkey ===
Gendarmerie General Command personnel wears green beret. Police Special Action teams of General Directorate of Security wears dark green beret while Çevik Kuvvet personnel wear dark blue.

=== Ukraine ===
The maroon beret was used by Berkut officers as their standard headgear.

=== United Kingdom ===
CO19, the armed response unit of the London Metropolitan Police, used to wear dark blue berets, and were nicknamed the 'Blue Berets'. Today, they generally wear helmets or baseball caps.

Navy blue berets are part of the uniform of the Northern Ireland Security Guard Service.

The Combined Cadet Force wear berets appropriate to their regimental affiliation (Army Cadet Force) or the RAF beret with the ATC cap badge (except for the CCF(RAF) who wear the RAF cap badge).

== Civilian organizations ==
Berets are associated with a variety of other organizations:

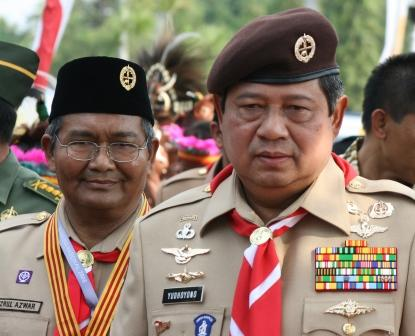
Susilo Bambang Yudhoyono, 6th President of Indonesia as Chief Scout, wearing dark brown beret as part of the scout uniform.

- The official Scouts Canada uniform included a beret between 1968 and 1998 (it was green until 1992, then navy blue). It has made a comeback with the older members in Rover Scouts having adopted the red beret as part of their uniform. The Boy Scouts of America are authorized to wear a red beret, although the BSA itself no longer makes them and very few Scout troops or Scouts wear them. The Girl Scouts of the USA have worn green berets that often led to members of rival military units reminding the United States Army Special Forces of the fact.
- In the United Kingdom, berets are worn by members of the Cadet Forces. These are in the appropriate service colour, with ACF and CCF Army Section units wearing the beret of the regiment or corps to which they are affiliated. Some cadet units who are affiliated to the Rifles regiment are permitted to wear the 'Back Badge'. The St John Ambulance Cadets of the UK can also wear black berets.
- Berets are worn by the Royal Canadian Army Cadets. They wear the same color as their affiliated regular force unit, unless there is no affiliated unit, in which case a green beret is worn.
- In Malaysia, cadets of the Kadet Remaja Sekolah Malaysia wear matching dark green berets.
- Navy blue berets have been the standard headdress of the Royal Canadian Legion as well as other veterans' groups in Canada. Members of the Canadian Merchant Navy Veterans Association wear a blue beret with a white crown.
- The Guardian Angels have adopted a red beret as a recognizable item of clothing
- Some security companies in Hong Kong such as Securicor wear berets.
- Members of the youth committee of the Mexican Red Cross used to wear a red beret, and black berets were worn by parachutists of the same institution. These were phased out in 2006, when a new uniform was issued.
- Sousaphone players in marching bands typically wear berets because the regular combination cap or shako would get in the way of the bell. All members of the Ohio State University Marching Band wear scarlet berets with a "Diamond Ohio" flash when not wearing their uniform hat (essentially, whenever they are outdoors and not performing).
- Members of the Civil Air Patrol who attend National Blue Beret (NBB) in Oshkosh, Wisconsin during the EAA AirVenture airshow can earn blue berets with the Saint Alban's Cross device, and the title of "Blue Beret."
- Firemen of Hong Kong Fire Services Department used to wear berets for non-emergency operations, but they have switched to baseball caps while ambulancemen are still wearing berets.
- Civil Aid Service and Auxiliary Medical Service also adopt black berets as part of their uniform.
- In Peru, the Music Band of San Ignacio de Recalde School was formed as a percussion band in 1994. Wind instruments were first acquired in 2004. The band wears green berets are part of their uniform.
- Members of the Assemblies of God boys program Royal Rangers typically wear a beret as a part of their class A and Class B dress uniforms, with specific color and symbols dependent upon the age group.
- Pathfinders (Seventh-day Adventist) wear a black beret with the badge in the middle; their leaders also use it, but with a different insignia
- Since August 2017, the Knights of Columbus Fourth Degree members are now wearing black berets as part of their new uniform.

== See also ==
- List of hat styles
