= Manohara Odelia Pinot =

Indonesian animal-welfare activist and former model

Manohara Odelia
- Born: Manohara Odelia Manz; 28 February 1992 (age 34); Jakarta, Indonesia
- Occupations: Model, actress, activist
- Political party: NasDem Party (2019)

Manohara Odelia Pinot (born Manohara Odelia Manz; 28 February 1992) is an Indonesian animal-welfare activist and former model and actress. She began modelling in her teens and was included in a selection of 100 Indonesian women published by the Indonesian edition of Harper's Bazaar. In August 2008, aged just 16, she took part in a marriage ceremony with Tengku Muhammad Fakhry Petra, a son of the Sultan of the Malaysian state of Kelantan.

After returning to Indonesia from Singapore in May 2009, she alleged that Fakhry had confined and abused her while she lived in Kelantan. Fakhry and the Kelantan royal family denied the allegations, and the case received extensive coverage in Indonesia and Malaysia. Fakhry won a defamation suit against Manohara and her mother by default, and the Kuala Lumpur High Court awarded him RM6 million in damages. In separate sharia proceedings, the Kelantan Sharia High Court treated the marriage as valid and continuing and ordered Manohara to return to Fakhry and repay money that the court found she had borrowed.

Manohara later worked in television before leaving the entertainment industry in 2014. She ran unsuccessfully for a seat in Indonesia's House of Representatives in the 2019 general election. By 2024, she was active in animal welfare and environmental protection. In 2026, she said that she had never entered a valid marriage with Fakhry and asked Indonesian media and several digital platforms not to refer to her as Fakhry's former wife.

== Early life and career ==
Manohara Odelia Manz was born on 28 February 1992 in Jakarta to George Manz, an American, and Daisy Fajarina, an Indonesian. At 17, she held United States and Indonesian passports. (Note: Indonesia permits limited dual nationality for qualifying children. Those born before the 2006 citizenship law took effect were subject to transitional registration procedures.) She later used Pinot, the surname of her stepfather, Juergen Reiner Noack-Pinot. She worked as a model in her teens and was included in the 100 Pesona Indonesia list published by the Indonesian edition of Harper's Bazaar, referred to by the Los Angeles Times as Indonesia's 100 Most Precious Women.

== Relationship with Tengku Muhammad Fakhry ==
=== Meeting and 2008 ceremony ===
Manohara met Tengku Muhammad Fakhry Petra, a son of Sultan Ismail Petra of Kelantan, at a party in Jakarta in 2006, when she was 14. Manohara and Fakhry continued to meet, usually with her mother, Daisy, present. Manohara said that Fakhry's mother informed her in August 2008 that a marriage ceremony would take place immediately and that a royal aide persuaded her to participate. The ceremony was held in Malaysia on 26 August 2008, when Manohara was 16. She later said that she had opposed the arrangement, remained silent during the ceremony and signed no marriage documents. Manohara returned to Jakarta soon afterward and resumed her modelling work.

=== Pilgrimage and loss of contact ===
In February 2009, Fakhry invited Manohara, her mother and her sister Dewi to perform the umrah pilgrimage in Saudi Arabia. Manohara and Daisy said that, as the group prepared to leave Jeddah on 9 March, Fakhry flew with Manohara on a private plane while Daisy and Dewi were left at the airport. Daisy said that when she travelled to Kuala Lumpur to see Manohara on 19 March, Malaysian immigration officials sent her back to Indonesia without giving a reason. She said that she last spoke to Manohara by phone on 21 March and was unable to contact her afterward.

=== Return from Singapore and abuse allegations ===
Manohara and members of the Kelantan royal family travelled to Singapore in late May 2009 while Sultan Ismail Petra received medical treatment there. Malaysian businessman Kadar Shah said that Manohara gave him a note asking for help and that he contacted Daisy afterwards. At the hotel where the royal party was staying, Manohara pressed the emergency alarm in a hotel lift. Security staff intervened, and she was reunited with her mother. A spokesperson for the United States Embassy in Singapore confirmed that embassy staff helped Manohara but gave no further details.

Manohara returned to Jakarta with her mother on 31 May 2009. She alleged that Fakhry had confined her and subjected her to physical and sexual abuse while she lived in Kelantan. Manohara later filed a police report in Indonesia about the alleged abuse. Fakhry denied the allegations and filed a police report in Malaysia against Manohara and Daisy, accusing them of making false statements. The Kelantan royal family also denied the accusations. The Kelantan palace later described the dispute as a personal matter between Manohara and Fakhry and said that it did not involve the Sultan.

== Legal proceedings ==
=== Civil defamation case ===
On 20 July 2009, Fakhry filed a defamation suit against Manohara and Daisy in the Kuala Lumpur High Court, seeking RM105 million over statements they had made at press conferences between April and June 2009. On 12 October, the High Court permitted the law firm representing Manohara and Daisy to withdraw from the case. On 29 October, the court gave them until 5 November to appoint new lawyers. After they failed to do so, the court entered judgment in default for Fakhry on 5 November.

Fakhry later testified at a hearing to determine damages, maintaining that the allegations were false and had damaged his reputation. On 11 March 2010, the High Court awarded him RM6 million in damages against Manohara and Daisy. The Times reported that Fakhry would need to begin legal proceedings in Indonesia to enforce the award there.

=== Sharia proceedings ===
Fakhry brought two claims in the Kelantan sharia courts, one seeking an order for Manohara to return to him as his wife, and the other seeking repayment of RM1,112,250 that he said she had borrowed. She was initially represented by her lawyers, Mohd Faiz Adnan and Roshdan Sujak Rafie. On 5 October 2009, the court granted her lawyers seven days to file a defence, which they had not yet submitted.

Through her legal team, Manohara had maintained that the disputed money was a gift rather than a loan. Both lawyers withdrew from the proceedings on 3 November. At a hearing on 15 November, Fakhry's cousin Tengku Azwani Tengku Iskandar, the only witness called, said that she had been close to the pair and had neither witnessed abuse nor received a complaint from Manohara. Manohara was neither present nor represented at the hearing.

On 13 December 2009, the Kelantan Sharia High Court treated the marriage as valid under Islamic law and ordered Manohara to return to Fakhry as his wife. The court also ruled that the disputed money constituted a debt that she was required to repay. The orders were to take effect after Fakhry completed a required istizhar (explicit promise) oath, after which she would have 14 days to return to him and 30 days to repay RM1,112,250. He took the oath on 3 January 2010. The judge said that if she did not return, she would be considered derhaka (disloyal) and nusyuz (recalcitrant) under the court's application of sharia law.

== Public and diplomatic response ==
During Malaysian prime minister Najib Razak's visit to Jakarta on 23 April 2009, reporters were not permitted to ask about Manohara at a joint press conference with Indonesian President Susilo Bambang Yudhoyono. Daisy held a separate press conference that day and appealed to Najib to investigate her daughter's situation and help restore contact between them. Indonesia's Foreign Ministry asked Malaysia to explain why Daisy had been denied entry and sought Malaysian assistance in arranging contact with Manohara. Indonesia's National Commission on Human Rights also said that it would contact its Malaysian counterpart about the allegations. After Manohara returned to Indonesia, Malaysian deputy prime minister Muhyiddin Yassin said that the Malaysian government regarded the dispute as a personal matter and did not intend to investigate it.

The case received sustained coverage in Indonesia and Malaysia and prompted street protests in Jakarta, including a demonstration outside the Malaysian embassy. Indonesian news coverage linked Manohara's case with the ongoing maritime dispute over Ambalat and other tensions with Malaysia. Political scientists Khadijah Md. Khalid and Shakila Yacob wrote that her allegations were received more sceptically in Malaysia, while her case received prominent and largely sympathetic coverage in Indonesia. Malaysian officials also regarded Indonesian coverage of the case as sensational and maintained that the dispute was a private matter between Manohara and Fakhry. Malaysian international-relations scholar Ruhanas Harun wrote that Indonesian media presented the case alongside other Indonesian grievances against Malaysia.

== Later life and activities ==
In July 2009, Manohara made her television acting debut in the soap opera Manohara. She said that she played a fictional character and did not portray herself. Ratings were strong initially, but declined later that year. By April 2010, she was receiving fees for speaking engagements and planning to launch a cosmetics line. She appeared in the film Aku Cinta Kamu in 2014 but later said that she left the entertainment industry that year. In a 2016 interview, she said that she was involved in a publishing magazines for businesses and institutions and in beauty-related ventures, and had no immediate plans to return to acting.

In 2018, Manohara began volunteering with the Jakarta Animal Aid Network. She said that her interest in animals began in childhood and had also led her to become vegan. That year, she joined the NasDem Party and said that she wanted to address the protection of women, children and wildlife through politics.

In the 2019 Indonesian general election, Manohara ran for the House of Representatives as a NasDem candidate in a constituency covering Surabaya and Sidoarjo, but was not elected. During her campaign, she spoke to residents in Surabaya about reducing plastic waste. In 2020, she spoke about her involvement in wildlife conservation work. In 2024, she was continuing to volunteer in animal welfare and environmental protection.

In January 2026, Manohara asked Indonesian media, Google and Wikipedia to stop referring to her as Fakhry's mantan istri, or ex-wife. She argued that the label gave the misleading impression that she had willingly entered the marriage. She maintained that she had been coerced as a minor, did not recognise the union as valid, and wanted to correct the public record.

== See also ==
- Child marriage
- Forced marriage
- Violence against women in Malaysia
