= At His Majesty's pleasure =

Legal term of art in the UK and the Commonwealth

At His Majesty's pleasure, or at Her Majesty's pleasure, depending on the gender of the monarch, sometimes abbreviated to the King's pleasure or Queen's pleasure, is a term of art in public law and in penal law. Both cases refer to indeterminate or undetermined lengths of time.

In public law, it refers to the length of service of certain appointed officials. This is based on the proposition that certain government officials are appointed by the Crown and can be removed for policy reasons, unlike employees. Originating in the United Kingdom, the phrase is now used throughout the Commonwealth realms, Lesotho, Eswatini, Brunei, and other monarchies, such as the Netherlands and Oman. In realms where the monarch is represented by a governor-general, governor, lieutenant governor, or administrator, the phrase may be modified to be at the governor's pleasure or variations thereof, since the governor-general, governor, lieutenant governor, or administrator is the monarch's personal representative in the country, state, or province; although their own tenure is at the monarch's pleasure.

In penal law, the term is applied to the indeterminate sentences of some prisoners and their detention in prison for an indefinite length of time.

== In public law ==
People appointed by the sovereign to serve the Crown and who have no set limit to the time they occupy their given office—for example, a governor-general and a minister of the Crown—are said to serve at His Majesty's pleasure. In Canada, the Canadian monarch's federal representative, the governor general, can appoint deputies who are described as holding office "during the Pleasure of the Governor General". Similarly, Australian federal ministers are appointed to serve "during the pleasure of the Governor-General".

== In penal law ==
The term is used to describe detention in prison for an indefinite length of time; a judge may rule that a person be "detained at His Majesty's pleasure" for serious offences or based on a successful insanity defence. This is sometimes used where there is a great risk of re-offending. However, it is most often used for juvenile offenders, usually as a substitute for life sentencing (which might be much longer for youthful offenders). For example, section 259 of the Sentencing Act 2020 (which applies to England and Wales) states, "where [...] a person convicted of murder, or any other offence the sentence for which is fixed by law as life imprisonment, and the person appears to the court to have been aged under 18 at the time the offence was committed. The court must sentence the offender to be detained during Her Majesty's pleasure."

Prisoners held at His Majesty's pleasure are periodically reviewed to determine whether their sentence can be deemed complete; although this power traditionally rested with the monarch, such reviews are now made in the name of the monarch, on the advice of government officials — the Secretary of State for Justice in England and Wales, for instance. Minimum terms are also set, before which the prisoner cannot be released; in England and Wales, these were originally set by the Home Secretary, but, since 30 November 2000, have been set by the trial judge. Prisoners' sentences are typically deemed to be complete when the reviewing body is "satisfied that there has been a significant change in the offender's attitude and behaviour".

== Derivatives ==
In Commonwealth republics, such as Botswana, India, Kenya, Pakistan, Singapore, South Africa, and Sri Lanka, the phrase is "during the president's pleasure". This term is also applied in other republics that are outside of the Commonwealth, such as Brazil, Croatia, Egypt, Finland, France, Iceland, Ireland, Italy, South Korea, Mexico, Montenegro, Portugal and Serbia.

In Hong Kong, following the transfer of its sovereignty to China in 1997, the term was modified to "at executive discretion" (Chinese: 等候行政長官的酌情決定). Subsequently, this was held, by Judge Michael Hartmann, in the case Yau Kwong Man v Secretary for Security [2002] 3 HKC 457 in 2002, to be incompatible with the separation of powers enshrined in Article 80 of the Basic Law, as the provisions of the Criminal Procedure Ordinance conferred an inherently judicial function upon the executive by empowering the Chief Executive to determine minimum terms of imprisonment for certain prisoners detained at executive discretion. The relevant provisions were subsequently amended in 2004 to vest this function in judges of the Court of First Instance.

In Malaysia, at the federal level, the term used is "at the pleasure of the Yang di-Pertuan Agong" and "at the pleasure of the sultan/ruler/governor", at the state level.

In the Philippines, Russia and Namibia, the equivalent standard for political appointments is called "at the pleasure of the president".

== See also ==
- Crime in Canada
- Crime in Malaysia
- HM Prisons
- The President's Pleasure (Singapore)
- Powers of appointment of the President of the United States
