= Operation Termite =

Part of the Malayan Emergency in 1954

- Part of Malayan Emergency
| Date | July–August 1954 |
| Location | Ipoh, Perak, Malaya (British Malaya) 4.576634291151735°N 101.25772594528215°E |
| Result | British-Commonwealth victory |

Belligerents
| (United Kingdom) British Empire; Australia | Malayan Communist Party |

Commanders and leaders
| Geoffrey Bourne, Director of Military Operations; Clifford Sanderson RAF, Director of Air Operations; Oliver Brooke; Noel Short; Hugh Moore RAAF; F.W. Lister RAF | Chin Peng, Chairman of the Malayan Communist Party |

Units involved
| 6th Gurkha Rifles; Malayan Scouts; Royal Scots Fusiliers; Sarawak Rangers; West Yorkshire Regiment; Singapore Royal Artillery; FMPF Police Field Force; FMPF Special Operations Volunteer Force; No. 1 Squadron RAF; No. 1 Squadron RAAF; No. 52 Squadron RAF; No. 267 Squadron RAF; No. 848 NAS | Malayan National Liberation Army |

Casualties and losses
| 6+ | 13 killed 181 camps destroyed |
- Location within Peninsular Malaysia

Operation Termite was a British-led joint military operation conducted from July to August 1954 during the Malayan Emergency. It took place simultaneously in the Kinta Valley and the Raia Valley, both located in Perak, roughly 17 kilometres (11 mi) east of Ipoh city. The operation aimed to eliminate communist strongholds established by the Malayan Communist Party (MCP) in these areas.

As the largest military operation of the Emergency, it involved extensive coordination between air and ground forces. Around 50 aircraft and five battalions of troops were mobilised to launch simultaneous attacks on communist camps in both valleys. While the number of enemy casualties was relatively low, the operation successfully destroyed many camps and logistical facilities, significantly disrupting the communist presence in the region.

== Geography ==
The Kinta Valley and Raia Valley (alternatively spelt as Raya Valley) are located within the Titiwangsa mountain range, about 14 kilometres (8.7 mi) from the Perak–Pahang border and roughly 25 kilometres (16 mi) from Cameron Highlands—an area known to be a stronghold of the MCP during World War II. (Note: The region was a known MPAJA stronghold during World War II, where SOE's Force 136 parachuted in several agents to train the MPAJA and conduct sabotage missions behind Japanese lines. British Army officer and jungle warfare instructor Freddie Chapman also operated in the area alongside the MPAJA after being stranded in Malaya for three years before successfully re-establishing contact with Force 136 agents on the ground.) Both valleys fall within what is today known as the Kinta Valley Geopark and are situated approximately 5 kilometres (3.1 mi) apart.

This region is characterised by dense rainforest-covered mountains, dominated by limestone formations and numerous natural limestone caves, which made it an ideal location for MCP guerrilla camps. The valleys also have abundant natural water sources, including streams and waterfalls, further supporting their use as remote hideouts.

During the Malayan Emergency, the area was extremely difficult to access—reachable only by foot or air. The current Federal Route 185, which passes through this region, was only completed in 2004, highlighting the isolation of the area at the time of the conflict.

== Background ==
=== Intelligence ===
The area where both valleys are located was a well-known "black area" during the Malayan Emergency—a term used for zones heavily influenced or controlled by communist forces. Since World War II, the region had served as a stronghold for the military wing of the MCP, formerly known as the Malayan People's Anti-Japanese Army, which carried out sabotage operations against the Japanese occupation forces.

However, the combination of dense rainforest, rugged terrain, and an extensive network of limestone caves made it extremely difficult for government forces to pinpoint the exact locations of communist camps. A breakthrough came when the Special Operations Volunteer Force (SOVF)—a paramilitary program run by the Special Branch of the Federation of Malaya Police Force (FMPF, present-day Royal Malaysia Police) and composed of defected MCP members—gathered crucial intelligence that revealed more accurate information about MCP activity in the area.

=== Strategy ===
The tactics for this operation were directly overseen by General Sir Geoffrey Bourne, who served as the Director of Military Operations (Malaya), and Air Marshal Sir Clifford Sanderson, the Commander of the Far East Air Force. General Bourne supervised the overall strategy, while Air Marshal Sanderson was in charge of the air operations. Together, they planned a large-scale joint air and ground offensive aimed at overwhelming the communist forces entrenched in both the Kinta and Raia Valleys.

The air component involved five squadrons tasked with various roles, including bombing runs, close air support, troop insertion, and medical evacuation. The squadrons involved were:

- No. 1 Squadron RAF – 6 Lincoln bombers
- No. 1 Squadron RAAF – 6 Lincoln bombers
- No. 52 Squadron RAF – Valetta transport aircraft
- No. 267 Squadron RAF – Valetta transport aircraft
- No. 848 Squadron NAS – 10 Whirlwind helicopters

On the ground, the main assault force comprised infantry units from five different formations, whose objective was to sweep through and secure the area. According to Karl Hack's 2021 book The Malayan Emergency: Revolution and Counterinsurgency at the End of Empire, approximately five battalions, or over 3,200 personnel, took part in the operation. The ground units included:

- 2nd Company, West Yorkshire Regiment
- 1st Battalion, 6th Gurkha Rifles
- 1st Battalion, Royal Scots Fusiliers
- Police Field Force, Federation of Malaya Police Force
- Special Operations Volunteer Force, Federation of Malaya Police Force

In addition to the infantry, the operation was supported by artillery units from the Singapore Royal Artillery, as well as special operations elements from the Malayan Scouts and the Sarawak Rangers.

=== The plan ===
The operation was executed in five meticulously coordinated phases, incorporating joint elements from air, infantry, and special operations forces under a unified command structure. The objective was to neutralise communist insurgent concentrations and restore government control over the designated area.

Pre-operational deployment

Preliminary movements commenced several days prior to the main assault. Infantry and artillery elements began an arduous advance on foot through dense, undulating rainforest terrain. Given the limitations imposed by the environment, early deployment was essential to ensure all ground elements reached their assigned start lines and were in position to support subsequent phases of the operation.

Phase One: Aerial bombardment

Phase One initiated with a series of concentrated bombing sorties conducted by Lincoln heavy bombers of RAF and RAAF. These strikes targeted known and suspected enemy encampments in open terrain, with the dual aim of degrading insurgent defensive capability and softening the area for airborne insertion.

Phase Two: Airborne insertion

Phase Two commenced in concert with the final wave of the bombing run. Valetta transport aircraft, operating from RAF Kuala Lumpur, inserted airborne elements from the Malayan Scouts. The insertion was conducted in close formation with the bomber stream to maintain surprise and cohesion. Paratroopers, deployed in strength and equipped for sustained engagement, were tasked with dislocating insurgent formations, suppressing movement between camps, and preventing enemy reorganisation ahead of the ground assault.

Phase Three: Helicopter deployment and communications establishment

Simultaneously, Whirlwind helicopters based at Ipoh Airfield (now Sultan Azlan Shah Airport) inserted special operations detachments from the Sarawak Rangers along with signal personnel and heavy communications equipment. These teams established secure forward communications nodes and effected link-up with advancing infantry and artillery columns, guiding them into operational positions.

Phase Four: Ground offensive

Upon successful consolidation of airborne and ground elements, Phase Four commenced with a deliberate, coordinated ground assault. Infantry units, operating in conjunction with the Malayan Scouts and Sarawak Rangers, conducted systematic clearance operations against identified enemy positions. During this phase, rotary-wing assets transitioned to roles including close air support and casualty evacuation, providing critical support to engaged ground forces.

Phase Five: Consolidation and area denial

Once the operational area had been stabilised and secured, and enemy forces either neutralised or expelled, the ground commander would report the outcome to the Director of Military Operations. Upon approval, the area would then be formally designated a 'white area' under the Emergency Regulations—a classification indicating that the zone was free of insurgent influence and had been returned to full government control.

== Battle ==
The raid commenced with Phase One, comprising a series of coordinated aerial bombardments conducted by 12 Lincoln bombers from No. 1 Squadron RAF and No. 1 Squadron RAAF, both operating out of Singapore. Over 75 tonnes of 1,000-pound ordnance were delivered across a 250 square miles (650 km^{2}) area, targeting known and suspected communist strongholds in an effort to degrade enemy positions and disrupt defensive cohesion ahead of ground operations.

Phase Two followed immediately upon completion of the final bombing run. A total of 200 special forces personnel from A and B Squadrons of the Malayan Scouts were inserted via parachute into both valleys. The insertion was executed from an altitude of 700 feet using Valetta aircraft from No. 52 Squadron RAF and No. 267 Squadron RAF, flying from RAF Kuala Lumpur. The airborne troops were tasked with securing key terrain and interdicting enemy movement prior to the main force's arrival.

Concurrently, Phase Three was initiated with the deployment of Sarawak Rangers accompanied by Royal Signals detachments and heavy communications apparatus. These elements were airlifted into the forward area by Westland Whirlwind helicopters of No. 848 Naval Air Squadron, launched from Ipoh Airfield. Upon insertion, the Sarawak Rangers split into two elements: one remained in situ to provide perimeter security and assist with the establishment of secure communications infrastructure, while the second advanced overland to establish contact with the main infantry and artillery elements that had been conducting a covert approach march over several days.

With all formations in position, Phase Four commenced—a deliberate, large-scale ground assault. The operation was conducted in concert by the Malayan Scouts, Sarawak Rangers, and regular infantry battalions. The force advanced methodically through the valleys, engaging and clearing multiple communist camps in a series of coordinated attacks designed to neutralise all hostile elements within the area of operations.

The operation concluded with Phase Five in August 1954, when the region was formally designated a "white area" under Emergency Regulations—a term denoting that the territory had been cleared of communist presence and returned to full governmental authority.

== Casualties ==
Casualties on the British-Commonwealth side were reported to be minimal. The only known injuries were six members of the 200-strong Malayan Scouts contingent, who sustained minor parachute-related injuries during their landing in the operational area.

On the MCP side, confirmed enemy casualties were also relatively low. Only 13 bodies of MCP guerrillas were recovered, making that the official count of enemies killed in the operation. However, British-Commonwealth ground forces discovered and cleared a total of 181 abandoned guerrilla camps, indicating a significant disruption to enemy infrastructure and presence in the area.

== Aftermath ==
Although the operation was deemed a success, the British Armed Forces in Malaya concluded that large-scale raids were not the most effective strategy. After Operation Termite, British military operations began relying more heavily on smaller and more agile units, typically at the platoon or section level. This approach proved far more effective in counterinsurgency efforts. It led to operations such as Operation Nassau, where precise raids and ambushes carried out by small units successfully eliminated key enemy leaders, disrupted command structures, and helped bring the Emergency closer to its conclusion.
