= Policewoman of Malaysia =

National policewoman force of Malaysia

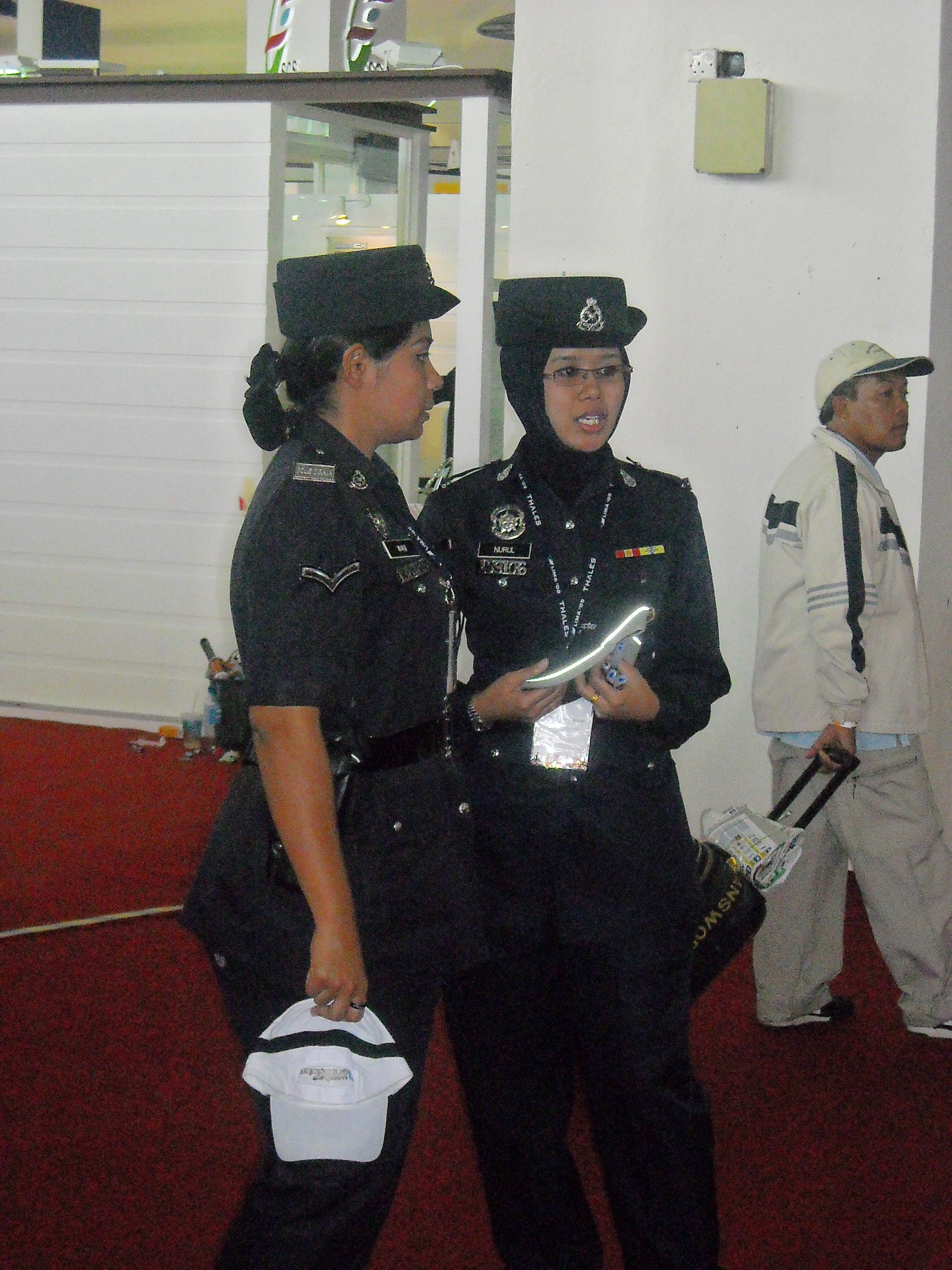
The policewomen in duties at Langkawi during LIMA 2009.

The Policewoman of the Royal Malaysia Police was first established during the Malayan emergency period, when local women were recruited as Special Police. In August 1955, the Policewoman Unit was officially organised.

== History ==
The involvement of women in policing institutions began on 23 June 1948. This restored the women involved in the movement of the Communist Party of Malaya (CPM) during the emergency in 1948. The early history of the establishment of women police from the emergency period in 1948 and the first intake of seven women's with the rank of Women Police Inspector in 1955. The first intake of 56 Women Police Constables (WPC) were ranked was in 1956. An Englishwoman police officer, Miss BDB Wentworth, was assigned to the Policewoman Unit to aid in efforts to recruit the Malayan pioneer group of policewomen. Intake the Women Special Constable or Special Constabulary (SC) have a very good response, especially among those who live in rural areas.

Members of the SC women assigned to the gates of entry and exit of new villages. They carried out their duties with the policemen and the male SC.

They tasks perform is as Inspecting Officer or Women Searcher against women and children. Prior to the establishment of SC women, these tasks formerly carried out by the police wives and civilians who are appointed as examiners for women.

After serving 52 years, the women police officers had proven their ability and excellence in various fields. The government at that time actively launched the operation to prevent food supplies from falling into the hands of communist terrorists. After the declaration of emergency was made, the government found that the most effective means to oppose communist terrorism was by checking those people receiving food supplies from public sources. This project required inspection/examination in villages, and because most of the people who worked as rubber tappers in Malaysia were women, they were ideal for the duties of checking food supply receivers.

Special Policewomen also worked in jails and as police escorts for women and children who were detained. Since then, the Policewoman Unit continues to develop, and further plays a vital role to maintain the peace and peoples' well-being in Malaysia.

== Notable policewomen members ==
- Commissioner of Police Dato' Robiah Binti Abdul Ghani
- Commissioner of Police Dato' Zaleha Binti Abdul Rahman
- Commissioner of Police Dato' Lee Bee Phang
- Commissioner of Police Normah Ishak
- Deputy Commissioner of Police Dato' Zakiah Laidin
- Deputy Commissioner of Police Dato' Yong Lei Choo
- Deputy Commissioner of Police Dato' Nooryah Binti Md Anvar
- Assistant Commissioner of Police Chandramalar Chelliah
- Superintendent Blossom Wong Kooi Fong
- Inspector Zaharah Binti Rautin
- Inspector Raja Nor Jasmi Binti Raja Shahar Shah
- Inspector Ng Leng Sim
- Inspector Emily Koshy
- Inspector Irene Lee Saw Leng
- Inspector Khairunisa Binti Karim
- Inspector Lee Yoke Lin

== See also ==
- Women in Malaysia
