= Crime in Malaysia =

- Homicide: 0.7 (2024)
- Assault: 10.5 (2023)
- Burglary: 103.4 (2006)
- Theft: 140.5 (2006)
- Corruption: 2.9 (2023)
- Bribery: 2.5 (2023)
- Rape: 4.8 (2023)
- Sexual violence: 10.4 (2023)
- reported per 100,000 inhabitants

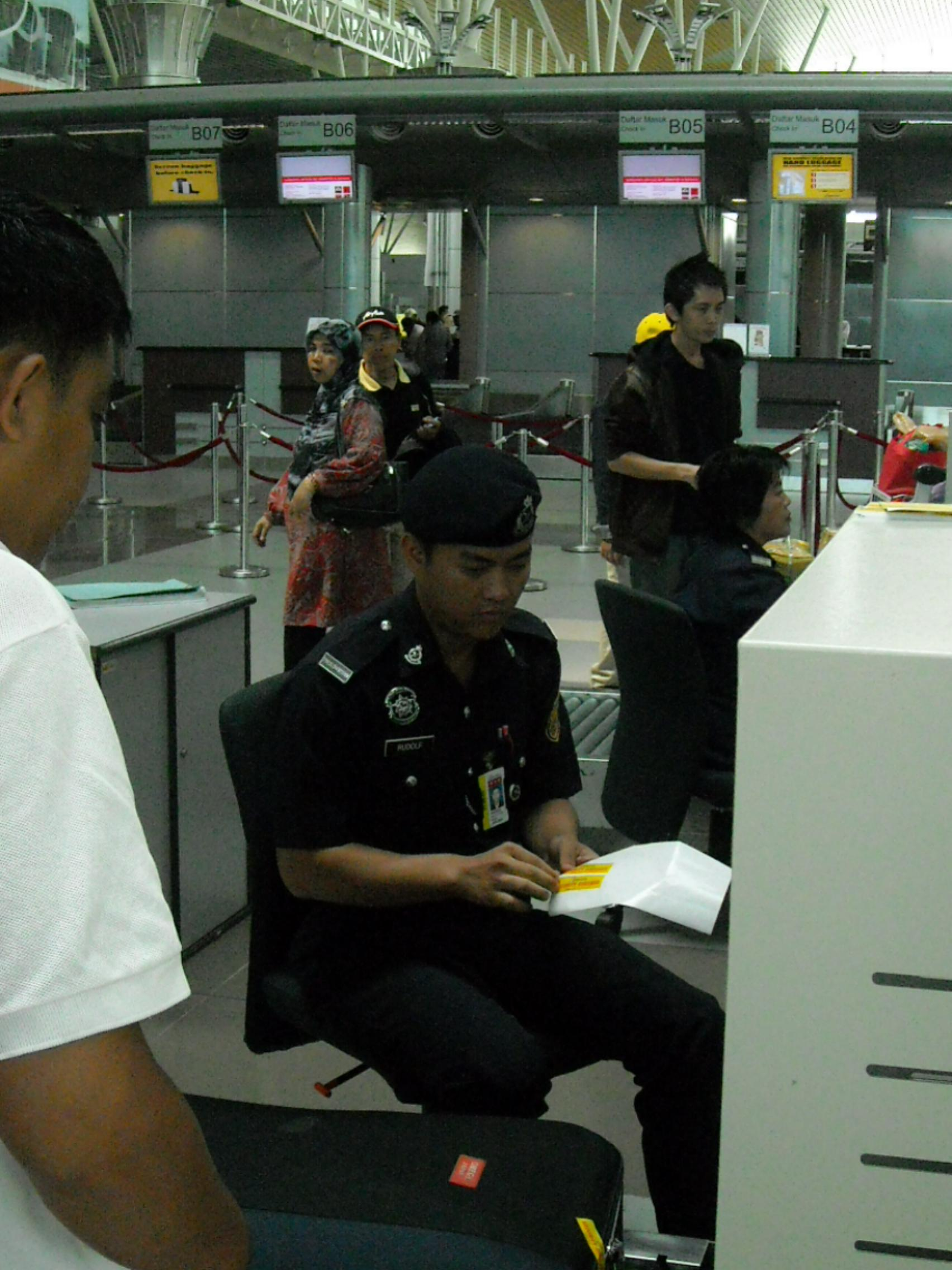
Royal Malaysia Police - Airport Police

Crime in Malaysia manifests in various forms, including murder, drive-by shooting, drug trafficking, money laundering, fraud, black marketeering, and many others. Sex trafficking in Malaysia is a significant problem.

The crime rate in Malaysia showed a decline of 11.9% in 2018 compared to the previous year. However, the public perception of crime did not improve.

According to the Royal Malaysia Police in 2014, the cities and towns with the highest number of criminal cases (in descending order) were Petaling Jaya, Johor Bahru, Bukit Mertajam, Ipoh and Kuantan.

== Human trafficking ==
Malaysia is a destination, supply and transit point for women and children trafficked for commercial sexual exploitation. Women and girls from Burma, Cambodia, China, Indonesia, the Philippines, Thailand, and Vietnam are trafficked to Malaysia. Malaysia is a transit country along with Indonesia, Philippines and Thailand in Chinese human trafficking. Women from Malaysia are trafficked into the People's Republic of China. Migrants from countries in the region work as domestic servants and laborers in the construction and agricultural sectors and face exploitative conditions.

Between 2005 and September 2009, more than 36,858 women were arrested for prostitution in Malaysia.

== Drug trafficking ==
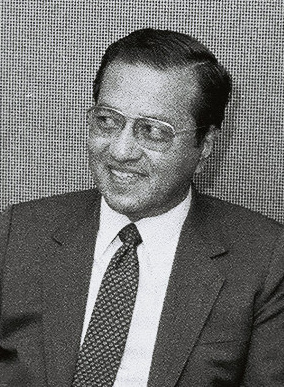
Under Mahathir Mohamad's leadership, Malaysia enforced strict anti-drug laws, including the mandatory death penalty for drug trafficking

Drug trafficking is a problem, heroin being the primarily used drug. The maximum penalty for drug trafficking is up to death, a measure which was introduced during the 1980s to combat drug offenses. Under Prime Minister Mahathir Mohamad’s administration, Malaysia intensified its anti-drug policies, launching the 1983 Anti-Drug Campaign and implementing strict enforcement measures, including mandatory death sentences and rehabilitation programs. The crackdown was further highlighted by the 1986 execution of Kevin John Barlow and Brian Geoffrey Chambers. In 1990, The Washington Post described Malaysia as "the worst place in the world to get caught with a pound of marijuana", highlighting its strict drug laws and mandatory death penalty for possession of large quantities.

== Crime against tourists ==
Violent crime against foreign tourists is less frequent in Malaysia; however, pickpocketing and burglaries are common criminal activities directed against foreigners. Other types of non-violent crime include credit card fraud and motor vehicle theft; there is a high rate of credit card fraud. Scams are a problem in Kuala Lumpur which involve card games and purchase of gold jewellery.

However, in the early 2010s, Malaysian society was rocked by several high-profile murders of tourists. In May 2011, a French tourist Stephanie Foray was murdered by a Malaysian shopkeeper in Tioman Island, and the perpetrator Asni Omar was convicted of her murder and sentenced to death in July 2014, but it was commuted to 36 years in prison in 2024. In August 2014, a fishmonger Zulkipli Abdullah brutally attacked and murdered two British medical students on a work placement in Kuching, Sarawak. Zulkipli was found guilty and sentenced to death in March 2015 for the double murder.

== Corruption ==
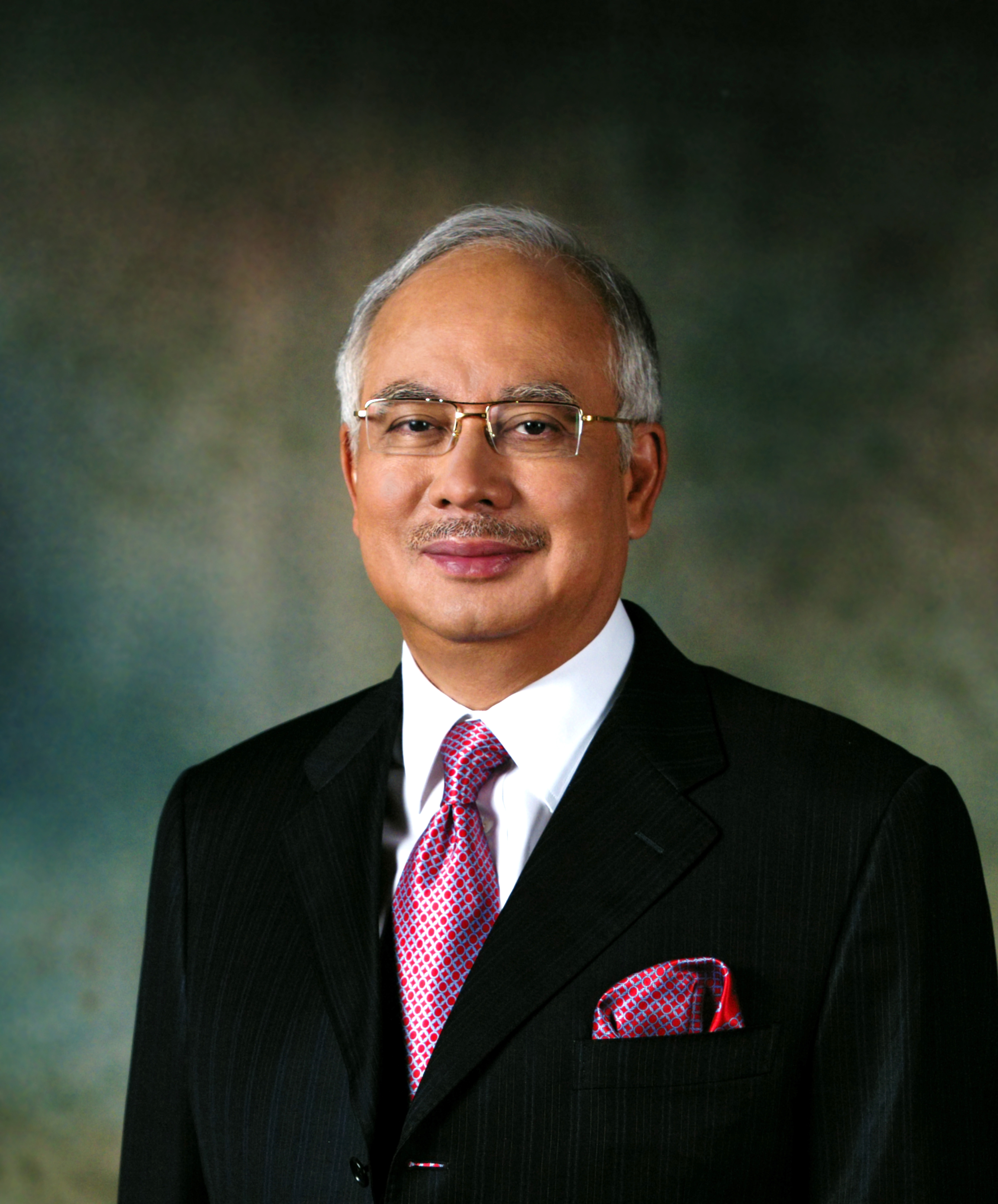
Najib Razak, who served as prime minister from 2009 to 2018, was the first in the nation’s history to be convicted and jailed for corruption, mainly due to the 1MDB scandal

In the 2021 Corruption Perceptions Index by Transparency International, Malaysia had a corruption score of 48 out of 100; Malaysia was ranked 62nd worldwide, similar to Jordan and Cuba, and 3rd in Southeast Asia, behind Singapore (1st in SE Asia, 4th worldwide) and Brunei (2nd in SE Asia, 35th worldwide), and ahead of Vietnam (4th in SE Asia, 87th worldwide), Indonesia (4th in SE Asia, 96th worldwide), Thailand (5th in SE Asia, 110th worldwide) and lastly the Philippines (6th in SE Asia, 117th worldwide).

Transparency International list Malaysia's key corruption challenges as:

1. Political and Campaign Financing: Donations from both corporations and individuals to political parties and candidates are not limited in Malaysia. Political parties are also not legally required to report on what funds are spent during election campaigns. Due in part to this political landscape, Malaysia's ruling party for over 55 years has funds highly disproportionate to other parties. This unfairly impacts campaigns in federal and state elections and can disrupt the overall functioning of a democratic political system.
2. “Revolving door”: Individuals regularly switch back and forth between working for both the private and public sectors in Malaysia. Such circumstances – known as the ‘revolving door’ – allow for active government participation in the economy and public-private relations to become elusive. The risk of corruption is high and regulating public-private interactions becomes difficult, also allowing for corruption to take place with impunity. Another factor which highlights the extent of ambiguity between the public sector and private corporate ownership is that Malaysia is also a rare example of a country where political parties are not restricted in possessing corporate enterprises.
3. Access to information: As of April 2013, no federal Freedom of Information Act exists in Malaysia. Although, Selangor and Penang are the only Malaysian states out of thirteen to pass freedom of information legislation, the legislation still suffers from limitations. Should a federal freedom of information act be drafted it would conflict with the Official Secrets Act 1972 – in which any document can be officially classified as secret, making it exempt from public access and free from judicial review. Additional laws such as the Printing Presses and Publications Act 1984, the Sedition Act 1948, and the Internal Security Act 1960 also ban the dissemination of official information and offenders can face fines or imprisonment. Malaysia suffers from corporate fraud in the form of intellectual property theft. Counterfeit production of several goods including IT products, automobile parts, etc., are prevalent.

On 3 July 2018, former Prime Minister Najib Razak was arrested by the Malaysian Anti-Corruption Commission (MACC), investigating how allegedly RM42 million (US$10.6 million) went from SRC International into Najib's bank account. Police seized 1,400 necklaces, 567 handbags, 423 watches, 2,200 rings, 1,600 brooches and 14 tiaras worth $273 million. On 28 July 2020, the High Court convicted Najib on all seven counts of abuse of power, money laundering and criminal breach of trust, becoming the first Prime Minister of Malaysia to be convicted of corruption, and was sentenced to 12 years' imprisonment and fined RM210 million.

== See also ==
- Law enforcement in Malaysia
- Violence against women in Malaysia
- 1Malaysia Development Berhad scandal
- List of alleged and confirmed crimes committed by members of the Johor royal family
