= Violence against women in Malaysia =

Public health issue of violent acts against women

Violence against women includes physical, psychological, emotional, and sexual abuse of women, predominantly by men. The most common form of violence is domestic violence. Malaysia rated 0.681 under the Global Gender Gap Report 2022 and ranked 103rd out of 146 countries.

== Types ==
=== Domestic violence ===
Domestic violence, also known as Intimate Partner Violence (IPV), is any behavior by a current or former partner or spouse that causes physical, sexual, or psychological harm.

A study conducted by Universiti Sains Malaysia in 2014 shows that 9% of ever-partnered women in Peninsular Malaysia have experienced domestic violence at some point in their lifetime.

Women's Aid Organisation (WAO) statistics on violence against women show that domestic violence increased from 2000 to 2018. In 2000, there were 3468 cases of domestic violence. In 2018, the number increased to 5513. This is corroborated by Police DiRaja Malaysia (PDRM) data that showed an increase in cases in the state of Selangor from 2017 to 2021.The COVID-19 pandemic brought to light the reality of the situation of violence against women in the country, WAO reported a fourfold increase in calls to the hotline. According to police statistics, around 19 268 cases were reported between 2020 and 2022. In 2022, Women's Aid Organization (WAO) executive director Sumitra Visvanathan suggested that Malaysia principle should be strengthened in this area and perceived it as a serious crime in order to reduce unwanted fatalities.

=== Female genital mutilation ===
Anecdotal reports indicates that almost all Malay Muslim women have undergone female genital cutting (FGC), largely because they think it is required by Islam and often these procedures are conducted by traditional midwives who are trained in the type IV FGC .

In 2009, the Fatwa Committee of the National Council of Islamic Religious Affairs declared FGM to be compulsory (wajib) for all Muslim women. FGM is a practice that has been the subject of a vigorous policy of zero tolerance from the World Health Organization (WHO).

Adoption of such legislation are perceived as “a step backwards” in the fight for women's rights. Historically, the practice of FGM was linked to the coming of Islam and FGM procedures deeply connected to Islam, Islamic notions of body purity in Malaysia and Malay ethnicity.

In Malaysia, few people have any specific information and expressed little concern with regard to the practice of FGM. A study conducted in 2012, by Dr. Maznah Dahlui, an associate professor at the University of Malaya's Department of Social and Preventive Medicine, found that 93 percent of Muslim women surveyed had been circumcised.

Another survey by Salleha Khalid et al. in 2016 of 402 Malay-Muslim women revealed that only a mere 4% – 16 out of 402 women – had not been “circumcised”. In recent years, organizations such as the UN have been calling for abolition of FGM practices in Malaysia. One of it was from the Convention on the Elimination of All Forms of Discrimination against Women (CEDAW) Committee that called for Malaysia to end FGM practices.

However, some still defended the practice claiming it would be culturally insensitive to abolish FGM completely in Malaysia and that “FGM practiced by the Malay community in north Malaysia is not the same as the FGM performed elsewhere”.

=== Rape ===
From 2000 to 2007, there was an increase of rape cases in all 15 states of Malaysia, from 1217 to 3098 cases. Among all 15 states in Malaysia, Johor had the highest rape cases as of May 2017. Based on the statistics released by the Penang Women Centre for Change, one woman is being raped every 35 minutes in Malaysia. In Malaysia, Section 376 of the Penal Code states that whoever commits rape shall be punished with imprisonment for a term which may extend to twenty years, and shall be liable to whipping.

==== Marital rape ====
Marital Rape is not legally recognized in Malaysia . But the new Section 375A states that any husband causing fear of death or hurt to his wife in order to have sex shall be punished for term which may extend to five years.

Since marital rape is not recognized as a crime in Malaysia, it is difficult for women to get access to justice. In a WAO report titled “Perspectives on Domestic Violence” released on International Women's Day in 2015 , the NGO said that rape was a crime even if it occurred in a marriage. The report noted that the United Nations Committee on the Convention on the Elimination of All Forms of Discrimination against Women, since 2006, had been asking the Malaysian government to criminalise marital rape.

=== Online gender-based violence ===
Online gender-based violence (OGBV), otherwise known as technology-facilitated gender-based violence is any act of violence that is either done or amplified through the use of digital technologies or tools that cause physical, sexual, social, psychological, political, or economic harm to women and girls on the basis of their gender.

== Legislation ==
Women in Malaysia have certain protection against domestic violence such as the Domestic Violent Act 1994 and Article 375 of the Penal Code (prohibition of rape).

=== Domestic Violence Act ===
The Domestic Violence Act in Malaysia was passed in 1995. The law took over 10 years to be passed because when women's NGO pushed for the enactment, they were met with resistance from patriarchal forces of the state. The Domestic Violence Act provides extensive provisions relating to protective orders (POs) which can be issued by the courts.

These include provisions on: a) Issuance of interim POs pending investigation of any alleged domestic violence offence prohibiting the person against whom the order is made from using domestic violence against the spouse, a child, an incapacitated adult or any other member of the family; b) Issuance of POs prohibiting the person against whom the order is made from using domestic violence against the spouse, a child, an incapacitated adult or any other member of the family during the course of any proceedings before the court involving a complaint of domestic violence; and c) Attaching of additional orders to the protection order.

=== Article 375 of the Penal Code ===
According to the Malaysian law and statutory, the minimum age of consent to participation in sexual activity is 16 years old. The Malaysia statutory rape law is violated when an individual has consensual sexual contact with a person under age 16.

Section 375 of the Penal Code (Malaysia), which covers rape states that (a) against her will; (b) without her consent; (c) with her consent, when her consent has been obtained by putting her in fear of death or hurt to herself or any other person, or obtained under a misconception of fact and the man knows or has reason to believe that the consent was given in consequence of such misconception; (d) with her consent, when the man knows that he is not her husband, and her consent is given because she believes that he is another man to whom she is or believes herself to be lawfully married or to whom she would consent; (e) with her consent, when, at the time of giving such consent, she is unable to understand the nature and consequences of that to which she gives consent; (f) with her consent, when the consent is obtained by using his position of authority over her or because of professional relationship or other relationship of trust in relation to her; (g) with or without her consent, when she is under sixteen years of age.

Explanation - Penetration is sufficient to constitute the sexual intercourse necessary to the offence of rape.

Exception - Sexual intercourse by a man with his own wife by a marriage which is valid under any written law for the time being in force, or is recognized in Malaysia as valid, is not rape.

Explanation 1 - A woman - (a) living separately from her husband under a decree of judicial separation or a decree nisi not made absolute; or (b) who has obtained an injunction restraining her husband from having sexual intercourse with her, shall be deemed not to be his wife for the purposes of this section.

Explanation 2—A Muslim woman living separately from her husband during the period of ‘iddah, which shall be calculated in accordance with Hukum Syara’, shall be deemed not to be his wife for the purposes of this section.

== Incidents of violence against women ==
On 3 September 2018, two women found guilty of attempting to have sex were caned in Terengganu, a conservative northeastern state in Malaysia, ruled by the Islamist opposition party Pan-Malaysian Islamist Party (PAS). It received criticisms from various rights groups such as Justice for Sisters and the Women's Aid Organization in Malaysia. It had also received criticisms from Human Rights Watch and Amnesty International, arguing that it was a violation of human rights. Malaysian officials justified the sentence by claiming it was “not painful” and had been intended to “educate” the women.

== Consequences ==
A recent study identified the pattern of help-seeking by women who have experienced intimate partner violence and their level of satisfaction with the help they receive. It showed that women who experienced IPV suffered various physical and mental health consequences. 81.8% of women who participated in this study reported being physically injured, while more than half reported high emotional distress. The majority of women seek help through friends and family. There were also 13.1% that did not tell anyone about the violence they experienced. This shows that not all survivors report their abuse.

== Access to justice for female victims of violence (Organisations) ==
There are over 10,000 NGOs in Malaysia. However, only women's NGOs would voice their concern about women and gender issues. Some women NGOs includes Women's Aid Organisation, All Women's Action Society and Sisters in Islam.

=== Women's Aid Organisation (Pertubuhan Pertolongan Wanita) ===
One objective of the Women's Aid Organisation (WAO) is to provide on request to women and their children suffering from mental, physical and sexual abuse, temporary refuge services that empower and enable them to determine their own future. Recently, WOA launched ‘Think I Need Aid’ for women survivors to report domestic violence through WhatsApp. This campaign had increased the number of reports from 699 in 2016 to 1698 in 2017. This increase in number was due to survivors being more comfortable reaching out through WhatsApp.

=== All Women's Action Society (AWAM) ===
AWAM is a non-profit, independent feminist organisation in Malaysia committed to ending gender-based violence and upholding equality and rights for all. It was established in 1998. some recent events that AWAM had organized in 2018 focusing on violence against women were:

- 4 June 2018: Workshop on Violence Against Women (VAW) and Child Sexual Abuse (CSA) for UTAR 4th Year Medical Students
- 28 April 2018: Unity and Equality Workshop
- 7 April 2018: Break the Silence: A workshop on Violence Against Women/Girls and Speaking U

=== Sisters In Islam ===
Sisters In Islam (SIS), formed in 1987, was initially a research, policy, and advocacy organisation based in Kuala Lumpur. Since then, SIS has become a strong force in advocating Muslim women's right in the presence of Islamic revivalism and Islamisation government policies. SIS strives to strike a balance between secular modernity and Islam. SIS had also confronted a variety of major issues including violence against women, women's equality and Islam, Islamic criminal law, and rape. In 1991, SIS had promoted two booklets entitled Are Women and Men Equal Before Allah and Are Muslim Men allowed to Beat Their Wives?, both of which were products of extensive, independent research and interpretation of the Qur’an. These booklets have provided Qur’anic interpretations on the issue of domestic violence. In addition, SIS was one of the women's NGOs that worked to get the Domestic Violence Act to pass.

== Activism against violence ==
=== Community Walk the Talk to Stop Violence Against Women by WOA ===
This program includes talks and workshops about how women and girls can try to protect themselves and avoid becoming victims of physical violence and cyber crimes, such as Master Saiful Hamiruzzam and team spoke and demonstrated about “How to Be Your Own Bodyguard”, and Cathryn Anila spoke on “How to Surf Online Safely (SOS)”

One workshop was also organised by NCWO targeted for the children aged 9 to 18 years on the subject, “The Malaysia We Want for our Family and Country”.

=== One Stop Crisis Centre (OSCC) ===
OSCC, available in all government hospitals in Malaysia, aims to support survivors of physical and sexual abuse. They collaborate with the police, NGOs, and the Social Welfare Department during crises. Services for survivors include medical care, legal protection, temporary shelter, legal aid, and counseling.

== See also ==
- Women in Malaysia
- Feminism in Malaysia
