= Road Transport Act 1987 =

Parliament of Malaysia
- Long title: An Act to make provision for the regulation of motor vehicles and of traffic on roads and other matters with respect to roads and vehicles thereon; to make provision for the protection of third parties against risks arising out of the use of motor vehicles; to make provision for the co-ordination and control of means of and facilities for transport; to make provision for the co-ordination and control of means of and facilities for construction and adaptation of motor vehicles; and to make provision for connected purposes.
- Citation: Act 333
- Territorial extent: Throughout Malaysia
- Passed by: Dewan Rakyat
- Passed: 10 July 1987
- Passed by: Dewan Negara
- Passed: 17 July 1987
- Royal assent: 30 August 1987
- Commenced: 24 September 1987
- Effective: [1 January 1988; P.U. (B) 694/1987]

Legislative history

First chamber: Dewan Rakyat
- Bill title: Road Transport Bill 1987
- Bill citation: D.R. 12/1987
- Introduced by: Zaleha Ismail, Deputy Minister of Transport
- First reading: 29 June 1987
- Second reading: 10 July 1987
- Third reading: 10 July 1987

Second chamber: Dewan Negara
- Bill title: Road Transport Bill 1987
- Bill citation: D.R. 12/1987
- Member(s) in charge: Zaleha Ismail, Deputy Minister of Transport
- First reading: 13 July 1987
- Second reading: 16 July 1987
- Third reading: 17 July 1987

Amended by
- Road Transport (Amendment) Act 1988 [Act A709] Road Transport (Amendment) Act 1994 [Act A878] Road Transport (Amendment) Act 1994 [Act A891] Road Transport (Amendment) Act 1996 [Act A973] Road Transport (Amendment) Act 1999 [Act A1065] Road Transport (Amendment) Act 2001 [Act A1101] Road Transport (Amendment) Act 2006 [Act A1262] Road Transport (Amendment) Act 2009 [Act A1356] Road Transport (Amendment) Act 2011 [Act A1391] Road Transport (Amendment) Act 2012 [Act A1440] Road Transport (Amendment) Act 2020 [Act A1618]

Related legislation
- Road Traffic Ordinance 1958 [Ord. No. 49 of 1958] Modification of Laws (Road Traffic Ordinance) (Extension and Modification) Order 1984 [P.U. (A) 136/1984]

Keywords
- Road transport
- Status: In force

The Road Transport Act 1987 (Malay: Akta Pengangkutan Jalan 1987) is an Act of the Parliament of Malaysia. It was enacted to make provision for the regulation of motor vehicles and of traffic on roads and other matters with respect to roads and vehicles thereon; to make provision for the protection of third parties against risks arising out of the use of motor vehicles; to make provision for the co-ordination and control of means of and facilities for transport; to make provision for the co-ordination and control of means of and facilities for construction and adaptation of motor vehicles; and to make provision for connected purposes.

== Structure ==
The Road Transport Act 1987, in its current form (1 February 2013), consists of 5 Parts containing 129 sections and 3 schedules (including 10 amendments).

- Part I: Preliminary
- Part II: Classification, Registration and Licensing Motor Vehicles and Drivers
  - Classification of Motor Vehicles
  - Registration of Motor Vehicles
  - Licensing of Motor Vehicles
  - Miscellaneous
  - Licensing of Motor Drivers
  - Driving and Offences in Connection Therewith
  - Licensing of Drivers and Conductors of Public Service Vehicles, Employees Vehicles and Goods Vehicles
  - Miscellaneous
- Part IIA: Periodic Inspection of Motor Vehicles
- Part IIB: Foreign Motor Vehicles
- Part III: Roads
- Part IV: Provisions against Third Party Risks Arising out of the Use of Motor Vehicles
- Part V: Offences and Miscellaneous Provisions
- Schedules
