= Women in Malaysia =

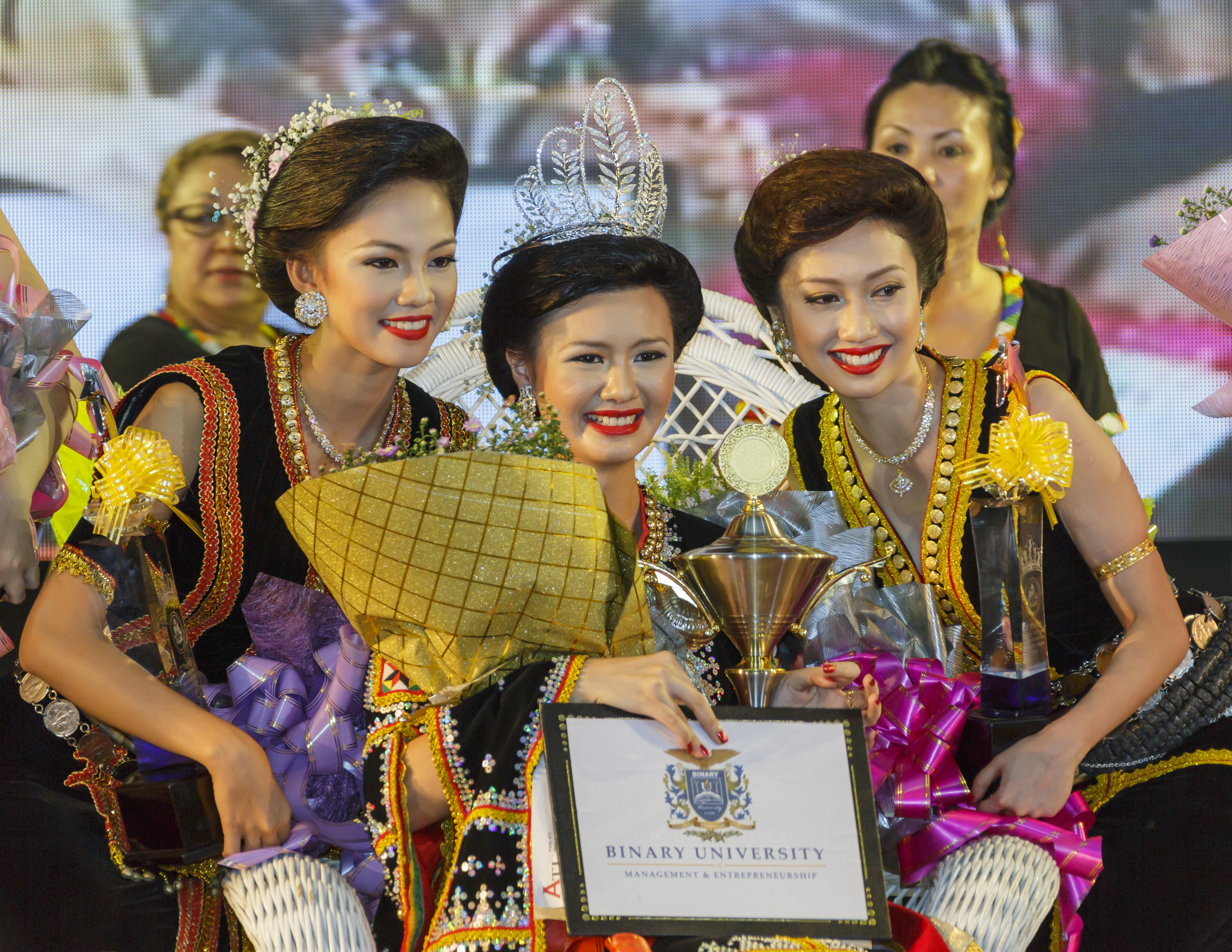

General statistics
- Maternal mortality (per 100,000): 29 (2010)
- Women in parliament: 13.2% (2012)
- Women over 25 with secondary education: 66.0% (2010)
- Women in labour force: 43.8% (2011)

Gender Inequality Index
- Value: 0.253 (2019)
- Rank: 59th out of 162

Global Gender Gap Index
- Value: 0.681 (2022)
- Rank: 103rd out of 146

Women in Malaysia receive support from the Malaysian government concerning their rights to advance, to make decisions, to health, education and social welfare, and to the removal of legal obstacles. The Malaysian government has ensured these factors through the establishment of Ministry of National Unity and Social Development in 1997 (formerly known in 1993 as Women's Affairs Secretariat or HAWA). This was followed by the formation of the Women's Affairs Ministry in 2001 to recognise the roles and contributions of Malaysian women.

47% of Malaysian women are in the workforce.

== Women's rights ==
Malaysia ratified the Convention on the Elimination of All Forms of Discrimination Against Women (CEDAW) in August 1995 with reservations. Certain reservations were removed in 2010 but some were maintained, namely Articles 9(2), 16(1)(a), 16(1)(c), 16(1)(f) and 16(1)(g) as these Articles were said to be in conflict with the Malaysian Federal Constitution and Islamic Law (Shari'a). The status of women in the country is complex, and partly dependent on their religion and on where they reside in the states and federal territories of Malaysia, factors which affect certain legal issues. The issue of women's rights in the country is subject to ideological disagreements between conservative and liberal interpretations of Islam, and between more secular forces. A recent Ph.D. doctoral dissertation from the University of Liverpool by Dr. Saleena B. Saleem studied this issue for Muslim women in Malaysia, mapped the ideological doctrines of these women groups, identified areas of polarization, and discovered a discovered how these groups have found ways to build trust and build a cohesive civil society by women and for women.

=== Sharia courts ===
Sharia allows men to have multiple wives, as he would be solely responsible to meet the needs of the women married and in inheritance cases, the male would inherit more as he would need to spend this favourably on his wives and children, providing for them at his utmost. Non-Muslim women, and Muslim women in four states, enjoy equal parental rights. There may be employment discrimination against women, but not due to any Islamic ruling. In the state of Kedah, women performers can only perform in front of female audiences.

=== Sexual harassment ===
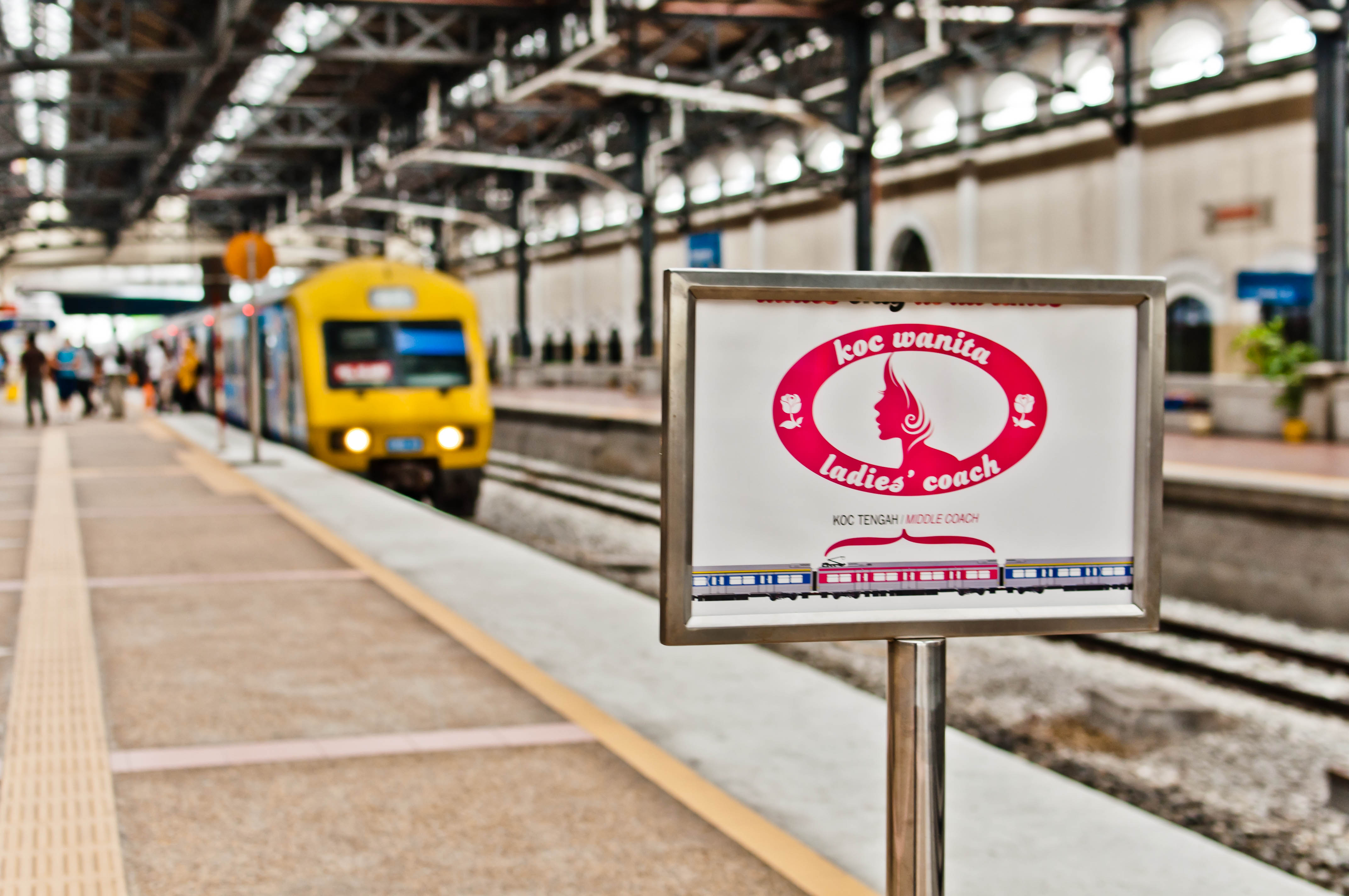
A designated commuter section for women only in Kuala Lumpur.

In Malaysia, sexual harassment, as defined by the Employment Act 1955, is "any unwanted conduct of a sexual nature, whether verbal, non-verbal, visual, gestural or physical, directed at a person which is offensive, humiliating or a threat to their well-being". The Act does not distinguish between male and female or employer and employee. As such, sexual harassment can be committed by a female against a male, or an employee against an employer.

The earliest recorded cases of sexual harassment at the workplace or misconduct of an employer towards an employee were seen as far back as 1939, at the time when Malaysia was still Malaya under the British colonial rule. The Klang Indian Association organised a strike action condemning the molestation of female workers by Europeans and 'Black Europeans'. In 1950, 106 women and men rubber tappers from Panavan Karupiah Estate in Perak went on strike against sexual molestation.

Sexual harassment is common, and since 2010 trains on the Malaysian Railway have included pink-coloured women-only cars as a means of cutting down on it. There are also women-only buses in Kuala Lumpur since 2010. In 2011, the government launched a women-only taxi service in the greater Kuala Lumpur area. The taxis have women drivers, and operate on an on-call basis.

=== Female genital mutilation ===
Female genital mutilation (FGM) is practised in Malaysia, with an estimated of more than 90% of women from Muslim families having undergone the practice. Reasons cited for the performance of FGM include religious obligation, hygiene, cultural practices, and the belief that it prevents pre-marital sex. However, the form of FGM practised in the country is not as severe as in other parts of the world, such as Northeast Africa, and is reported to only consist of a minor cut. Yet, the extent of the practice is not fully known and is mainly based on anecdotal reports and anthropological studies, as neither reports by national groups nor documented evidence have been found. FGM is widely viewed as a religious obligation; in 2009, the Fatwa Committee of Malaysia's National Council of Islamic Religious Affairs ruled that FGM was obligatory for Muslims, but that harmful forms of it must be avoided.

=== Domestic violence ===
Women in Malaysia have certain protections from domestic violence (DV), including the Domestic Violence Act 1994. Under the Penal Code, women may charge their husbands for acts of abuse such as physical violence or threats—the only criminal offence with a marital exemption is Rape (Art 375). Marital rape (non-consensual sexual intercourse in marriage) is not, in and of itself, illegal, but a man who "causes hurt or fear of death or hurt to his wife or any other person in order to have sexual intercourse with his wife" commits a crime under Art 375A of the Penal Code. According to one study, in Malaysia, 39% of women above 15 years of age have been physically abused by their partners. Domestic violence is increasingly seen as a public issue: Women's Aid Organisation (WAO) has introduced a SMS helpline for victims of DV.

There is controversy as to what acts constitute DV, either under the Domestic Violence Act 1994 or under the Penal Code. This rests on the interpretation of legal terms, on how DV relates to marriage laws which require the wife to obey her husband's lawful demands (see below), and on how the Domestic Violence Act 1994 relates to the Penal Code and to Syariah Courts. The debate is on what type of coercion may a husband use to compel his wife to perform her duties. Controversially, the Section 2—Interpretation, subsection (c), of the Domestic Violence Act 1994 makes reference to "compelling the victim by force or threat to engage in any conduct or act, sexual or otherwise, from which the victim has right to abstain". This suggests that if the act was one to which the wife is legally obligated to submit, this specific section cannot apply—meaning that in this circumstance, the "force" or "threat" do not fall under the definition of DV under this act. However, this rests on the definition of "force" or "threat", as some acts are clearly prohibited under the previous subsections (a) and (b) of the same act—"willfully or knowingly placing, or attempting to place, the victim in fear of physical injury" and "causing physical injury to the victim by such act which is known or, ought to have been known would result in physical injury" are indeed prohibited. The approach to DV in Malaysia has been criticised as weak, and potentially creating problematic legal loopholes.

=== Sex trafficking ===
Some women and girls have been victims of sex trafficking in Malaysia. They have been forced into prostitution and marriages in Asia and other continents and are physically and psychologically abused.

== Marriage and family life ==
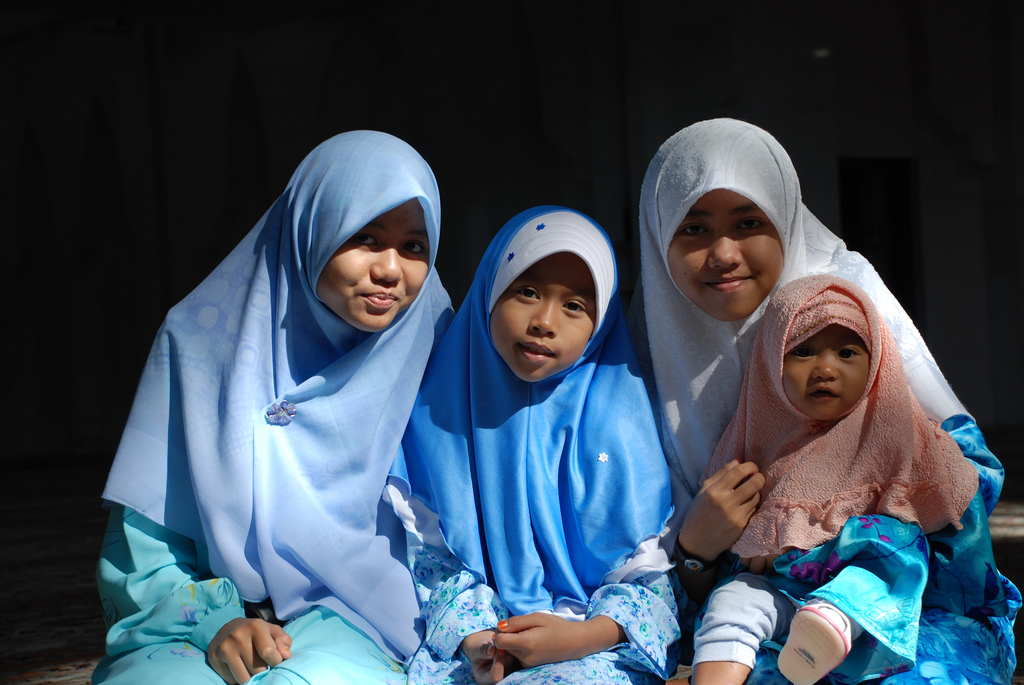
Muslim girls in Malaysia.

Women in Malaysia have restrictions in marriage, although some of their rights are protected. Under the Islamic Family Law, the wife's maintenance by her husband is conditioned by her obedience. Art. 59(2) states that: "2) Subject to Hukum Syarak and confirmation by the Court, a wife shall not be entitled to maintenance when she is nusyuz or unreasonably refuses to obey the lawful wishes or commands of her husband, that is to say, inter alia – (a) when she withholds her association with her husband; (b) when she leaves her husband's home against his will; or (c) when she refuses to move with him to another home or place, without any valid reason according to Hukum Syarak. However, some rights of the wife (in regard to property, court cases, and bank accounts) are protected by the Married Women Act, 1957 (Act. 450), at Art. 4 - Capacity of married women.

Malaysia outlawed marital rape in 2007.

== Education ==
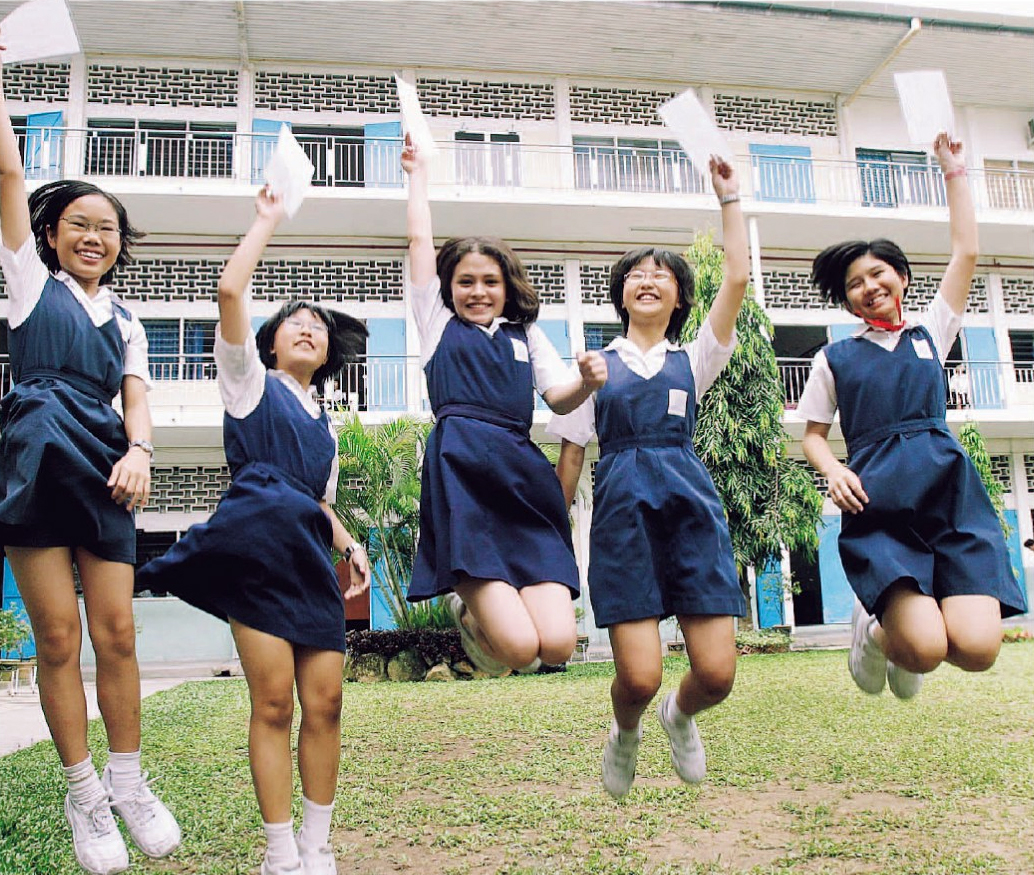
Malaysian female students

The literacy rate is lower for females (90.7%) compared to males (95.4%)—estimates as of 2010, for population aged 15 and over. Malaysia, has, in recent years invested in the education of both sexes; and as a result, more girls are now studying at the university level.

== Criticism of women's status in Malaysia ==
In 2006, an active campaigner for women's rights, described the status of Muslim women in Malaysia as similar to that of Black South Africans under apartheid.

Marina's remarks were made in response to a new Islamic law that enables men to divorce or take up to four wives. The law also granted husbands more authority over their wives' property. Conservative groups such as the Malaysian Muslim Professionals Forum criticised her comments for insulting Sharia and undermining the prominent role of women in Malaysia compared to other Muslim and/or east Asian countries.

In July 2021, 6 Malaysian women launched legal action against the government over outdated citizenship laws, which risk trapping women in abusive relationships and can leave children stateless. Lawyers say a win in the case against the government could help tens of thousands of binational families gain citizenship and would also pressure other countries to change their own citizenship laws.

On September 9. 2021, Malaysia's High Court ruled in favor of a group of Malaysian mothers who were seeking to pass on their nationality to their children born overseas. The judge ruled that the current citizenship law on its own is discriminatory and must be read together with another constitutional clause that outlaws gender discrimination.

== Advocacy groups ==
- Sisters in Islam
- Women's Aid Organisation, NGO
- All Women's Action Society, AWAM

== See also ==
- List of female cabinet ministers of Malaysia
- Policewoman of Malaysia
- Obedient Wives Club, first established in Malaysia

General:

- Aurat (Malay language)
- Human rights in Malaysia
- Musawah
- Sisters in Islam
- Islamic feminism
- Women in Islam
- Women in Asia
