= Police Volunteer Reserve Corp (Malaysia) =

The Royal Malaysia Police Volunteer Reserve (RMPVR) (Malay: Sukarelawan Simpanan Polis) is a team of special police as well as the supporting element to the full-time Royal Malaysian Police force where normal citizens could volunteer to help to maintain peace and security of their respective formation. The RMPVR officers is mainly composed of professionals such as the architects, engineers, lawyers, teachers, doctors, businessmen and senior government officers. Under the National Blue Ocean Strategies, in 2017, government drive to recruit RMPVR officers is targeted to have 50,000 people from all walks of like . Currently, there are 6,975 PVR officers in Malaysia as of 31 December 2022.

A police volunteer reserve officer when performing police duties shall have the same powers and duties and the same protection and immunities and shall be subject to the same authority and discipline as a regular police officer of corresponding rank. This means RMPVR officers have identical powers to their regular (full-time) colleagues including to carry and use of firearm, conduct search and arrest while on duty and are deemed to be civil servant. They play four main roles, as reported in a recent study.

== History ==
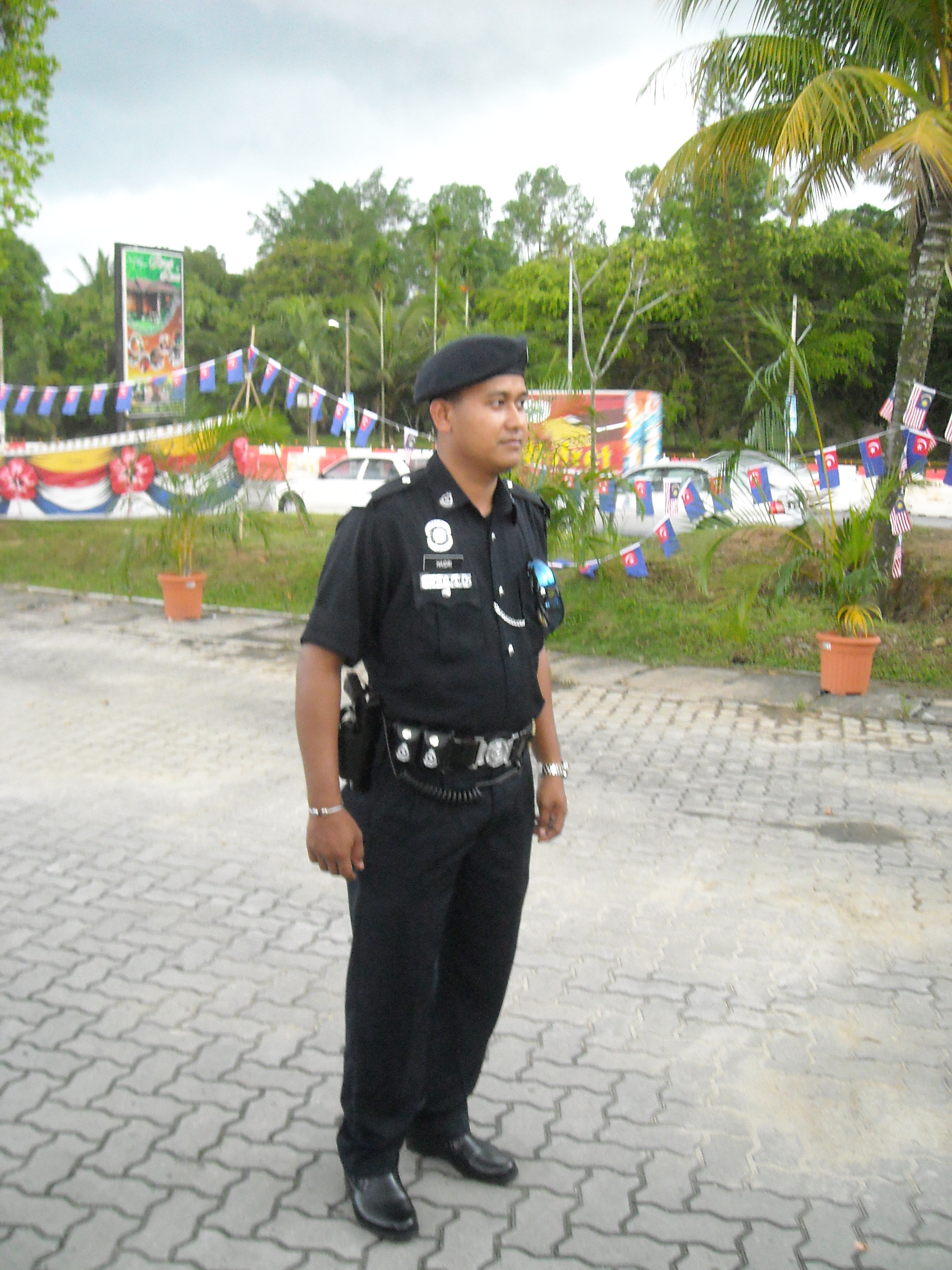
The PVR during the guard the Danga Bay.

RMPVR is created as a formation under the police authorities since 3 May 1956 which is known as Special Operations Volunteer Force. The philosophy of the RMPVR existence is to give opportunity to civilians to transform themselves into police careers. The RMPVR officer and personnel perform the same kind of duties as regular police officers, in enforcing the law and maintaining peace and security in their respective formation.

== Qualification of PVR ==
The police volunteer reserve applicants is expected to pass the same requirement like those who applying for a regular police officer position except that the age requirement is from 18 to 45 years old for PVR. The aspiring police volunteer reserve needs to be a full-time employee of any corporate company, established association, and preferably employees serving in the government sector. The police volunteer reserve applicants need to get clearance from their employers or head of departments before they decide to join the Royal Malaysia Police Volunteer Reserve Force. Malaysian citizen who is qualified are invited to be part of Royal Malaysian Police Volunteer Reserve Force from all states in Malaysia. Those who are interested can apply from Royal Malaysia Police website through Sistem Semakan Online (SSO).

=== Training ===
Standard police training will be conducted for 6 month or more at police contingent or one week continuous training at the nearby police academy (PULAPOL) and latter training at their respected district police station. A local training will be conducted regularly in their formation throughout their service. When undergoing continuous training or called for active duty, the Police Volunteer Reserve is entitled to receive basic salary and any type of allowances based on as a regular police officer of equivalent rank.

== Organizations of PVR ==
Police Volunteer Reserve Commandant appointed in each contingent is responsible to the State Police Chief for the following: -

- General advice on all matters on recruitment, appointment, promotion, discipline and Police Volunteer Reserve welfare;
- Supervision of training and general administration of Police Volunteer Reserve Force.

Officer-in Charge Police Volunteer Reserve District (KSPD) are usually commanded by Gazette Officer which is Deputy Superintendent of Police (DSP/SP) Police Volunteer for district level. While police station level is commanded by Gazette Officer which is Inspector of Police (INSP/SP) called as Officer-in Charge Police Volunteer Reserve Station (KSPB) respectively. Police Volunteer Reserve are under the supervision of the Officer-in Charge Police District (OCPD) and Head of Department where they are stationed and duty at.

RMPVR officer and personnel when on duty shall be deemed junior in the ranks of their regular police officer counterparts. As an example: Deputy Superintendent of Police Volunteer DSP/SP deemed junior to the same rank of DSP in regular police force, but it is higher ranking to Assistant Superintendent of Police of regular police (ASP), police volunteer reserve (ASP/SP) and auxiliary police (ASP/PB). A Police Volunteer Reserve gazette officer when on duty and in uniform, is entitled to receive a salute from lower ranks gazette officer and personnel whether in regular police force, police volunteer reserve force and auxiliary police force as stated in IGSO A109 under Section 3.4 dan IGSO H601 under section 3.13.10.

== RMPVR Rank Structure ==
RMPVR Officers and Personnel current ranks:-

Senior & Junior Gazette Officer

1. Assistant Commissioner of Police (ACP/SP)

2. Superintendent of Police (SUPT/SP)

3. Deputy Superintendent of Police (DSP/SP)

4. Assistant Superintendent of Police (ASP/SP)

5. Inspector of Police (INSP/SP)

Senior/Junior NCOs & Enlisted

6. Sub-Inspector of Police (SI/SP)

7. Sergeant Major of Police (SM/SP)

8. Sergeant of Police (SJN/SP)

9. Corporal of Police (KPL/SP)

10. Lance Corporal of Police (L/KPL/SP)

11. Police Constable (KONST/SP)

== Duties of RMPVR ==
When a RMPVR officer and personnel were deployed for active duty they may be assigned to any task according to their training, experience, technical knowledge or expertise and physical strength that suits them. The duties undertaken by personnel of police volunteer reserve when not actively deployed as instruct by the Malaysian Inspector General of Police (IGP), is as follows:-

1.1 Beat (police) assignment;

1.2 Patrol; on Motorbike (RCJ & URB) / Mobile Patrol Vehicle (MPV);

1.3 Administrative;

1.4 Duties in the District Control Centre (DCC) or Contingent Control Centre (CCC);

1.5 Officer on Duty for Gazette Police Officer (rank Inspector/sp and above) at Contingent or District Level;

1.6 Transport duties (MT) or WT for Marine;

1.7 Enquiry Office (EO) Counter;

1.8 Traffic;

1.9 Crowd Control;

They are not usually assigned to: -

2.1 Investigate Criminal Cases;

2.2 Court Duty;

2.3 General Operations Force (GOF) Operations;

2.4 Anti Riot Unit (FRU);

2.5 Special Branch (SB);

2.6 Jury.

When deployed for active duty, the Police Volunteer Reserve is subject to the same power and disciplinary procedures as their regular police counterparts by the police: Conduct and Discipline, Junior Police Officers and Constables Regulations, 1970, and the Police Force Commission's Instrument of Delegation of Certain Functions, Powers, Duties and Responsibilities, 1976.

== See also ==
- Suksis
- Volunteer Special Constabulary
- Sukarelawan Polis
