= Civil Aviation Act 1969 =

Parliament of Malaysia
- Long title: An Act to make better provision in the law relating to Civil Aviation and for matters connected therewith and ancillary to it.
- Citation: Act 3
- Territorial extent: Throughout Malaysia
- Passed by: Dewan Rakyat
- Passed: 11 January 1969
- Passed by: Dewan Negara
- Passed: 27 January 1969
- Royal assent: 15 February 1969
- Commenced: 27 February 1969
- Effective: 27 February 1969; Part IIIA: Peninsular Malaysia—1 May 1975, P.U. (B) 163/1975

Legislative history

First chamber: Dewan Rakyat
- Bill title: Civil Aviation Bill 1969
- Introduced by: Sardon Jubir, Minister of Transport
- First reading: 10 January 1969
- Second reading: 11 January 1969
- Third reading: 11 January 1969

Second chamber: Dewan Negara
- Bill title: Civil Aviation Bill 1969
- Member(s) in charge: Abdul Ghafar Baba, Minister without Portfolio
- First reading: 27 January 1969
- Second reading: 27 January 1969
- Third reading: 27 January 1969

Amended by
- Civil Aviation (Amendment) Act 1975 [Act A282] Malaysian Currency (Ringgit) Act 1975 [Act 160] Civil Aviation (Amendment) Act 1987 [Act A679] Civil Aviation (Amendment) Act 1991 [Act A803] Constitution (Amendment) Act 1994 [Act A885] Civil Aviation (Amendment) Act 1999 [Act A1062] Civil Aviation (Amendment) Act 2003 [Act A1192] Civil Aviation (Amendment) Act 2015 [Act A1497]

Related legislation
- Civil Aviation Act 1949 of the United Kingdom; Colonial Civil Aviation (Application of Act) Order 1952 of the United Kingdom; Aerodromes (Control of Obstructions) Ordinance of Sabah [Cap. 3] Aerodromes (Control of Obstructions) Ordinance 1950 [F. of M. No. 25 of 1950] Air Navigation Ordinance of Sabah [Cap. 5] Air Navigation Ordinance of Sarawak [Cap. 129] Air Navigation Ordinance 1952 [F. of M. No. 84 of 1952] in force in the States of Malaya other than Malacca and Penang; Air Navigation Ordinance [S.S. Cap. 108] in force in Malacca and Penang; Air Navigation (Wreck and Salvage) Regulations 1953 [L.N. 586 of 1953] Air Navigation Aids (Control of Obstructions) Act 1962 [F. of M. No. 30 of 1962]

Keywords
- Civil aviation
- Status: In force

The Civil Aviation Act 1969 (Malay: Akta Penerbangan Awam 1969), is an Act of the Parliament of Malaysia, which was enacted to make better provision in the law relating to Civil Aviation and for matters connected therewith and ancillary to it.

== Structure ==
The Civil Aviation Act 1969, in its current form (27 August 2015), consists of 10 Parts containing 28 sections and 1 schedule (including 8 amendments).

- Part I: Preliminary
- Part IA: Duties and Functions of the Director General of Civil Aviation Malaysia
- Part II: Regulation of Civil Aviation
- Part III: Establishment and Operation of Aerodromes
- Part IIIA: Civil Aviation Fund
- Part IV: Control of Obstructions in Vicinity of Aerodromes
- Part V: Liability for Damage Caused by Aircraft
- Part VI: Detention of Aircraft
- Part VII: Wreck and Salvage
- Part VIII: Restriction on Claims for Damages and Compensation
- Part VIIIA: Licence to Provide Airport and Aviation Services
- Part VIIIB: Enforcement and Investigation
- Part IX: Miscellaneous
- Part X: Transitionals
- Schedule
