= Police Undergraduate Voluntary Corps =

Undergraduate police volunteer organization in Malaysia

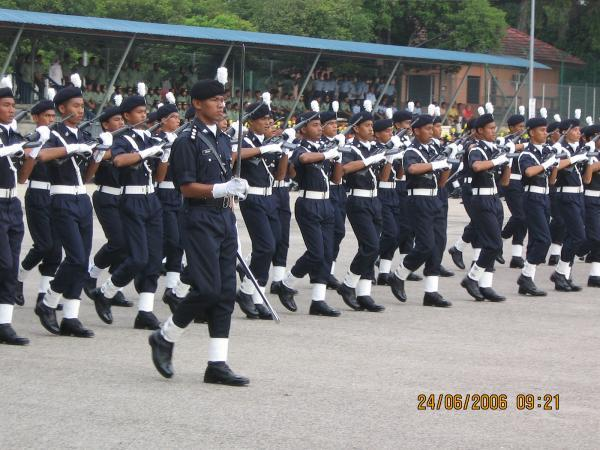
SUKSIS Parade in UiTM

Police Undergraduate Voluntary Corps (Malay: Kor Sukarelawan Polis Siswa Siswi, abbreviated as SUKSIS) is an undergraduate police volunteer organisation in Malaysia. They are undergoing periodic training times to times in 3 years in their respective university and will be commissioned as Police Volunteer Reserve Corp Inspector by the Inspector General of Police in the end of the 3 years training.

== History ==
The idea of establishing Kor-Sukarelawan Siswa Polis's (SUKSIS) was inspired by YAB Dato' Seri Abdullah Hj. Ahmad Badawi, the 5th Malaysian Prime Minister. The establishment of SUKSIS corps in Malaysian Higher Learning Institution is believed to help producing excellent graduates who comply own viable competence, discipline and furnished with noble values, and high self-esteem.

In 2002, the Malaysian prime minister suggested to the former Inspector General of Police, Tan Sri Bakri Haji Omar to establish a curriculum in universities to bridge the gap between university students and the police. The main objective is to expose the police duty to the student selected to the new corps. Universiti Utara Malaysia (Northern University of Malaysia) volunteered and became the first University in Malaysia to have such force. The creation of the corp in universities also allowed those who had not participated in school to join and get a better understanding of the police and their service to the public. The realisation of the importance of the policemen duties would move graduates to opt for a career in the police. The establishment the Police Undergraduate Voluntary Corp (SUKSIS's Corps) will act as points and ears Royal Malaysian Police (RMP) in channel information about crime scene in local area.

The Royal Malaysian Police and Education Department had found that cadets showed a high level of discipline and stayed away from social ills such as drug abuse and truancy.

There were many suggestions for the name of the new force to be established in the universities, and the name Kor Sukarelawan Polis Siswa (SUKSIS) was chosen, meaning "Student's Police Volunteer Reserve Corps" Or "Police Undergraduate Volunteers Force"

== Training ==
As membership Kor-SUKSIS fill by undergraduate first year IPTA, training period that prescribed is three years while follow training arrangement that prescribed 360 time viz 129 time for weekly training and 240 time when semester break. Training time division also is as many as 200 time for outside training activity and 160 time for academic classes. However, stated fraction can still adjusted following need-of.

To meet arrangement and training fraction which has been prescribed, kor-SUKSIS UMS had set compulsory activities following: Feet March, Arms March, Sword March, Stick March, Circuit Test, Arms Class, Training Shoot, Light Strike Force (LSF), Life Effort, Robust St, First Aid, Swimming, Person Defensive Art, General Operation Force(PGA) Training, Practical Delegation In Nearby IPD, Cultured / Build Person, Mess Night, Law Class, After Dinner Talk', Community service, Kor-SUKSISAnnual Camp, Kor-SUKSIS Family Day Kor-SUKSIS, Kor-SUKSIS Sport Festival, Council To Swear / Drug Pledge, Examination (March, Shooting, Physical Spirit Testing), Convocation Ceremony, and End Parade Ceremony Training.

== Equipments ==
=== Uniform ===
The standard Suksis uniform is similar to that of the Royal Malaysian Police. SUKSIS wear standard issue black berets with the emblem of police on the top corner above the left eye. In November 2003, SUKSIS were issued standard issue black walking shoes. Starting July 2004, the Royal Malaysian police started to issue 'black zip', a shoe that is also a standard issue for the regular police force.

== Duty ==
Kor Suksis is a member of the Volunteer Police. While on duty they have the same duties and powers as regular police. But life as a Suksis member is focused more on training and academics. So they are called to perform tasks such as Beat (police) and patrol and peacekeeping during the events organized by the university, general or by-elections, and during practical training at IPD. During practice, they will follow the general duty tasks such as beat and patrol, inquiry office, MPV patrol, and others deemed necessary as part of training by the training officer. There are more than 21 universities in Malaysia that have SUKSIS, they are:

- UiTM (Universiti Teknologi MARA, Shah Alam campus)
- UiTM (Universiti Teknologi MARA, Pulau Pinang campus)
- UiTM (Universiti Teknologi MARA, Arau campus)
- UiTM (Universiti Teknologi MARA, Kedah campus)
- UiTM (Universiti Teknologi MARA, Seremban campus)
- UUM (Universiti Utara Malaysia)
- UPM (Universiti Putra Malaysia)
- UKM (Universiti Kebangsaan Malaysia)
- USM (Universiti Sains Malaysia)
- UMK (Universiti Malaysia Kelantan)
- UMS (Universiti Malaysia Sabah)
- UNIMAS (Universiti Malaysia Sarawak)
- UPSI (Universiti Pendidikan Sultan Idris)
- UIA (International Islamic University Malaysia)
- UTM (Universiti Teknologi Malaysia)
- UTHM (Universiti Tun Hussein Onn Malaysia)
- UMT (Universiti Malaysia Terengganu)
- USIM (Universiti Sains Islam Malaysia)
- UniSZA (Universiti Sultan Zainal Abidin)
- UniMAP(Universiti Malaysia Perlis)
- UMP(Universiti Malaysia Pahang)
- UTeM (Universiti Teknikal Malaysia Melaka)
- UM (Universiti Malaya)

The voluntary police corps was officially established on 24 June 2006. The corps was honoured by the ex-Inspector General of Police, Tan Sri Bakri Hj Omar. The parade was held at the parade field in UiTM Shah Alam campus and it was led by the acting assistant superintendent of police (ASP) Ezuwar Yahaya, who was assisted by 5 actings Inspectors, 1 Sergeant Major and two Sergeants. There was one honour parade and four platoons.

== First SUKSIS Police Stations ==
SUKSIS's corps currently has paid inside the team full a pride this when make his first time this corps set up a first police station at the campus of University of Sabah (UMS). UMS's Vice-chancellor, Prof. Dr. Mohd. Noh Dalimin says, worth about RM5 million that support fully operating expenditure allocation UMS and expected ready 4 January on next year. Idea to create the police station in campus is parallel with the aspirations of Prime Minister, Dato' Seri Abdullah Ahmad Badawi and Inspector-General of Police, Tan Sri Musa Hassan to establish SUKSIS Corps at the institutions of higher learning in Malaysia.

Willing Mohd. Noh, that police station furnished with facility meet specification a police station like enquiry office, operations room, office space, lock-up, specific store material, transport garage and armoury store.

The police station construction able to produce deep police environment campus apart from as a training centre police in among member SUKSIS and can respond the realised simulation policeman assignment practicality among UMS undergraduate. As well as stated police station construction coincide with challenges available today apart from bridging more co-operation among deep society and police handle crime.

Apart from that said him, the police station not only get help train undergraduate deep UMS police work even become research site and channel idea undergraduate, lecturer and in the intellectual UMS for increase another police excellence.
