= Special Operations Volunteer Force =

- Active: 1952–1960
- Country: United Kingdom; Federation of Malaya
- Type: Counterinsurgency
- Engagements: Malayan Emergency

The Special Operations Volunteer Force was a special program developed by the British and Malayan authorities during the Malayan Emergency. The unit existed from 1952 until the end of the Emergency in 1960.

== Origins ==
The Malayan Emergency began during the aftermath of the Second World War. As the British tried to repair the Malayan economy, the Malayan Communist Party, or MCP, was organizing protests against labor conditions in the country. As the protests became more effective, the British responded with harsher measures. This in turn caused the protesters to become more militant, culminating in the beginning of organized violence with the assassination of three European plantation managers at Sungai Siput, Perak.

An emergency was declared by the British government to deal with the insurgency. Eventually, to counter the insurgency, as part of the plan for dealing with the insurgency, the British implemented the Briggs Plan. In addition to cutting off the guerrillas from the population which supported them, the British made efforts to induce guerrillas to defect. After the assassination of the High Commissioner in 1952, Lieutenant General Sir Gerald Templer was sent out to head British operations in Malaya. As part of his new program, an emphasis was placed on intelligence and psychological warfare operations. In addition to working at getting better intelligence, as well as forming relations with the locals in the regions where the insurgency had its greatest support, under Templer's lead captured insurgents were wooed to the British side. These defectors would eventually be employed in the Special Operations Volunteer Force.

== Formation ==
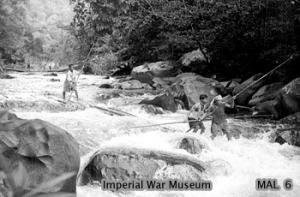
Indigenous forces patrol fording a river while operating in the Malayan Jungle. SOVF forces typically operated in the remote regions populated by the ethnic Chinese where the MCP had most of its support during the Malayan Emergency.

Under Templer's direction, psychological warfare was given special emphasis. As part of this strategy, surrendered or captured enemy guerrilla's, referred to as "surrendered enemy personnel" or SEPs and "captured enemy personnel" or CEPs, were treated as valuable resources. They were thoroughly debriefed, but always with an eye towards inducing continuing help rather than as a resource to be exhausted. The goal, through bribery or inducement, was to get the SEP/CEP to switch sides and fight on behalf of the government forces.

The Special Operations Volunteer Force, or the SOVF, came into existence in 1952. The program, although a military one, was controlled by the Special Branch. It was formed from surrendered communist insurgents. The goal was to put the guerrilla's experience to work for the British. SEP/CEP volunteers to the SOVF committed to serving for 18 months. They were paid at the same rate as the junior police officers and were based in the same police compounds from which other government forces operated. SEP/CEP volunteers were formed into platoons and placed under the command of a British police officer. At the start of the program, there were approximately 180 SEP/CEP volunteers which were formed into twelve platoons, each with 15 former guerrillas and a British police officer.

Typically, a SOVF platoon would operate near villages in the region where the disaffected ethnic Chinese, the portion of the population supporting the MCP, lived. In the field, the SOVF platoons operated according to the former guerrillas' experience. They would dress in clothing similar, carry weapons that the MCP guerrillas carried, and operated according to the same doctrine. However, the SOVF's mission was geared equally to inducing further defections. Although SOVF platoons could induce defections, they were also adept at eliminating MCP fighters, as well as spreading confusion among the MCP through so-called psyop and "black" tactics.

== Life after the SOVF ==
After completing their tour with the SOVF, the former MCP guerrillas could return to Malayan society with a clean record. However, some SOVF members were deemed to be unsuited to be returned to civil society. For those in that situation, British and Malayan officials would send them to the Kemedore Agricultural Settlement. There, they would work the farms there until their rehabilitation was deemed complete.

== Impact ==
As part of the larger policy implemented by Templer, the SOVF helped to undermine the MCP's propaganda. The success of the program helped to induce larger numbers of MCP guerrillas defect to the British-Malayan side, reestablishing government control in what had previously been MCP controlled areas.

The success of the SOVF, as well as the British success as a whole, became part of the counterinsurgency taught to U.S. officers as the Vietnam War intensified. The American military emulated the SOVF strategy, though not the other components which made it a success, in the Kit Carson Scouts program for communist defectors in Vietnam.
