= Bersih 4 rally =

2015 Malaysian political rally

Bersih 4.0 rally
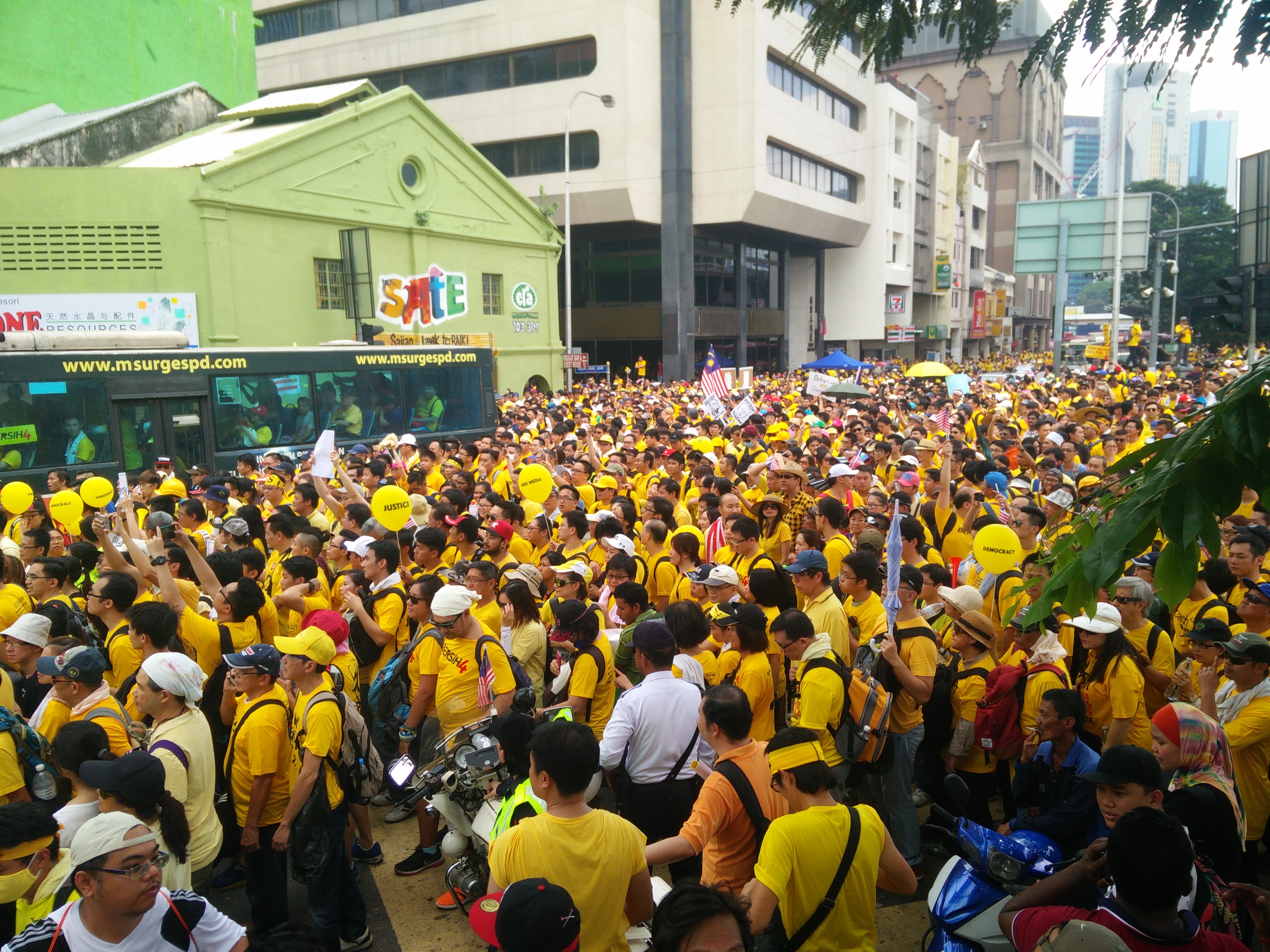
- Date: 29 August 2015 – 30 August 2015
- Location: Kuala Lumpur, Kota Kinabalu and Kuching
- Goals: Free and Fair Elections; A Clean Government; The Right to Dissent; Strengthening the Parliamentary Democracy; Saving the Economy of Malaysia; Resignation of the Prime Minister, Najib Razak

Number
Police estimation: 29,000 – 50,000 in KL Bersih estimation: 500,000 in KL (200,000 at peak)	

Casualties and losses
4 participants injured, 16 participants poisoned	

The Bersih 4.0 rally was a series of planned rallies carried out on 29 to 30 August 2015 in major cities in Malaysia, namely Kuala Lumpur, Kota Kinabalu and Kuching. There were subsequent rallies in over 70 cities around the world in support of the main rallies in Malaysia. The rallies were organised by The Coalition for Clean and Fair Elections (Malay: Gabungan Pilihanraya Bersih dan Adil) or Bersih (meaning clean in Malay) a coalition of non-government organisations which seeks to reform the current electoral system in Malaysia to ensure free, clean and fair elections. The rallies were being carried out with the objective to calling for clean and transparent governance in Malaysia as well as strengthening the parliamentary democracy system. The rallies are a followup to similar rallies that were carried out in 2007, 2011 and 2012. 30 August is the day before National Day which is on 31 August.

== Background ==
In the aftermath of the general elections in Malaysia in 2013 there were accusations by the opposition and non-governmental organisations that the government had cheated its way to another election victory. A series of rallies in 2013 were carried out protesting the results of the elections, whereby the opposition garnered a plurality of the votes but still lost the election due to the government gaining the most seats in the Westminster system of elections.

In 2015, a corruption scandal began to engulf Malaysia, involving a government super fund called 1Malaysia Development Berhad which was chaired by Prime Minister Najib Razak. There were a series of exposes by online investigative blogs, namely Sarawak Report and major news portal Wall Street Journal that money was being siphoned off from the fund into personal accounts of Najib and his close relations. A Public Accounts Committee compromising government and opposition members of parliament was set up to investigate if there were major wrongdoings on the part of Najib and 1MDB. However, in July, the government began to stifle news reports regarding the 1MDB scandal by blocking the website Sarawak Report, which had been in forefront of exposes revealing the losses incurred by 1MDB and its connection to Najib, from the Malaysian internet community. The government then began to withdraw the publishing license of The Edge, a financial and news publication which was reporting the 1MDB scandal. Furthermore, on 28 July, Najib began removing detractors in his cabinet and government such as Abdul Gani Patail, the Attorney General of Malaysia who was part of the task force investigating the 1MDB scandal, his deputy Muhyiddin Yassin and four other ministers who were said to be critical of 1MDB and called for Najib to explain the issue to the Malaysian public. The Public Accounts Committee investigating the 1MDB scandal was also suspended indefinitely with the promotion of four of its members to Deputy Ministers by Najib.

Currently there is a court case challenging the re-delineation of electoral boundaries in Sarawak, which if carried out would affect the next state elections in Sarawak. The re-delineation of the seats in Sarawak would see an increase of 71 to 82 seats in the state assembly, but the current contention is there was no proper explanation given for the planned increase. Bersih has stated that the case, which has been successfully appealed by the Election Commission, would allow it to carry out acts of gerrymandering and malapportionment.

== Bersih's demands ==
Bersih has set forth the following main objectives for their rallies:

- Free and Fair Elections (Pilihan Raya yang Bebas dan Adil)
- A Clean Government (Kerajaan yang Telus)
- The Right to Dissent (Hak untuk Membantah)
- Strengthening the Parliamentary Democracy (Memperkukuhkan Demokrasi Berparlimen)
- Saving the Economy of Malaysia (Menyelamatkan Ekonomi Malaysia)
- Resignation of the Prime Minister, Najib Razak (Perletakan Jawatan Perdana Menteri, Najib Razak)

== Participants ==
Opposition-owned media, Malay Mail, claimed the rally was attended by Malaysians of all races, with a 50–50 ratio between Malays and non-Malays. However, international media like Bloomberg reported that organisers themselves admitted, only about 30 percent of people were Malay, with the rally dominated by ethnic Chinese who have drifted from Najib's ruling coalition in recent years.

The following groups sent their members to the rallies:

- IKRAM
- ABIM
- Joint Action Group for Gender Equality
- Gerakan Anak Muda Sabah Menuntut Hak Rakyat (Gegar)
- Pacos Trust
- Jaringan Orang Asal SeMalaysia (Joas)
- Tonibung
- Himpunan Hijau
- People's Justice Party (PKR)
- Democratic Action Party
- Gerakan Harapan Baru (The New Hope Movement)

The following group will not participate in the rallies:

- Pan-Malaysian Islamic Party (PAS) – (will send representatives instead)

== Rally plans and pre-rally incidents ==
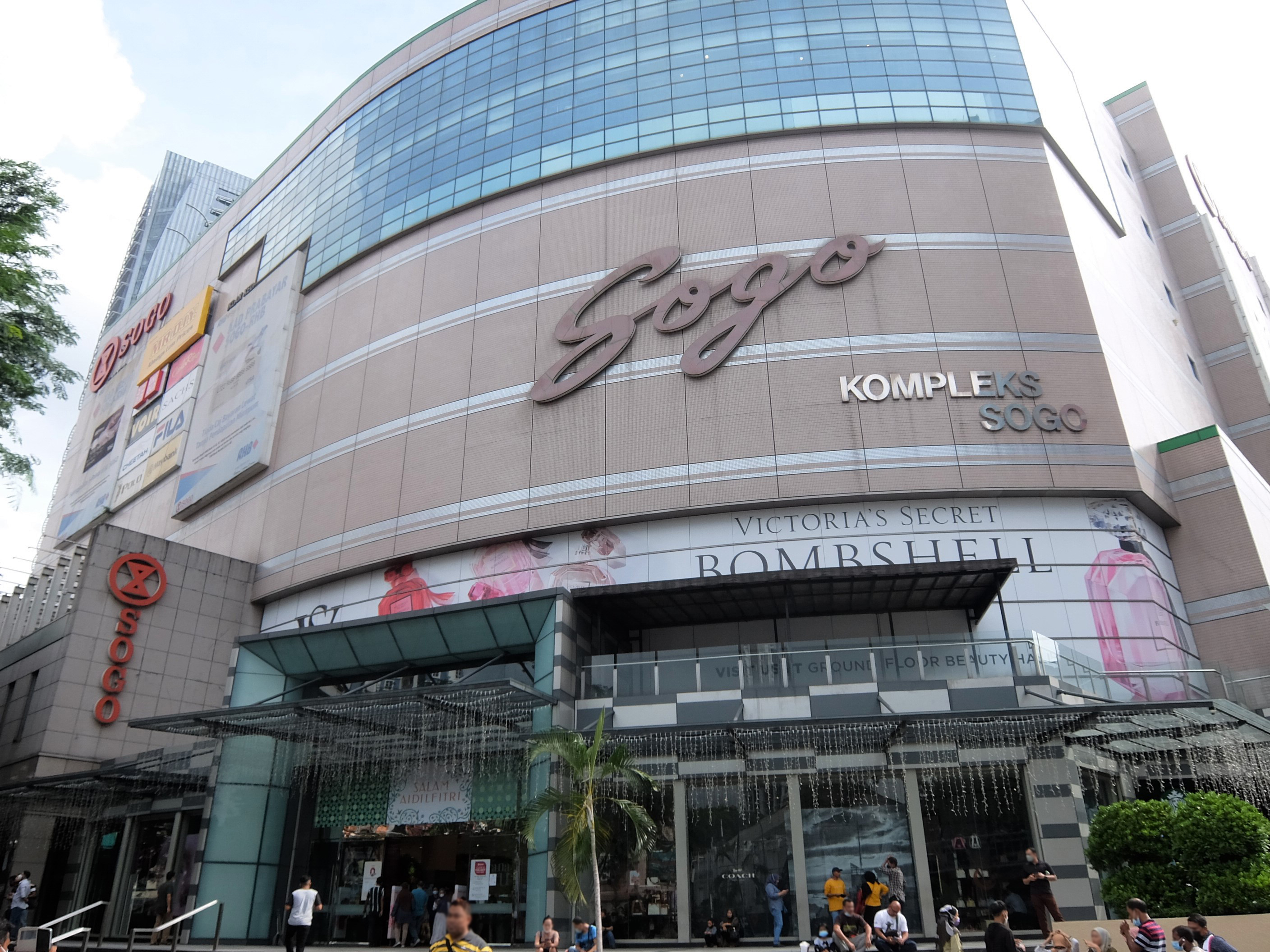
Sogo was designated one of the four gathering points for the rally in Kuala Lumpur

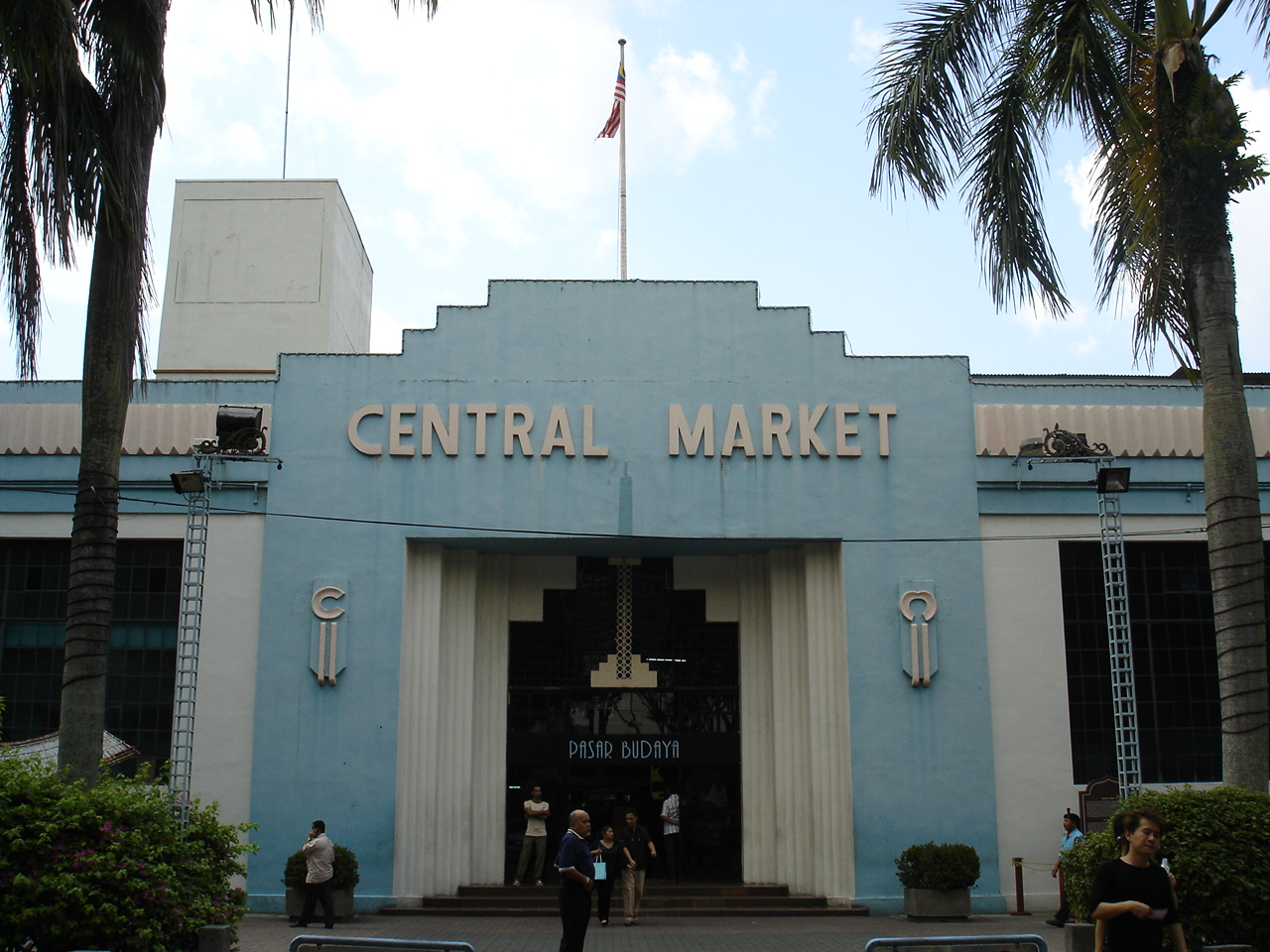
Central Market was one of the four gathering points for the rally in Kuala Lumpur

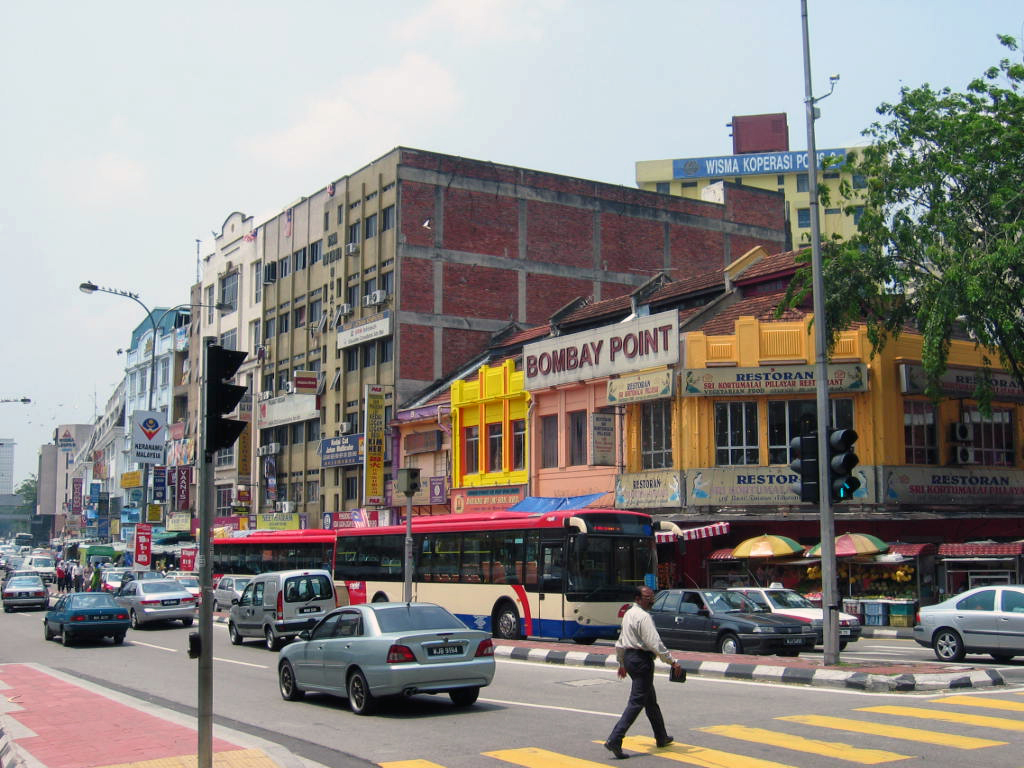
Brickfields was one of the four gathering points for the rally in Kuala Lumpur

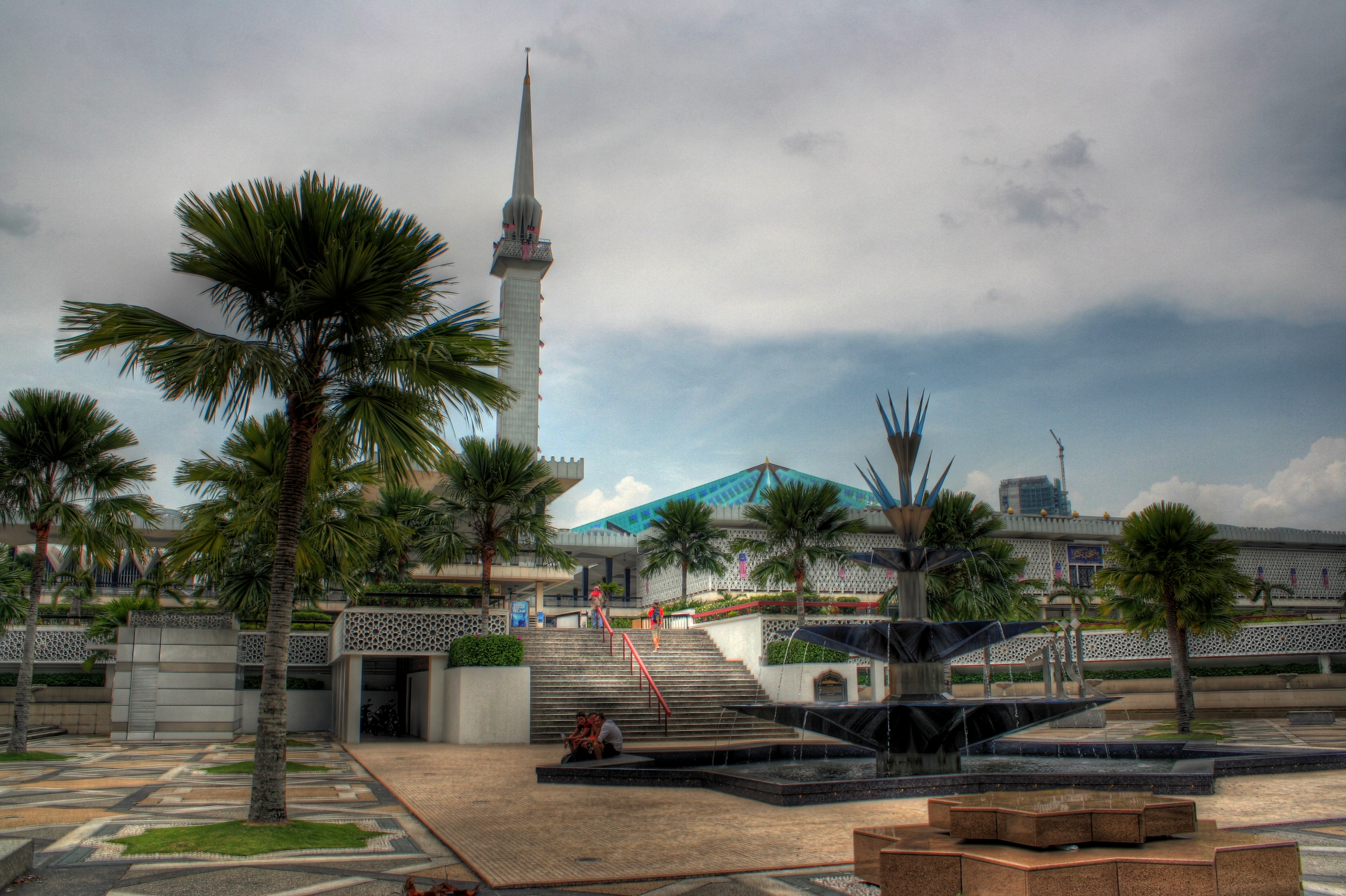
The National Mosque was one of the four gathering points for the rally in Kuala Lumpur

The Human Rights Commission of Malaysia (SUHAKAM) has announced that peaceful assemblies like Bersih cannot be banned under the law, and that the police has provide convincing and compelling reasons to justify preventing Bersih's right to assemble as provided under the Peaceful Assembly Act. The Bar Council of Malaysia have stated that it is illegal for the police to prohibit the Bersih rally from going ahead. The Bar Council has also prepared a team of lawyers to provide legal assistance to rally participants should they be arrested by the police. Furthermore, Lawyers for Liberty executive director Eric Paulsen said that it was irresponsible for the authorities to mislead the public and make exaggerated claims that the rally is illegal or out to topple the government.

A poll by Merdeka Center shows majority of Malaysian citizens oppose this rally (47% compare to 43% approve). 70% of Malays disapprove this rally while those who approve were the Internet-users, urbanites and Chinese.

Prime Minister Najib Razak has described the Bersih participants as 'shallow and poor' in patriotism. The Ministry of Home Affairs has released a gazetted order under the Printing Presses and Publications Act banning the wearing of yellow clothing with the wording 'Bersih 4' and any pamphlets promoting the rally. This was disputed by former Federal Court judge Gopal Sri Ram who said that with the exception of pamphlets or placards, Bersih 4 T-shirt does not fall under the definition of publications. The Higher Education Minister Idris Jusoh has warned undergraduates from participating in the Bersih rallies and that they would face action under the Universities and University Colleges Act 1971. The University Council and universities such as Universiti Teknologi MARA have warned on action to be taken on students who participate in the Bersih rallies, even threatening the students with suspension. The Malaysian Armed Forces chief Gen Zulkifeli Mohd Zin said that the military will intervene in the rallies if the government declares a state of emergency. Malaysian Navy has said action will be taken against navy personnel who took part in the Bersih rallies.

The Malaysian Communications and Multimedia Commission (MCMC), who regulates internet usage in Malaysia has announced on their Facebook page that it would begin to block websites that promote and spread information regarding the Bersih rallies on grounds that the rallies threaten national stability. Bersih has condemn the MCMC's decision and has asked the public to email the MCMC to complain, while stating they would also seek legal recourse if the MCMC's ban is not lifted by the time the rallies' start. Deputy Minister of the Communications and Multimedia ministry Jailani Johari said that internet news portals will not be exempted from being blocked if they report on the Bersih rallies. Four websites have been blocked by the MCMC from being accessible to Malaysian internet users.

A yellow Volkswagen Beetle owned by Bersih 2.0's Southern Vice-Chair Thomas Fann, that was going to be used in a roadshow to promote the Bersih 4 rally was vandalised. It was place in front of the protest stage during the rally for the whole world to see with all its scars - acid damaged paintwork and sprayed vulgarities and all . Bersih has started a photo campaign called "Bersih 4 Global Countdown" asking Malaysians all over the world to show their support for the rally by posting a picture of themselves with posters. Bersih has also announced record donations nearing 2 million ringgit. Furthermore, there have been records sales of yellow T-shirts with the Bersih logo with the shirts being sold out in a matter of days.

A pro-government group Himpunan Solidariti Untuk Mu Malaysia (Solidarity gathering for you Malaysia) aims to gather about 10,000 people at the Putra World Trade Centre (PWTC) to counter the Bersih rallies. The police have started investigating the group after they gave an exhibition showing off weapons and martial arts like silat, in anticipation of violence. After the leader of the anti-Bersih group Jamal Md Yunos was questioned by the police about the group's intentions, he announced that the counter-rally would be called off.

=== Kuala Lumpur ===
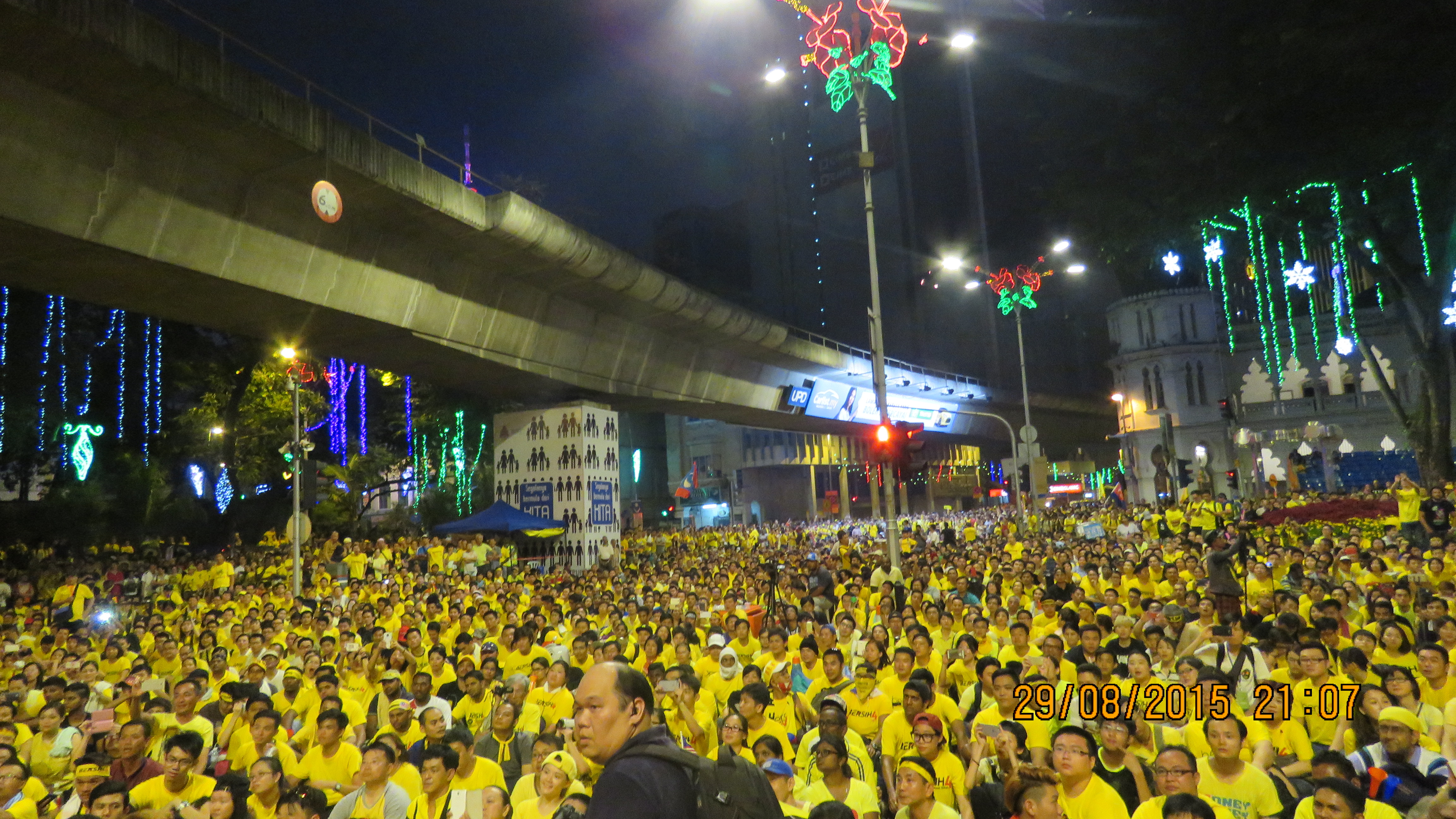
Crowd listening to Maria's speech in Merdeka Square, Kuala Lumpur

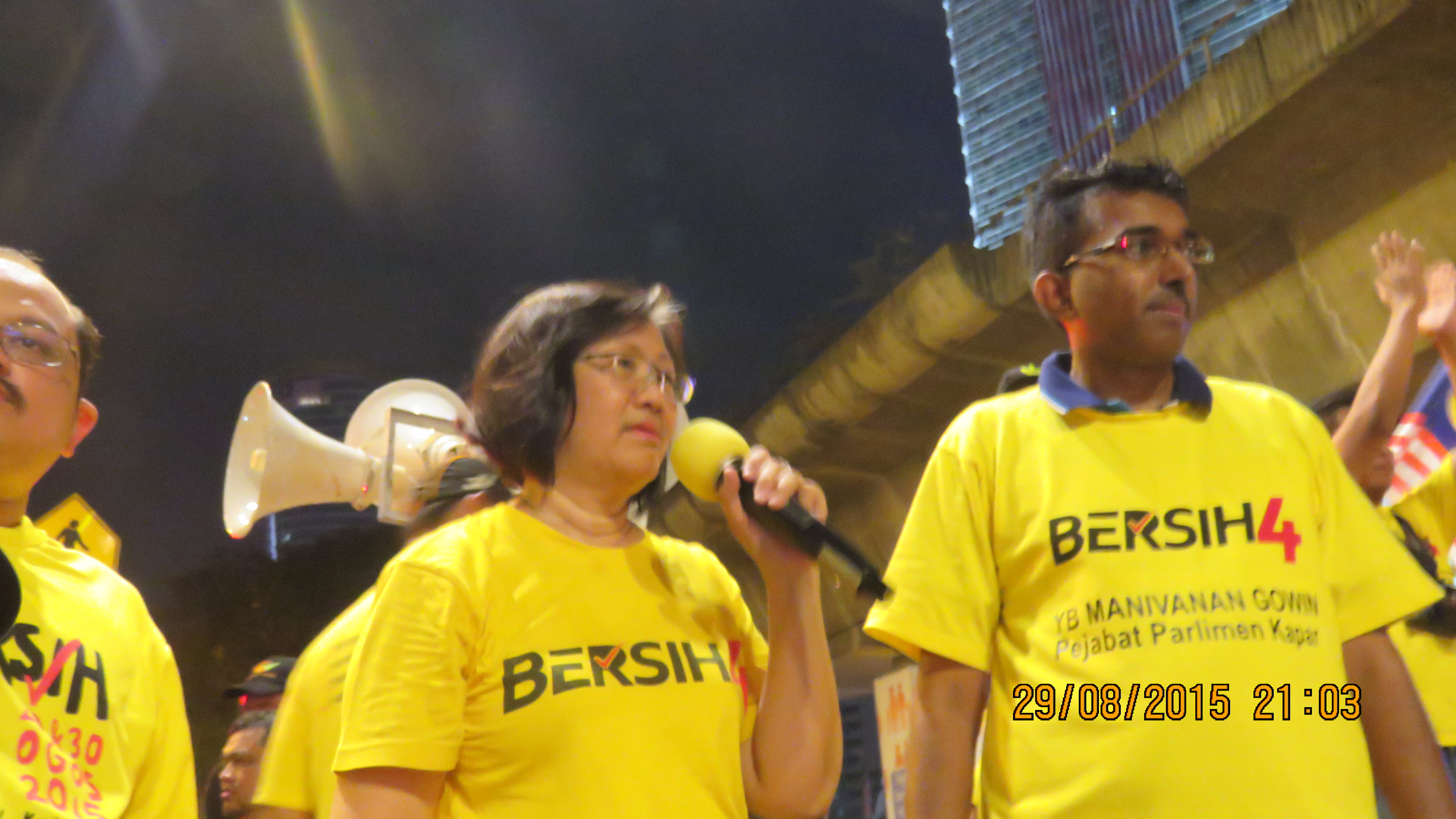
Maria Chin Abdullah, Chair of Bersih speaks

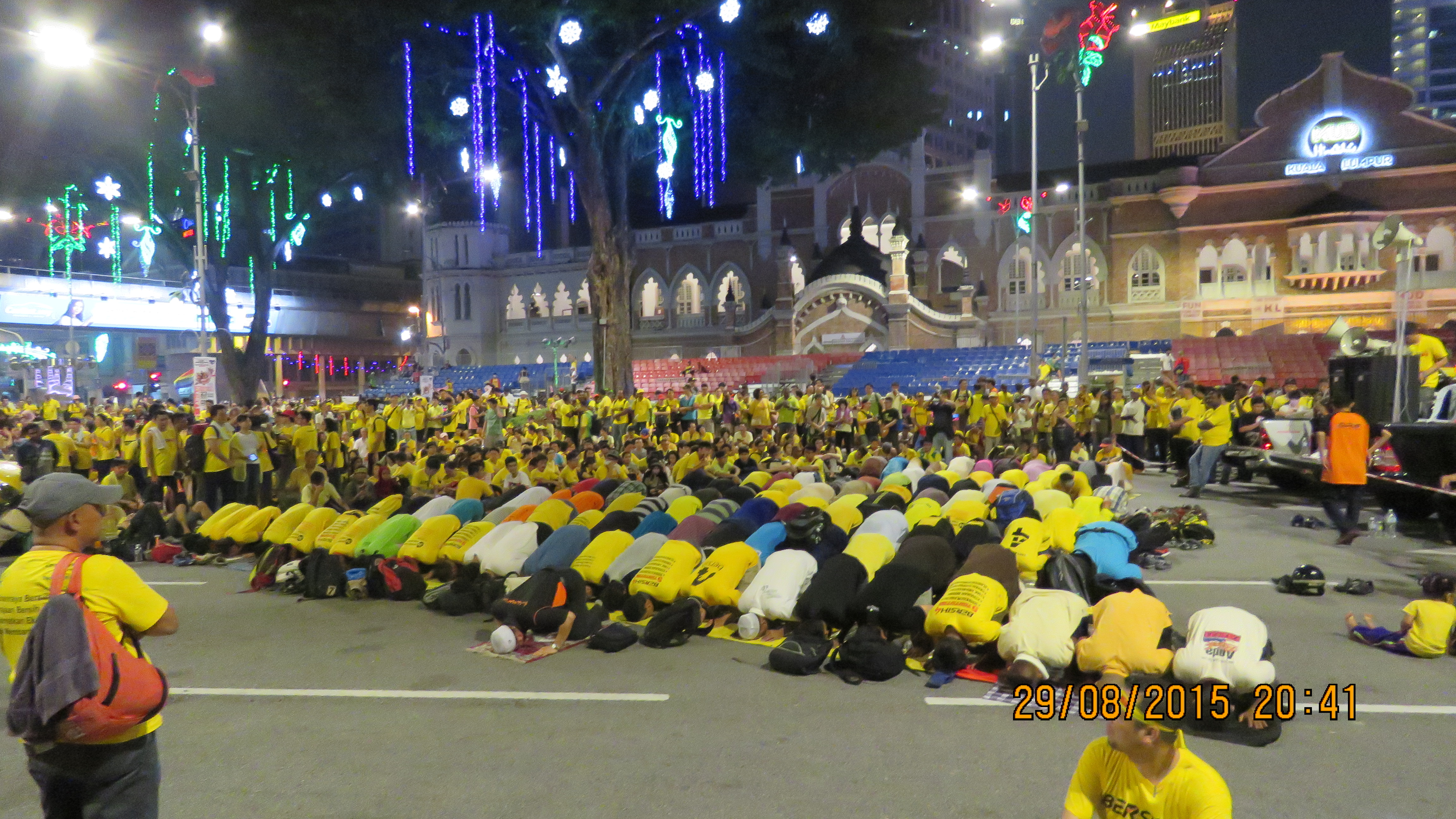
Muslims doing Isha Prayer while Chinese watching silently during Bersih 4

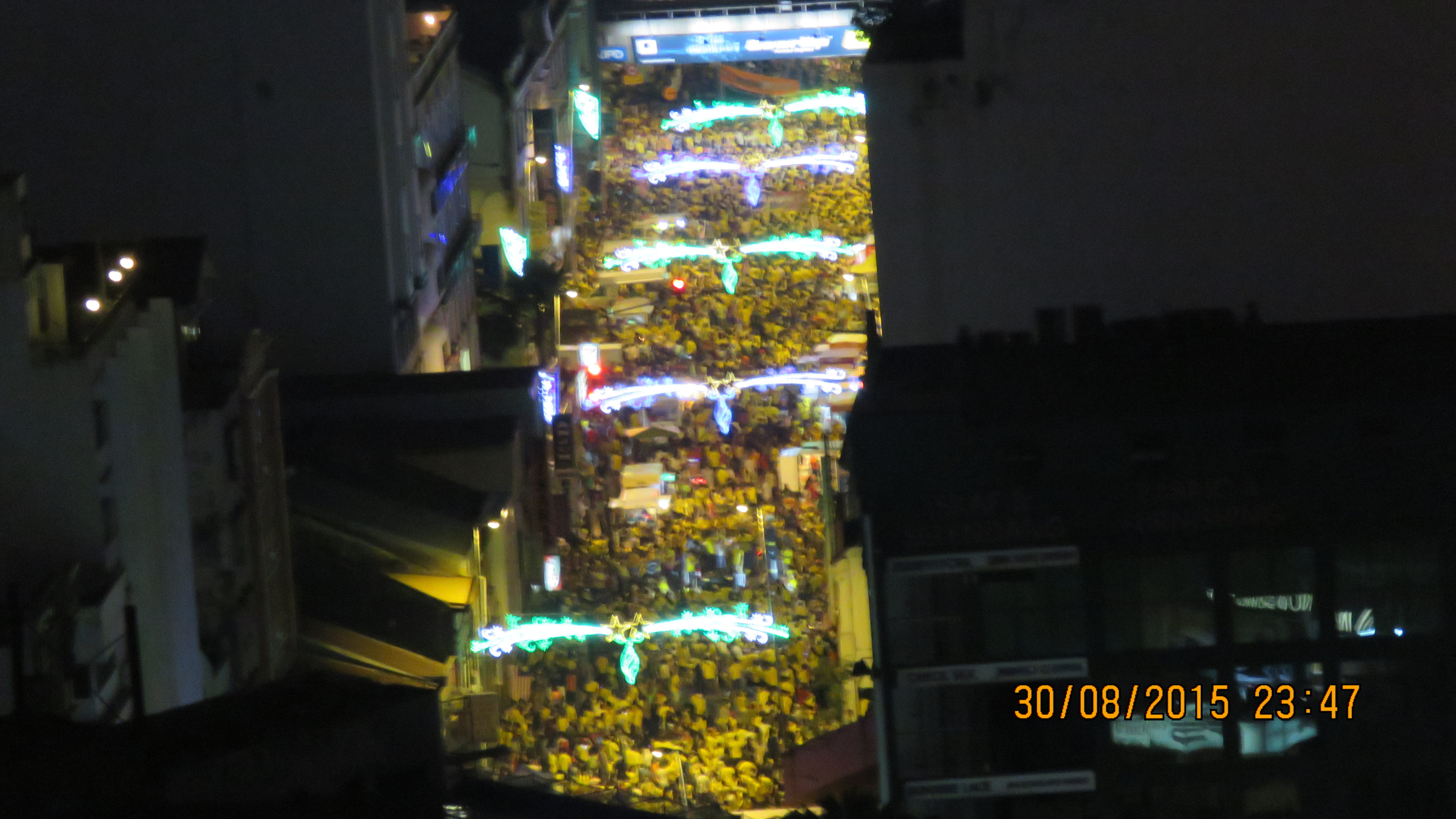
Aerial view of Bersih crowd in Jalan Tunku Abdul Rahman

The police have said that the rallies can go ahead with certain conditions, such as not disrupting businesses and inciting people to topple the government. Also ten days notice must be given to the police or a fine of RM10,000 would be meted out to the organisers as stipulated in the Peaceful Assembly Act 2012. Bersih has met up with police asking the police to ensure the safety and security of the participants, as well not to use tear gas as in previous Bersih rallies. Inspector-General of Police Tan Sri Khalid Abu Bakar has requested that Bersih use Bukit Jalil National Stadium instead of Dataran Merdeka as not to disrupt national day preparations. Kuala Lumpur Mayor Datuk Mhd Amin Nordin Abdul Aziz has refused Bersih's request to hold the rally at Dataran Merdeka. Thousands of police officers have been deployed around Kuala Lumpur in preparation for the rally. Kuala Lumpur City Hall has advised Bersih to postpone their rally for a week, which was refused and also gave alternative venues such as Titiwangsa, Merdeka Stadium and the National Stadium. Bersih has said they will stay out Dataran Merdeka, but will protest within its vicinity, which will include resting on the streets of Kuala Lumpur in participants' own sleeping bags. Bersih has advised participants of the rally to bring sleeping bags, blankets and umbrellas, including food and drink during the duration of the rallies. Bersih has set up five gathering points for the participants to start out before heading to Dataran Merdeka: Sogo, Pasar Seni, Dataran Maybank, Brickfields and the National Mosque.

Bersih has also arranged for 2000 volunteers to ensure crowd control and security to replace PAS' Unit Amal which was responsible for that in previous Bersih rallies. New Hope Movement (GHB) will organised around 500 volunteers called the Amal Relief, while People's Justice Party will be sending 700 of their Youth Wing AMK SKUAD to help keep order and security for the rally. On Day 2, former Prime Minister of Malaysia, Mahathir Mohamad and his wife, Siti Hasmah Mohamad Ali, attended the Bersih 4 rally, the rally saw tens of thousands demonstrating for Prime Minister Datuk Seri Najib Razak's resignation.

=== Kuching ===
The authorities have refused to grant a permit to Bersih to hold the rally at Padang Merdeka in Kuching and advised Bersih to seek alternative venues. Bersih has insisted that the rally in Padang Merdeka will go ahead despite the government's refusal to give them a permit, otherwise they have suggested the rally would be Song Kheng Hai recreational ground or Jubilee Ground Stadium. Bersih has been given the approval by the authorities to hold the Kuching rally at Song Kheng Hai field at Song Kheng Hai Food and Recreational Centre.

=== Kota Kinabalu ===
Bersih Sabah had announced that the Bersih rally would be at Tanjung Lipat waterfront esplanade on 29 Aug and will be much shorter than the Kuala Lumpur rally. Bersih has explained that the site is suitable to accommodate overnight camping and the number of interactive programmes planned during the rally. The rally here has been dubbed "Democracy Fest". However, due to mixed signals by the police, Bersih Sabah has announced that they will not be announcing the venue of rally in Kota Kinabalu due to police actions in previous rallies. The police has also released a statement that the Bersih rally at Tanjung Lipat will not be allowed to go ahead, reasoning that City Hall has not given Bersih permission to hold the rally there.

=== Rest of the world ===
The group Global Bersih, based in Geneva representing the Malaysian diaspora around the world will be organising solidarity events in 50 cities around the world in support of the Bersih 4 rallies in Malaysia. Global Bersih has reported threats and intimidation against would-be participants around the world, including reports of Malaysian scholarship students abroad receiving threats of their scholarships being revoked if they participated in solidarity rallies.

== Rally incidents ==
=== Kuala Lumpur ===
Hundreds of rally-goers began assembling at the four gathering points in the city several hours ahead of the start of the rally at 2pm on the first day. It was estimated there were 250,000 participants who attended the rally in Kuala Lumpur on the first day, while at the low end the police estimate the crowd was 25,000. Unlike the previous rallies, the police did not mobilise the Federal Reserve Unit or use water cannons and tear gas on the protesters, but placed them on standby. After various events on the first day which included speeches and exercise activities, hundreds of participants began bedding down for the night in tents and sleeping mats in areas around the vicinity of Dataran Merdeka.

It was reported that unknown individuals had given out suspect packet drinks to participants causing 16 of the rally goers to suffer food poisoning. Bersih has said this was an act of sabotage, with the discovery of needle holes in the packet drinks.

=== Sabah and Sarawak ===
In Kuching, thousands of rally goers began assembling at several points of the city before making their way to the Tanjung Lipat waterfront: Song Kheng Hai rugby field, Sabah Trade Centre, Hakka Association Hall and City mosque and Plaza Juta. Many of participants began listening to speeches and poetry recitals before preparing barbecue sets, mattresses and tents for the overnight stay at Song Kheng Hai field.

In Kota Kinabalu, thousands of Bersih supporters showed up at the Taman Teluk Likas II park where they began to organise activities and events. Many supporters stayed overnight at the park, in preparation for the main event the next day which was the 'walk for democracy', whereby participants would converge on Kota Kinabalu city centre. However, due to police cordoning and putting up barricades in many spots around the city, the participants had to end their rally early on the second day after trying to make detours.

=== Rest of the world ===
Thousands of rally-goers have been seen gathering in more than 70 cities around the globe in solidarity with the Bersih rallies in Kuala Lumpur, Kota Kinabalu and Kuching. The rallies have taken place in the following cities:

- Amman, Jordan
- Abu Dhabi, United Arab Emirates
- Adelaide, Australia
- Atlanta, USA
- Auckland, New Zealand
- Bangkok, Thailand
- Bali, Indonesia
- Beijing, China
- Berlin, Germany
- Boise, Idaho, USA
- Bogotá, Colombia
- Brisbane, Australia
- Busan, South Korea
- Calgary, Canada
- Canberra, Australia
- Chiang Mai, Thailand
- Chicago, USA
- Christchurch, New Zealand
- Columbus, Ohio, USA
- Denver, USA
- Dili, East Timor
- Dublin, Ireland
- Dubai, United Arab Emirates
- Edinburgh, United Kingdom
- Edmonton, Canada
- Geneva, Switzerland
- Hamburg, Germany
- Helsinki, Finland
- Ho Chi Minh City, Vietnam
- Hong Kong, China
- Houston, USA
- Jakarta, Indonesia
- Cologne, Germany
- Kunming, China
- London, United Kingdom
- Los Angeles, USA
- Manhattan, Kansas, USA
- Manila, Philippines
- Melbourne, Australia
- Minneapolis, USA
- Montreal, Canada
- Munich, Germany
- New Delhi, India
- New York City, USA
- Oslo, Norway
- Ottawa, Canada
- Papeete, French Polynesia
- Port Moresby, Papua New Guinea
- Paris, France
- Perth, Australia
- Phnom Penh, Cambodia
- Rio de Janeiro, Brazil
- San Diego, USA
- San Francisco, USA
- Seattle, USA
- Shanghai, China
- Shenzhen, China
- Stockholm, Sweden
- Sunshine Coast, Australia
- Suzhou, China
- Sydney, Australia
- Taipei, Taiwan
- The Hague, Netherlands
- Tokyo, Japan
- Toronto, Canada
- Ulaanbaatar, Mongolia
- Vancouver, Canada
- Victoria, Canada
- Washington, D.C., USA
- Wellington, New Zealand
- Wichita, Kansas, USA
- Winnipeg, Canada
- Yangon, Myanmar
- Zürich, Switzerland

The event at the Federation Square in Melbourne, Australia drew over 5,000 people in support of the rally.

=== Arrests ===
It was reported in a few separate incidents that 26 people were arrested wearing the Bersih 4 yellow T-shirts in Malacca and Nilai, Negri Sembilan, and also had their shirts confiscated.

== Aftermath ==
Bersih has mentioned they might hold a fifth Bersih rally if their demands are not met. Bersih has proposed that transitional government be set up to bring about core institutional reforms, such as clean up the electoral roll, look into the Malaysian Anti-Corruption Commission and to call for fresh elections within 12 to 18 months.

=== Counter rally ===
A counter rally was held by National Silat Federation (PESAKA) on 16 September (Malaysia Day) to support the premiership of Najib Razak. However the rally's motive has been questioned due to the fact that the rally goers are predominantly Malays and that it is racial in nature. The rally organiser, also an UMNO Supreme Council member, Annuar Musa has admitted that the rally was racist in nature and participants were paid to take part in the rally.
