= Federal Reserve Unit =

- Pasukan Simpanan Persekutuan
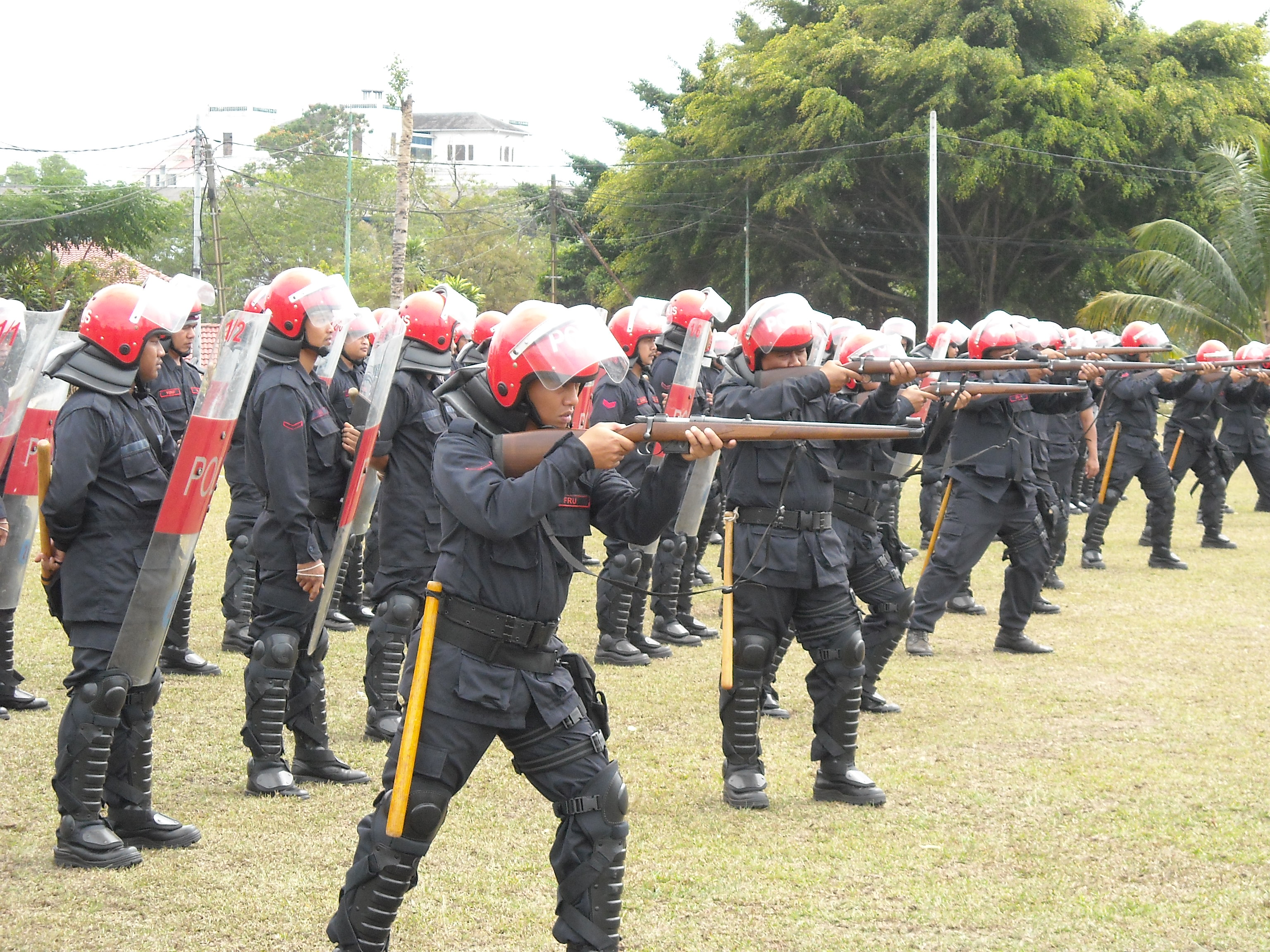
- FRU 3rd group arms with Czech-made CZ 527 bolt actions rifles without ammo during the anti-riot drill.
- Active: 5 December 1955; 69 years ago
- Country: Malaya (1955–1963); Malaysia (1963–present)
- Branch: Royal Malaysia Police
- Type: Paramilitary police
- Role: Riot control
- Size: 10 detachments
- Part of: Directly under control of the Royal Malaysia Police and the Ministry of Home Affairs
- Garrison/HQ: Main Police Headquarters, Bukit Aman, Kuala Lumpur
- Nickname(s): FRU
- Colour of Beret: Red beret
- Anniversaries: 25 March (Police Days Anniversaries); 31 August (Hari Merdeka)
- Engagements: 13 May Incident; Memali Incident; Operation Lalang; 2007 Bersih rally; Bersih 2.0 rally; Bersih 3.0 rally; 2015 Malay Dignity rally

Commanders
- Current commander: SAC Rosli bin Md Yusof

The Federal Reserve Unit (Malay: Pasukan Simpanan Persekutuan; PSP), or better known by the abbreviation as FRU, is a riot control force and a paramilitary special response team that can be deployed at any time to engage in any emergency or public unrest in Malaysia.

== History ==
The team was established on 5 December 1955. Starting with three troops, FRU has successfully overcome the problems of public order such as strikes and riots that happened in the early years of the 1950s. From 1990 onwards, FRU also played an important role in handling organised riot that have sparked from the arrest of Anwar Ibrahim. FRU also played role in controlling football riots.

== Roles ==
The main role of this unit is to disperse illegal assembly, riot suppression and to carry out other functions relating to Public Order. The unit is self-contained and capable, highly mobile and become Public Order Reserve Units. When this unit is not involved in Public Order duties, it can be assigned by the Commanding Officer to assist the Chief of Police, State police, Criminal Investigation Division and Special Branch in general or special tasks which include:

- Crime prevention as special patrol in addition to regular patrol unit / Patrol in the area of high crime frequency;
- Disaster relief (flood, fire, landslide, air crash and others), evacuation and large scale operation;
- Setting roadblocks and check points, media censorship, intensive patrol and others.
- Safeguarding VIP visitors, events, parades, assemblies and others.

As its role became more important, this team was augmented to 7 units, with a total membership in 2003 of 2,481 people. Beside that FRU has also a water cannon unit, horseback unit and training institution at Sungai Senam, Ipoh, Perak. In line with current needs and law claim, a woman special detachment have been spawned and this detachment is based in Jalan Semarak, Kuala Lumpur. It has since been moved to its own base located in Cheras.

FRU's performance is known globally. This was evident when the United Nations (U.N.) applied to PDRM to house a riot guard force under U.N. flags in Timor Leste. The team was assigned to control riot and tranquility in a country which just became independent.

== Organisations ==
Each FRU base has a wing headquarters composed of three troops, A, B and C. Each troop consists of two baton sections, an armed section (rifles, tear gas and grenades), and a guard vehicle section. Specific vocations within the unit include drivers, photographers, translators, marksmen, signal operators and diary recorders.

Apart from that this team also perform crime prevention to help remote district police chief efforts in reducing crime rates. By that FRU have pointed out success could not be disputed more when entrust to royal pennant parade in the line of honour guard duties.

Light Strike Force (LSF)

Deployed in advance from the main FRU unit, this unit is armed with riot shields and helmets. It is designed and trained to handle small crowds. If the crowd gets larger and uncontrollable, the FRU will be called in to assist.

Public Order and Riot Unit (PORU)

Its members are taken from RMP General Operations Force (Malay: Pasukan Gerakan Am; PGA), it is deployed in states or regions which do not have any FRU bases.

K9 Unit

On 14 August 2023, it was revealed that the FRU has been approved to acquire 10 riot dogs in early 2024 for purposes of anti-riot, crowd control, and preserving public order. It's also suggested the K9 Unit may be used for bomb threat and hostage crisis. However, it is unclear whether this plan has been materialised as of September 2025.

== Delegation ==
Certain FRU divisions are under the command of the inspector-general of police (IGP) and require prior approval from the IGP to be deployed.

== Bases ==
The Federal Reserve Unit bases are located in densely populated areas in the country.

- FRU No. 1 - Kuala Lumpur
- FRU No. 2 - Johor Bahru, Johor
- FRU No. 3 - Pulau Pinang
- FRU No. 4 - Kuala Lumpur
- FRU No. 5 - Ipoh, Perak
- FRU No. 6 - Kuala Terengganu, Terengganu
- FRU No. 7 - Seremban, Negeri Sembilan
- Women's Detachment - Kuala Lumpur
- Mounted Unit - Kuala Lumpur
- FRU Training Centre - Ipoh, Perak

== Past operations ==
- Event 13 May 1969 - Deployed during the racial riots of 13 May incident to control the situation.
- 19 November 1985 - Involved in the arrest of Ibrahim Libya in the Memali Incident in Baling, Kedah.
- 27 October 1987 - Involved in Operation Lalang which resulted in the arrest of 106 people under the Internal Security Act including the opposition leader and DAP Secretary-General Lim Kit Siang, ALIRAN President Chandra Muzaffar, DAP Deputy Chairman Karpal Singh, and others.
- 1998 - Deployed to suppress the resulting street demonstrations after Anwar Ibrahim, former Deputy Prime Minister of Malaysia was put into jail for alleged corruption and homosexual practices.
- 10 November 2007 - FRU were deployed for suppressing the 2007 Bersih Rally held in Kuala Lumpur. As a result, 245 people were arrested and released the night later.
- 25 November 2007 - Deployed to disperse the Hindu Rights Action Force (HINDRAF) demonstration held in the capital of Malaysia, Kuala Lumpur.
- 2008 - Joint together with Malaysian Armed Forces and civil agencies to securing the incidents of Bukit Antarabangsa landslide.
- 6 February 2009 - FRU deployed in Kuala Kangsar, Perak during the Ubudiah Mosque riots involving 5000 people.
- 2011 - FRU were deployed to stop a DAP gathering at Stutong market in Kuching during the 10th Sarawak State Election. The attempt failed after negotiations with DAP candidates. However, FRU were later spotted at Miri's Indoor stadium controlling the crowd as the election results were announced. Nevertheless, the night ended peacefully.
- 9 July 2011 - FRU deployed in capital Kuala Lumpur to suppress Bersih 2.0 rally.
- 28 April 2012 - FRU deployed in capital Kuala Lumpur to suppress Bersih 3.0 rally.
- 5 May 2012 - FRU assisted in crowd control operations during Wesak Day procession in Kuala Lumpur.
- 17 May 2015 - FRU deployed at Gong Badang Stadium in Kuala Nerus, Terengganu to resolve the after-match riot due to dissastifaction of Terengganu's fans towards the semi-final match of 2015 Malaysia FA Cup between Terengganu and LionsXII.
- 16 September 2015 - FRU deployed in Kuala Lumpur to suppress the "Red Shirt" demonstration, which is a counter-protest against Bersih 4 rally and to show support for Prime Minister Najib Razak on Malaysia Day.
- 28 Aug 2017 - FRU deployed during ticket sales at Shah Alam Stadium for the 2017 Southeast Asian Games men's football final. FRU dispersed the crowd and later assisted in crowd control.
- 9 May 2018 - FRU team members were mobilised outside a results centre in Ayer Hitam, Johor on evening during the day of Malaysian general election, 2018 resulting scuffles between the crowds and the police.
- 26–27 November 2018 - FRU deployed during the two-days riot incident in Subang Jaya, Selangor regarding the relocation of Sri Maha Mariamman Temple to control the heated situation involving two groups.
- 9 December 2018 - The FRU team arrived at Bukit Jalil National Stadium to control the increasingly tensed situation at the ticket counters during the ticket sales of the final match of 2018 AFF Championship between Malaysia and Vietnam.
- 18 December 2018 - FRU tightened the security of Sri Maha Mariammman Temple at USJ 25 and One City Development complex in Subang Jaya several hours after the death of Muhammad Adib Mohd Kassim, a firefighter who died as a result of injuries sustained during a riot at the temple to avoid any racial provocations.
- 2 August 2021 - FRU blocked opposition MPs from entering Parliament during the 2020–21 Malaysian political crisis.
- 5 November 2022 - FRU fired tear gas on some 300 KDM supporters who attempted to storm the nomination centre in Tenom after KDM candidate Peter Anthony's nomination in the 15th General Election was rejected due to his past court conviction.

== Album ==
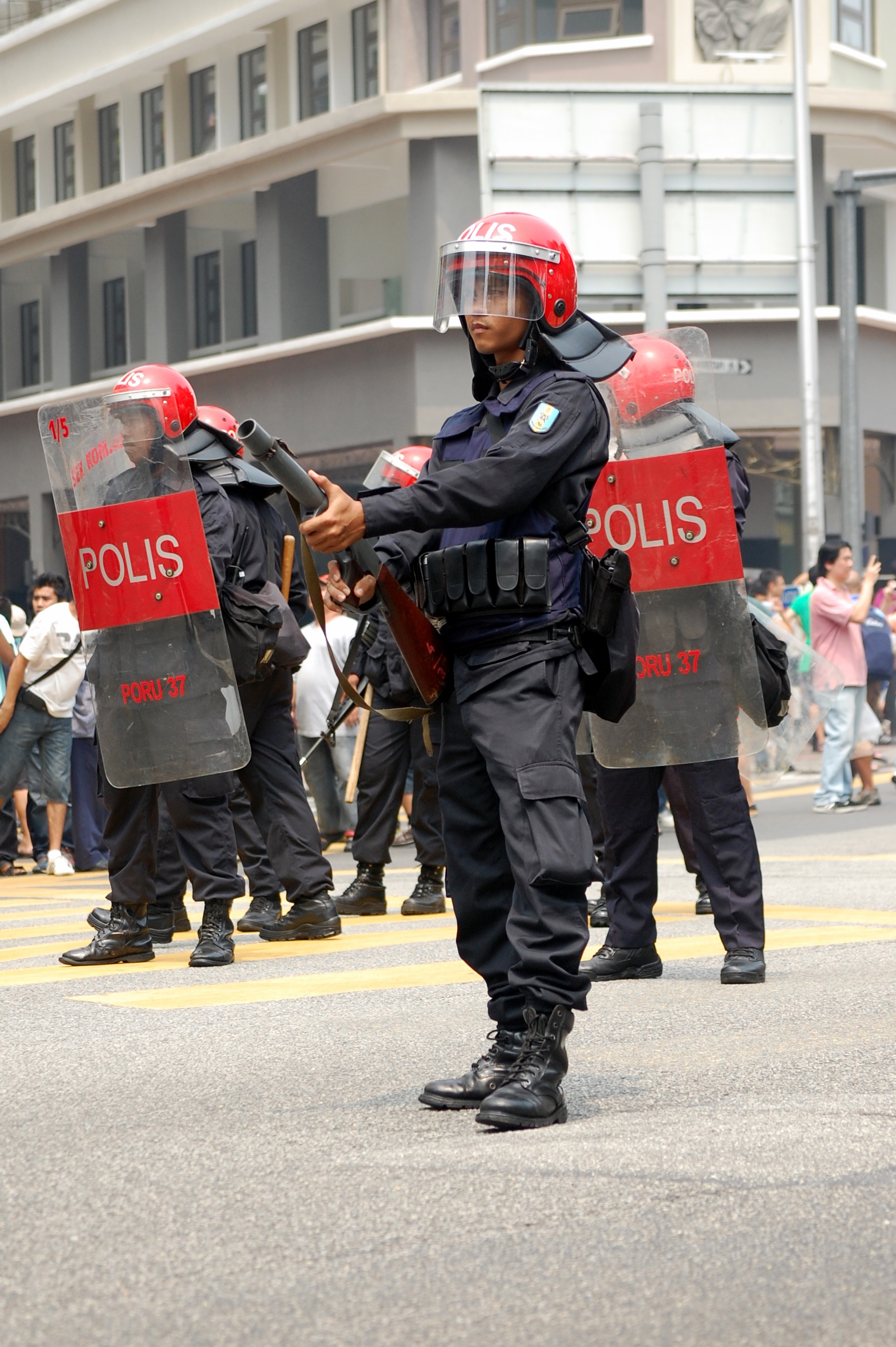
A member of the Malaysia's Federal Reserve Unit prepares to disperse protesters during the Bersih Rally 2.0.

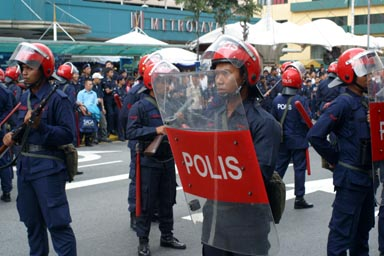
FRU members during the parade.

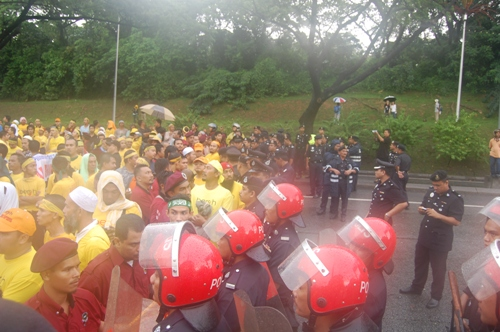
The police form a human line near the National Palace.

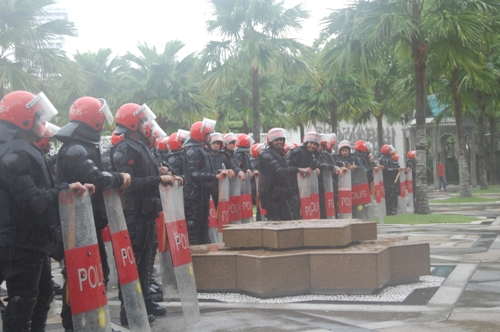
The riot police units were placed at various places around Kuala Lumpur. A unit was on active duty at the Masjid Negara.

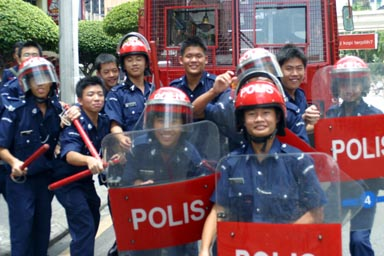
Member of National Police Cadet are styling FRU gear.

== See also ==
- Riot police
