= 2007 Bersih rally =

Anti-corruption protest in Kuala Lumpur, Malaysia

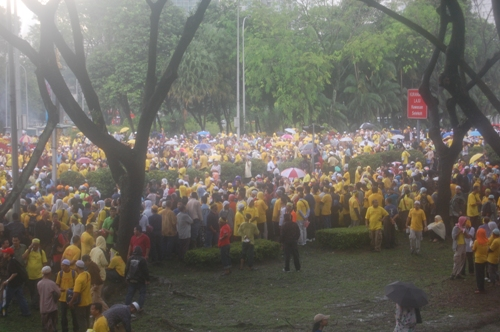
Rallying crowd in front of the Istana Negara

The 2007 Bersih rally was a rally held in Kuala Lumpur, Malaysia, on 10 November 2007. The aim of this walk was to campaign for electoral reform. It was precipitated by allegations of corruption and discrepancies in the Malaysian election system that heavily favour the ruling political party, Barisan Nasional, which had been in power since Malaysia achieved its independence in 1957.

Much of the publicity for the rally was distributed through online media and blogs. Initially, the organisers planned to have a gathering point at Dataran Merdeka square. However, it was later revealed that this was a red herring to distract the police. The locations of the four gathering points were only released the day before the protests by word of mouth, mobile phones and emails.

Consequently, the rally began with gatherings of people at four locations: Sogo department store, Masjid India, Masjid Negara and Pasar Seni. These four groups of people combined into a single group on their march towards the palace gates to hand over a memorandum to the King demanding electoral reform. Early estimates put the number of attendees between 10,000 and 40,000. Plans called for 100,000 people to join in the rally, and there are claims that this number was indeed achieved, as the many early estimates failed to include those who simultaneously gathered at different locations and those that were barred by police from continuing the walk. The title of the rally is derived from the name of the organizers, BERSIH (Coalition for Clean and Fair Elections). The word "bersih" means clean in Malay.

Before the Bersih rally, there was a Reformasi Movement in September 1998 caused by the sacking of previous deputy prime minister, Anwar Ibrahim. It had formed a noteworthy change in the political scene in Malaysia. Supporters from all over went down to the lanes to show the call for Reformasi, which was driven by Anwar Ibrahim. Large and exceptional demonstrations occurred in Kuala Lumpur and other major cities. In the meantime, the administration of Malaysia is currently grasping the universe of Information Technology. The Multimedia Super Corridor (MSC) denoted a fresh start for Malaysia, as it looks to be a world leader in Information Technology.

Next is The Political Tsunami Changes Malaysian Politics. This is a political wave. Much the same as the normal tidal wave that never gives any sign it happens. In any case, when the topographical plate unexpectedly shifted form and vertically uproot the overlying water, it can create an awesome tsunami. During this time, the political torrent cleared away 50% of the Barisan Nasional (BN) coalition's energy. Nobody expected such outcomes, included BN and the resistance as there was no obvious sign before the decisions. Without a doubt, BN has been mentally arranged. It anticipated that would lose dominant part of Indian votes and part of Chinese votes. In any case, it was sure to win the national surveys by acquiring the majority of Malay votes and backings from Sabah and Sarawak. In view of this certainty, it held an early race. Therefore, the individuals who have been required to lose lost severely while the individuals who were not anticipated that would lose, lost a great deal. BN did not only lose Indian and Chinese vote but rather Malay votes in urban regions, and additionally in Northern Malaysia and the East Coast. This is not quite the same as the influential current in 1990 and 1999. Resistance parties framed a coalition to battle with BN coalition in 1990. In the long run, Malay voters stressed that progressions may cause them lose the decision control. In this way, they surrendered Tengku Razaleigh Hamzah and upheld United Malays National Organization. In spite of most Chinese voted in favor of the resistance, yet the restriction fizzled without the help from others.

== Bersih demands ==
The demands made by Bersih were:

- Usage of indelible ink (which has already been agreed to by the Electoral Commission, but later scrapped)
- Clean-up of registered voters roll
- Abolition of postal votes
- Access to the government-controlled print and broadcast media for opposition parties

== Reformasi demands ==
These demands were incorporated into the Memorandum for submission to the Yang di-Pertuan Agong.Reformasi shakes Mahathir's authoritarian regime was political onlookers' fundamental concern. From a historical point of view voters' decision could realize a two-party system and end BN's overwhelming one-party dominion. This was the expectation of majority rule government followers. This awesome coalition planned to take over one third of the seats in parliament, end the matchless quality of the BN and constrain Mahathir to venture down.

== Preparations ==
=== Organisers' preparations ===
Initially, organisers decided on two locations for rally participants to gather before marching on to the Istana Negara: Masjid Negara and Dataran Merdeka, two of the most significant landmarks in Kuala Lumpur. However, the day before the rallies were due, the organisers decided to change the locations to Sogo department store, Masjid India, Masjid Negara and Pasar Seni, in an attempt to divert riot police's attention. Furthermore, a decoy of 500 people were sent to Dataran Merdeka to 'attempt' to get into the square.

=== Government preparations ===
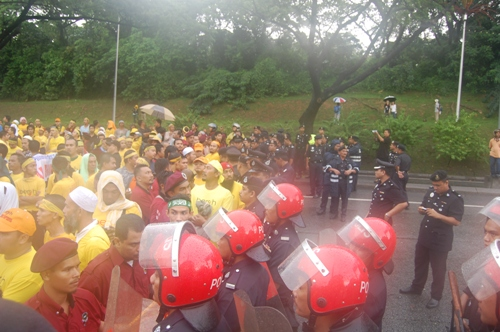
The police form a human line near the National Palace.

In the days leading up to the rally, the government warned Malaysians not to take part in the rally as an official permit had not been granted. Citizens were warned that anyone who turned up and participate in the rally would be immediately arrested, because the rally is deemed as illegal since the current Malaysian law bans public gatherings of more than five persons without a permit. However, in July last year, a police permit has released for Umno Youth to hold a protest to demand that the US and Israel end the violence in the Middle East, while US Secretary of State Condoleezza Rice was in Kuala Lumpur for a meeting with Asean leaders.

Local television channels, controlled by the ruling party, continually showed video footage of violent protests from other countries, complemented by the tagline "Demonstration always ends in violence." The Prime Minister of Malaysia, Abdullah Badawi, was quoted saying "Saya pantang dicabar" (translation: I will not be challenged). He urged Malaysians to use elections to give their feedback. He had vowed to crack down on the rally and gave his permission to the police to break up the rally and possibly arrest its participants.

== Responses ==
=== Police's response ===
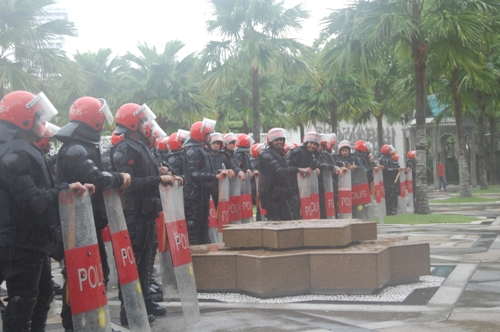
The riot police units were placed at various places around Kuala Lumpur. A unit was on active duty at the Masjid Negara.

Hours before the rally was due to occur, thousands of police were stationed around Merdeka Square, and traffic coming into Kuala Lumpur had to pass through numerous security checkpoints, some saying checkpoints began at Pagoh, Johor and Kemaman, Terrengganu. This created widespread traffic congestion throughout the entire Klang Valley area. Although it was claimed by the government that the actual rally was the cause of the jam, other sources contradicted this, stating that the numerous barricades and roadblocks set up by police officers were the direct source of the congestion.

Authorities also made changes to the train schedule in an attempt to make it more difficult for people to reach the rally area. Trains on the Kelana Jaya LRT line coming into the city from Kelana Jaya, which normally stop at Pasar Seni and Masjid Jamek, instead bypassed those stations, going from KL Sentral directly to Dang Wangi Station. Passengers were not given any warning of this and many did not realise they would not be able to stop at these stations until the train was already on its way to Dang Wangi or Sentral.

During the rally, the police responded by firing chemical laced water cannons and tear gas at rally participants at the Masjid Jamek and Bandaraya LRT meeting points. 245 people were arrested according to the local daily newspapers The Star, owned by MCA, one of the coalition parties of the current ruling government. Independent sources, however, quoted only 34 people were arrested and released the night later.

Purportedly, the organisers of BERSIH had ordered participants to be cooperative and the assembly was to remain peaceful at all times.

=== Media's response ===
Foreign media such as Al-Jazeera covered the event with detailed videos and ground and satellite images. BBC and CNN featured the news in their online papers as well. Bangkok Post published this event on its internet edition and fine print.

The event received almost no coverage in the local media. The most widely circulated English daily, The Star only reported a traffic congestion. Other print dailies did not report the incident.

=== Government responses ===
==== Prime minister ====
Prime Minister Abdullah Ahmad Badawi remarked that the Malaysian Royalty should not be dragged into Malaysian politics. He further alleged that the rally constituted an attempt by the Opposition to drag the Yang di-Pertuan Agong into the issue. Constitutionally, the Yang di-Pertuan Agong is the Head of the State while the Prime Minister is the Head of Government. Earlier, BERSIH had informed the public that the rally is a non-partisan activity, agreed by all organisers with NGOs (non-governmental organisations) forming the principal backbone of the movement, followed by some opposition parties.

BERSIH had earlier insisted the rally was non-partisan; however, no parties from the ruling Barisan Nasional coalition participated. In fact, there was a cry for a clampdown on the rally by delegates and hard-liners in the 2007 UMNO Annual General Meeting.

==== Information Minister ====
Later, Information Minister Datuk Seri Zainuddin Maidin criticised Al-Jazeera, denying reports that the police used excessive force in the demonstration. Zainuddin said that the police had to disperse the gathering with water cannons and tear gas since the rally was illegal. There are online allegations that certain journalists and civilians were beaten by authorities. Mainstream media confirmed arrests of people who had joined the rally. Most Malaysian media outlets generally gave the number of protesters present as approximately 4,000, although independent and international media reported a turnout ten times higher. Zainuddin Maidin was severely criticised in various socio-political blogs for his poor command of English shown during an interview with the Qatar-based news group Al-Jazeera regarding the rally.

Later the people marched towards Istana Negara to hand over the memorandum after many attempts (from the police) to disperse the mob failed. Some had travelled from other states to claim their rights.

==== Minister in the Prime Minister's Department ====
Nazri Aziz, from the ruling party UMNO gave a negative response. He claimed there is democracy in Malaysia, therefore there is no necessity for a rally.

Nazri further predicted that the opposition parties "are going to lose, and they are going to lose badly in the next elections". He also insisted that Malaysia was a democracy, thus invalidating comparisons with Myanmar because the Buddhist monks in Myanmar were protesting for the restoration of democracy in a country where the people were oppressed.

However, Nazri did not admit that protest is allowed in democracies. BERSIH demands, with support from citizens for the restoration of genuine democracy. Unclean elections due to unfair electoral processes is equivalent to false or absent democracy.

Moreover, both Myanmar and Malaysia crack down on rallies and protests not permitted by the government. Human Rights associations across the world regard freedom to assemble and rally as fundamental rights of a citizen in democratic nations.

=== Royals' response ===
According to Malaysiakini, Yang di-Pertuan Agong Tuanku Mizan Zainal Abdidin in a rare press statement said neither he nor Istana Negara had directly or indirectly supported the massive rally held over the weekend in Kuala Lumpur.

According to Bernama, the King, in a statement issued via a palace official, expressed regret over the claim that he and the palace had supported Saturday’s illegal gathering.

=== International response ===
On 29 November 2007, the AFP carried a comment by an anonymous official from the United States State Department stating that "We believe citizens of any country should be allowed to peacefully assemble and express their views."

== Rally proceedings ==
It was reported that the rally participants played a 'cat and mouse' game with the riot police, as many of the groups were repeatedly stopped by the police and disallowed from continuing.

The group from Masjid Jamek were sprayed with water cannons and tear gas canisters, but still managed to continue their march by joining the group congregating in front of the Sogo departmental store.

The group from Pasar Seni, led by Tian Chua attempted to pass through police barricades that blocked them from approaching the palace. This group also tried to negotiate with the police. As the negotiations were going on, this group found an alley that was not guarded by riot police, hence being able to bypass the police to get to the palace.

500 people from the Pasar Seni group joined part of the Sogo group to continue their march. Meanwhile, 10,000 people from Masjid Negara had begun marching to Istana Negara. They split into two groups to increase the chance of reaching Istana Negara.

A combined group of 40,000 people, stretching half a kilometre long along the highway were stopped by police 300 meters from the palace grounds. They were eventually joined by the group from Masjid Jamek and Sogo.

Police allowed a delegation of 7 people, including PAS's President Abdul Hadi Awang and Nasharuddin Mat Isa, DAP’s Lim Kit Siang and Lim Guan Eng and Keadilan's Datuk Seri Anwar Ibrahim to enter the palace.

After the memorandum was handed over to a palace secretary, most of the rally participants were seen walking back to Masjid Negara. About 20 people had been arrested earlier in the day and were held at Pudu police station. When they finally arrived at Masjid Negara, they were told to go home. Some of the rally participants went to the Pudu police station to support those who were detained.

== The political tsunami changes in Malaysian politics ==
For 2008, voters never again settled on choice based on race and shading. Resistance votes in urban zones, blended bodies electorate that cast by Chinese, Indians and Malays helped the opposition to pick up triumph. The reasons are, first is changes in the social environment. Regarding social condition BN has been confronting the antagonistic social atmosphere before the elections. Financially, the surge of costs has shaped an awesome weight to the citizens, particularly the individuals who live in urban communities.

Seconds is changes in civic thought. The political structure of BN coalition was as yet in view of race in which each gathering worried without anyone else racial belief system to gain support from their racial gatherings. At that point, pioneers of each gatherings collaborated and circulated control in the best administration. This structure has been kept up for half of a century and assumed its chronicled part, and also effectively settled some racial issues. In any case, there were a few shortcomings for the structure. As each gathering was battling for the interests of their races, it was absence of regular standards and objectives and prompted logical inconsistencies in strategies and goals. Segment parties at first made due on such conveyance of energy yet as time advances, bigotry has been bit by bit obsolete and the general national intrigue has gone past racial interests.

There are confinements for racial gatherings and it is difficult to keep up the need of national solidarity. Under these twofold weights, the topic of the BN's statement that still worried on peace, dependability and flourishing has been conflicting with the prerequisites of the general population. Like the riptide underneath the ocean, BN coalition, who has ruled the nation for half of a century couldn't control the change of the general population's idea. Generally, the restriction was bolstered by the general population as it accentuated on issues like bringing down oil costs, enhancing lawfulness, lessening the hole between the rich and poor people and battling against debasement which were in accordance with the social environment and steady with the general population's desires. The belief system of the restriction has deserted racial and religious issues however yelled for change and underlined on social equity, vote based system and equity.

Democratic Action Party's (DAP) wish to convey changes to the nation, Parti Keadilan Rakyat's (PKR) support of Divide and Rule and Parti Islam Se-Malaysia's (PAS) thought of having a welfare nation picked up them reverberation from the general population. The restriction cooperated and angled votes in favor of each other to reinforce their energy. Furthermore, PKR has exited from the shadow of Anwar while Anwar demonstrated his charm that effectively transformed the gathering into an ordinary political gathering and another constrain. Malaysia would have another face after the political tidal wave. The energy of BN coalition has declined and it needs to depend on Sabah, Sarawak and Southern Malaysia to keep up its decision control. There will be real authority changes in UMNO, MCA, MIC and Gerakan. What's more, the belief systems of BN coalition's segment parties must be balanced. Relinquishing racial segment would be an exit plan. With respect to the resistance, they won't not have the capacity to deal with to sudden triumph in the decisions, particularly for DAP and Keadilan who won control of states and extended their impacts in the Parliament ought to.

== Impact of Reformasi ==
The ascent of the Reformasi development in the late 1990s was a noteworthy point of reference in the democratization procedure in Malaysia. Amid the period before the Reformasi development, exceptional monetary development rendered a feeling of authenticity to the tyrant run; in any case, the budgetary emergency in 1997 opened the way to the introduction of the Reformasi development. Nair (2007) portrayed the Reformasi development as a reaction from the general population to the tyrant govern of the decision administration. They requested government straightforwardness, responsibility and trustworthiness. In spite of the fact that the development secured an extensive variety of issues and causes, it was fixated on the manhandle of energy by the administration. The Reformasi development prompted political changes in Malaysia, especially with respect to the dispositions of government officials. This study concentrates on political changes regarding casual political changes, for example, changes in political talks, and changes in the political procedures of the decision administration. Formal political changes, for example, the democratization of organized political framework, are yet to have critical effect on social developments, in spite of the fact that measures are presently being taken, for example, the abolishment of the Internal Security Act (ISA), beginning on 16 September 2011, and the foundation of an extraordinary board of trustees on appointive change.

The Reformasi development began after an uncommon droop in monetary development. All of the country's organizations crumpled, including those claimed by the child of the fourth Prime Minister, Dr. Mahathir Mohamad. Amid the emergency, Mahathir trained Anwar Ibrahim, the Deputy Prime Minister who held the post as the Finance Minister, to salvage the organizations possessed by Mahathir's friends. Anwar declined to take after Mahathir's directions with respect to the utilization of open assets and firmly proposed that it was essential for the administration to get subsidizing from the International Monetary Fund (IMF) to manage its economy. Mahathir was against this arrangement and guaranteed that accepting assets from the IMF would additionally reinforce the intercession of worldwide associations and undermine Malaysia's power.

The Reformasi development was an essential driving force for the democratization procedure in Malaysia. Before the development, the restriction parties were feeble, divided and withered due to wide contrasts in the philosophies of the two greatest resistance parties, Parti Islam Se-Malaysia (PAS or Pan-Malaysian Islamic Party) and Parti Tindakan Demokratik (DAP or Democratic Action Party). While PAS required an Islamic state, DAP was a liberal-mainstream party battling for a Malaysian Malaysia; this made it troublesome for the two parties to coordinate.

The development inevitably changed into its own political gathering and partnership, prompting the foundation of both the Parti Keadilan Nasional (PKN or National Justice Party) and the Barisan Alternatif (BA or Alternative Front). Together with PAS and DAP, they concurred on a liberal motivation to restrict the Barisan Nasional (BN or National Front) in the 1999 general decision. Their pronouncement focused on multi-racial and human rights issues, the destruction of destitution and the battle against government defilement and mishandle of energy. In the decisions, they effectively diminished the quantity of seats held by the decision party, yet at the same time couldn't overwhelm its two-thirds larger part. The coalition effectively won 45 situates in the parliamentary race, which was somewhat higher than the past decision, while the administration won 148 seats, exhibiting a lessening from the past race. BA likewise won 40.21% of the aggregate vote (Ufen, 2009).

The Reformasi development is itself a piece of the democratization procedure, going about as an impetus for its dynamic advancement. The development turned into an essential factor in deciding the voting result of the following two general races. To comprehend the democratization procedure in Malaysia, accordingly, it is pivotal to comprehend the route in which the ensuing two general decisions influenced the political structure and in this manner gave the political chance to social developments to create.

== Chinese tsunami impacts ==
"A Chinese tsunami" was the means by which the result of the distinctly challenged Thirteenth General Elections (GE13) came to be portrayed by Najib Razak and other Barisan Nasional (BN) pioneers on the night of 5 May 2013 (Tan, 2013). The symbolism was a solid articulation of frustration by BN pioneers of how the absence of Chinese help had prompted lost seats by the decision coalition. In the quick consequence of GE13, a few spectators fight that the outcomes have exacerbated the ethnic partition in the nation. In displaying the GE13 comes about as a Chinese tidal wave there has been a reaction from specific groups inside UMNO against the non-Malays (Muzaffar, 2013). Explanations and editorials leaving the genius UMNO media depicted the Chinese votes in favor of the resistance as a selling out.

Some guaranteed that the Chinese, not being content with control of the economy are resolved to seizing political power. They cautioned of Malay striking back and proposed that those not content with BN move somewhere else. Such calls were first made by Ahmad Zahid Hamidi because of mass revives sorted out by PR to challenge the decision comes about under the flag of "Dark 505". Still others required a blacklist of Chinese organizations that had upheld the resistance. Inside UMNO there is a commotion for harder and that's only the tip of the iceberg tyrant reaction to commentators of the legislature and the restriction. To be sure, captures were made not long after GE13 against those arranging energizes and challenge social occasions. Rafizi Ramli, the PKR procedure executive who had conveyed to open consideration the National Feedlot Center (NFC) outrage was charged under the Keeping Money and Financial Institutions Act for uncovering data identified with the NFC. Government commentators considered this to be an endeavor to threaten those trying to uncover wrongdoings in government. In the interim, duplicates of three resistance daily papers were seized for abusing the Printing Presses and Publications Act.

A few months after the fact, another week by week The Heat was suspended, evidently for its front-page story on the lavish way of life of the Prime Minister and his significant other (The Malaysian Insider, 2013a). The UMNO initiative, understanding that it was Malay help particularly those in the rustic zones that hosted encouraged the get-together to survive GE13 quickly moved to give more consideration and monetary prizes to this voting demographic. On 14 September 2013, Najib Razak reported the development of the Bumiputera Monetary Empowerment Council. The committee would present new measures. Furthermore, procedures to monetarily engage the Bumiputera (New Straits Times, 2013a). Focuses towards the board's destinations would be set for all boss official officers of government-connected organizations (GLCs). To upgrade Bumiputera value possession in the corporate segment, the Skim Amanah Saham Bumiputera 2 would be propelled by Permodalan Nasional Bhd with 10 billion units. Shahrir Abdul Samad, an UMNO veteran pioneer and MP for Johor Bahru, took a more extensive view in his evaluation of why non-Malays voted in favor of the resistance. He recognized that the rule of balance upheld by the DAP was a factor that drew numerous non-Malay votes in favor of PR. Not exclusively are non-Malays looking for break even with circumstances and get to, Shahrir trusted that non-Malays are focused on protecting Malaysia as a mainstream state. On the off chance that BN would like to recover bolster in GE14, Shahrir held that there must be better administration under UMNO and BN (The Malaysian Insider, 2013b; Free Malaysia Today, 2013a).

At long last, the youthful Chinese are today more worried about more extensive issues that go past mutual interests. Break even with circumstances in instruction, work and business are issues that are as yet essential to them. Be that as it may, the youthful Chinese set these inside the bigger national structure of between ethnic collaboration, equity and human rights, and defending of nature (Lee, 2011). Thus numerous youthful Chinese experts are attracted to NGOs and common society developments. Also, in the event that they take part in legislative issues they join multi-ethnic parties. Moreover, a few supporters of PR battle that the three gatherings of DAP, PKR and PAS offer a superior similarity of political equality and that each heads a Pakatan-drove government in Pulau Pinang, Selangor and Kelantan.

== See also ==
- 2007 HINDRAF rally, a similarly large gathering in Kuala Lumpur occurring two weeks after the Bersih rally.
- 2011 Bersih 2.0 rally
- 2012 Bersih 3.0 rally
- 2015 Bersih 4 rally
