= Bersih 2.0 rally =

2011 demonstration against electoral fraud and corruption in Kuala Lumpur, Malaysia

- Bersih 2.0 logo
- Date: 9 July 2011
- Location: Kuala Lumpur, Malaysia
- Goals: To call for free and fair elections in Malaysia.
- Status: Concluded

Parties
Bersih; Pakatan Rakyat	United Malays National Organisation (UMNO) Youth Wing

Lead figures
Ambiga Sreenevasan; A. Samad Said	

Number
10,000 to over 20,000 (50,000 claimed by Bersih, 6,000 claimed by police)	500

Casualties and losses
1 death (Heart attack)	

The Bersih 2.0 rally (also called the Walk for Democracy) was a demonstration in Kuala Lumpur held on 9 July 2011 as a follow-up to the 2007 Bersih rally. The rally, organised by the Coalition for Clean and Fair Elections (Bersih), was supported by Pakatan Rakyat, the coalition of the three largest opposition parties in Malaysia, but was deemed illegal by the government. Bersih, chaired by former president of the Bar Council Ambiga Sreenevasan, were pushing the Election Commission of Malaysia (EC) to ensure free and fair elections in Malaysia. It demanded that the EC clean up the electoral roll, reform postal voting, use indelible ink, introduce a minimum 21-day campaign period, allow all parties free access to the media, and put an end to electoral fraud.

The police vowed to stop any rallies from taking place on the planned date on the grounds that all public gatherings without police permits are illegal. Having originally planned to march through the streets of Kuala Lumpur, Bersih decided to hold its rally at Merdeka Stadium after consultations with the Yang di-Pertuan Agong, Malaysia's head of state.

Supporters of Bersih claim that demands for electoral reform made during the 2007 demonstration fell on deaf ears. UMNO Youth and Perkasa planned counter-rallies, dismissing Bersih's demands for electoral reform, but Perkasa called off its counter-rally due to its inability to secure a venue and permit.

Estimates of the turnout ranged between 10,000 and over 20,000. The protesters were unable to congregate at Merdeka Stadium as many were forced to disperse by police who were heavily deployed throughout the city. Police arrested more than 1600 protesters, including Ambiga and several opposition figures.

== Background ==
The ruling coalition in Malaysia, Barisan Nasional (BN), which consists of parties representing the major racial groups in Malaysia, has won every federal election since independence in 1957. Opposition parties and civil society organisations have long claimed that BN has been manipulating elections in its favour.

Pan-Malaysian Islamic Party (PAS) deputy president Mohamad Sabu said there were many "concerns" about how the next general election will be conducted. He accused BN of cheating tactics, including registering foreign nationals as BN voters. PAS information chief Tuan Ibrahim Tuan Man said the EC and the National Registration Department (NRD) "were committing abuses," and that there were "rampant media abuses." Democratic Action Party (DAP) member of parliament Teresa Kok accused BN of "gerrymandering" and "malapportioning" electoral constituencies. She also pointed out how the opposition parties' share of seats in parliament was a lot less than their share of the popular vote. Leader of the Opposition Anwar Ibrahim claimed that BN would lose power if elections were free and fair.

Civil society organisation Aliran claimed that there are "severe restrictions on political freedom" on opposition politicians in Malaysia. It highlighted structural problems such as access to the media, short notices of election dates, and short campaign periods. Human rights group SUARAM also claim abuses by the ruling party such as gerrymandering constituencies, using public funds for projects to win political support, and the "unscrutinised" counting of postal ballots. Transparency International's Malaysian branch, criticising both BN and opposition parties, spoke out against financial rewards promised by political parties to voters while campaigning, calling the practice "vote buying" and "corrupt."

Both the Election Commission and BN have denied allegations of abuse.

=== Protests in Malaysia ===
Street demonstrations are rare in Malaysia, but the public has become more vocal with the rise of alternative media and a resurgent opposition. Gatherings in Malaysia of five or more people must receive a police permit, which is rarely granted. The government has used heavy police presence to block rallies as well as arrest protest leaders to stop illegal public protests. Former prime minister Abdullah Ahmad Badawi said he was willing to sacrifice public freedoms in the interest of national stability. Four rallies in 2007 ended with arrests made by police. A protest in 2009 against the Internal Security Act was also broken up by tear gas and water cannons.

=== Bersih ===
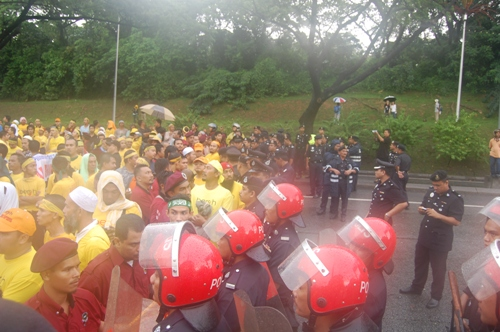
A scene from the 2007 rally. Protesters on the left are dressed in yellow. They are met by the Federal Reserve Unit, the riot police (in red helmets). Standing in between the protesters and the riot police are PAS's Jabatan Amal volunteer unit (dressed in maroon).

Bersih, short for the Coalition for Clean and Fair Elections (Malay: Gabungan Pilihanraya Bersih dan Adil), is a coalition of 62 non-governmental organisations founded in November 2006. Since its founding, Bersih has been supported by the three main opposition parties, Parti Keadilan Rakyat (PKR), PAS, and DAP. Bersih is the Malay word for "clean" in reference to the claims of large scale corruption in the leading party.

The first Bersih rally on 10 November 2007 was estimated to have drawn between 30,000 and 50,000 people. It was broken up by police using tear gas and chemical-laced water cannons. The rally was said to play a major role in helping the opposition parties make big gains in the 2008 general election.

Bersih 2.0, as the organisation branded itself for the 2011 rally, is chaired by former Bar Council president Ambiga Sreenevasan. Ambiga served as president of the Bar from 2007 to 2009 and is a recipient of the US State Department's International Women of Courage Awards.

=== Demands ===
Ambiga has summed up the main issues raised by the organisation she leads as "unhappiness... in the Sarawak [election], unhappiness about corruption, [and] unhappiness about the independence of our institutions." She said demands made during the first rally in 2007 have not been addressed, hence the follow-up rally.

The communiqué issued by Bersih issued in 2007 called for reforms to Malaysia's first-past-the-post electoral system, ensuring the independence of the Election Commission (EC), eliminating electoral practices deemed unfair to opposition candidates, eliminating corrupt campaign practices, equal access to the media for all political parties, and instituting a caretaker government during election periods, among others in the long term.

The 2011 rally's immediate demands were:

1. Clean the electoral roll
2. Reform postal voting
3. Use of indelible ink
4. A minimum campaign period of 21 days
5. Free and fair access to mainstream media
6. Strengthen public institutions
7. Stop corruption
8. Stop dirty politics

After agreeing to abandon plans for a street demonstration, Bersih also called for a Royal Commission into election practices.

=== Plans ===
The rally's original plan was to have protesters gather at the KL Sogo shopping center, Kuala Lumpur City Hall building, and the Kampung Baru Mosque before marching to the Istana Negara to deliver a memorandum to the Yang di-Pertuan Agong. After consultations with the King, Bersih decided to hold the rally in a stadium instead. However, their request to use Merdeka Stadium was rejected by police. Bersih accused the government of reneging on a previous offer to let them rally in a stadium instead of the streets.

Bersih insisted on gathering at Merdeka Stadium, despite preventative measures taken by police.

==== Abroad ====
Simultaneous rallies in support of Bersih were planned by Malaysian citizens in more than 30 cities in New Zealand, Australia, Japan, South Korea, the Philippines, Taiwan, Hong Kong, Singapore, Thailand, Indonesia, Egypt, Switzerland, Sweden, Austria, France, Great Britain, Ireland, Canada, the United States and Cambodia.

== Lead-up to the rally ==
=== Announcement ===
After frustration at by being shut out of observing the April 2011 Sarawak election, Bersih announced in a press release on 26 May that it had decided to organise a gathering on 9 July to press for electoral reform.

=== Counter-rallies ===
==== Perkasa ====
Malay Supremacy movement Perkasa spoke out strongly against the rally. On 15 June, Perkasa announced that it had secured the support of over 30 non-governmental organisations and challenged Bersih organisers over who could stage a bigger rally on 9 July. It called on Bersih to cancel its rally, warning that clashes might occur. Perkasa president Ibrahim Ali warned "[If they proceed] there will be a clash. If that happens, it is for the better."

On 19 June, Perkasa held a gathering to protest the Bersih rally and to launch an opposing coalition of NGOs known as Gerak Aman. During the gathering, images of Ambiga—described by flyers as "a dangerous Hindu woman"—were burned, while Ibrahim warned the Chinese community not to participate in the Bersih rally.

On 8 July, Perkasa announced the cancellation of its counter-rally due to its inability to secure a venue and a police permit.

==== UMNO Youth ====
UMNO Youth leader Khairy Jamaluddin announced that UMNO Youth will hold another rally on the same day (known as the "Patriot Rally" or Himpunan Patriot) to "strengthen the democratic system" and show that "the voice of the people does not belong only to the opposition." He added that they had "a right to assembly guaranteed by the constitution."

Khairy and Ibrahim became involved in a war of words over the latter's comments on regarding the Chinese community, with each side calling for the other to be investigated under the Sedition Act. Ibrahim later backtracked from his comments.

UMNO Youth's plan was to gather at Bukit Bintang and possibly march towards Merdeka Stadium.

=== Election Commission reaction ===
Bersih's demands were repeatedly dismissed by the Election Commission (EC), who sought to tie the organisation to the opposition's agenda. EC deputy chairman Wan Ahmad Wan Omar claimed Bersih was working with Pakatan Rakyat to "overthrow the government." In turn, Ambiga criticised the EC's conduct, asking them to remain independent from politics.

On 20 June, the EC extended an offer to Bersih to meet and discuss its demands, on the condition that the rally be called off. He claimed that during a previous meeting with Bersih in 2010, it had agreed that its demands were met. Bersih rejected the EC's offer.

Speaking to reporters while observing the Thai general election in July, Abdul Aziz said the EC was considering allowing international observers to monitor the next Malaysian general election.

=== Government reaction ===
Prime minister Najib Razak warned that Bersih would be responsible if chaos ensued from the rally. Home Minister Hishamuddin Hussein warned against the rally, fearing the chaos that might ensue. He affirmed on 7 June that the rally was "illegal," and urged the organisers to call it off. He promised to clamp down on demonstrators if they threatened national security. On 22 June, he confirmed that none of the three rallies would receive police permits to hold gatherings on 9 July.

The government also outlawed the wearing and distribution of Bersih's yellow shirts and declared Bersih an illegal organisation under Section 5 of the Societies Act 1966. Bersih countered that as a coalition of groups it need not be registered.

Najib initially offered Bersih the opportunity of holding the rally in a stadium instead of the streets. The government later rejected Bersih's request to hold the rally at Merdeka Stadium, and asked them to use a stadium in Selangor instead. However, the Sultan of Selangor had previously condemned demonstrations.

=== Opposition reaction ===
PAS deputy president Mohamad Sabu gave the rally his party's full backing. Calling the event the "Walk for Democracy," he asked for 300,000 PAS members to attend the gathering. PAS president Abdul Hadi Awang ordered all of its members (numbering one million) to join the rally. The Leader of the Opposition, Anwar Ibrahim, will also take part in the rally. The DAP also pledged support for the rally.

On 19 June, Anwar reportedly told members of his Parti Keadilan Rakyat (PKR) that he would ask Ambiga to cancel the rally if the government met Bersih's demands. His statement was rebuffed by Ambiga the following day. Anwar later claimed he was misquoted. This incident was criticised by ruling coalition parties, who have argued that the rally is in fact an opposition tool to gain support.

=== Non-governmental organisations ===
The Bersih rally was backed by the Human Rights Commission of Malaysia (Suhakam), Transparency International Malaysia (TI-M), and the Malaysian Consultative Council of Buddhism, Christianity, Hinduism, Sikhism and Taoism (MCCBCHST). The MCCBCHST also backed Perkasa and UMNO Youth's right to hold their rallies.

Amnesty International called on the government to end the "mass repression" of Bersih activists. Human Rights Watch urged the government to release all detained activists, return confiscated material, and permit the rally to proceed. Deputy Asia director Phil Robertson said "Governments that elected Malaysia to a second term on the UN Human Rights Council might feel duped."

The Asia-Europe Peoples' Forum (AEPF), consisting of 120 international NGOs, condemned the Malaysian government for the crackdown on activists.

=== International response ===
On 5 July, the Office of the United Nations High Commissioner for Human Rights voiced concern about the restriction of freedom of expression in Malaysia and urged the government to release detained Bersih activists.

=== Threats of violence ===
On 23 June, Ambiga received a death threat via text message. She remained defiant, saying "nothing has changed" and the rally will go on.

The grandmaster of the Malaysian Silat Lincah Organisation (PSSLM) reportedly threatened to "wage war" against Bersih activists. Najib subsequently endorsed silat groups, including PSSLM.

=== Yang di-Pertuan Agong's intervention ===
Malaysia's head of state, the Yang di-Pertuan Agong, Tuanku Mizan Zainal Abidin, issued a statement on 3 July urging moderation by all parties. He said "street demonstrations bring more bad than good although the original intention is good," and called for Bersih to resolve its differences with the government peacefully. He also expressed confidence in Prime Minister Najib Razak's administration.

Following an audience with the King, Ambiga announced that Bersih accepted the government's offer to hold the rally in a stadium instead of the streets. Despite Bersih's meeting with the King, the government maintained its stance that Bersih is illegal.

=== Police reports and reaction ===
At least 2,136 police reports, from business operators, travel agencies, and UMNO Youth, were filed against Bersih since the rally's announcement. On 15 June, the police announced that permits would not be issued for any rally, saying that the rallies would "disturb the peace" and "cause traffic chaos." Bersih remained defiant despite not receiving the permit, and promised to co-operate with police during the gathering.

Police also investigated allegations that Ambiga received funds from foreign NGOs "to cause chaos in Malaysia."

Police recorded statements from Ambiga, Ibrahim, and opposition politicians ahead of the rally. On 1 July, the police ceased discussions with Bersih, Perkasa and UMNO Youth and promised to prevent any street rallies from taking place.

==== Pre-rally arrests and raids ====
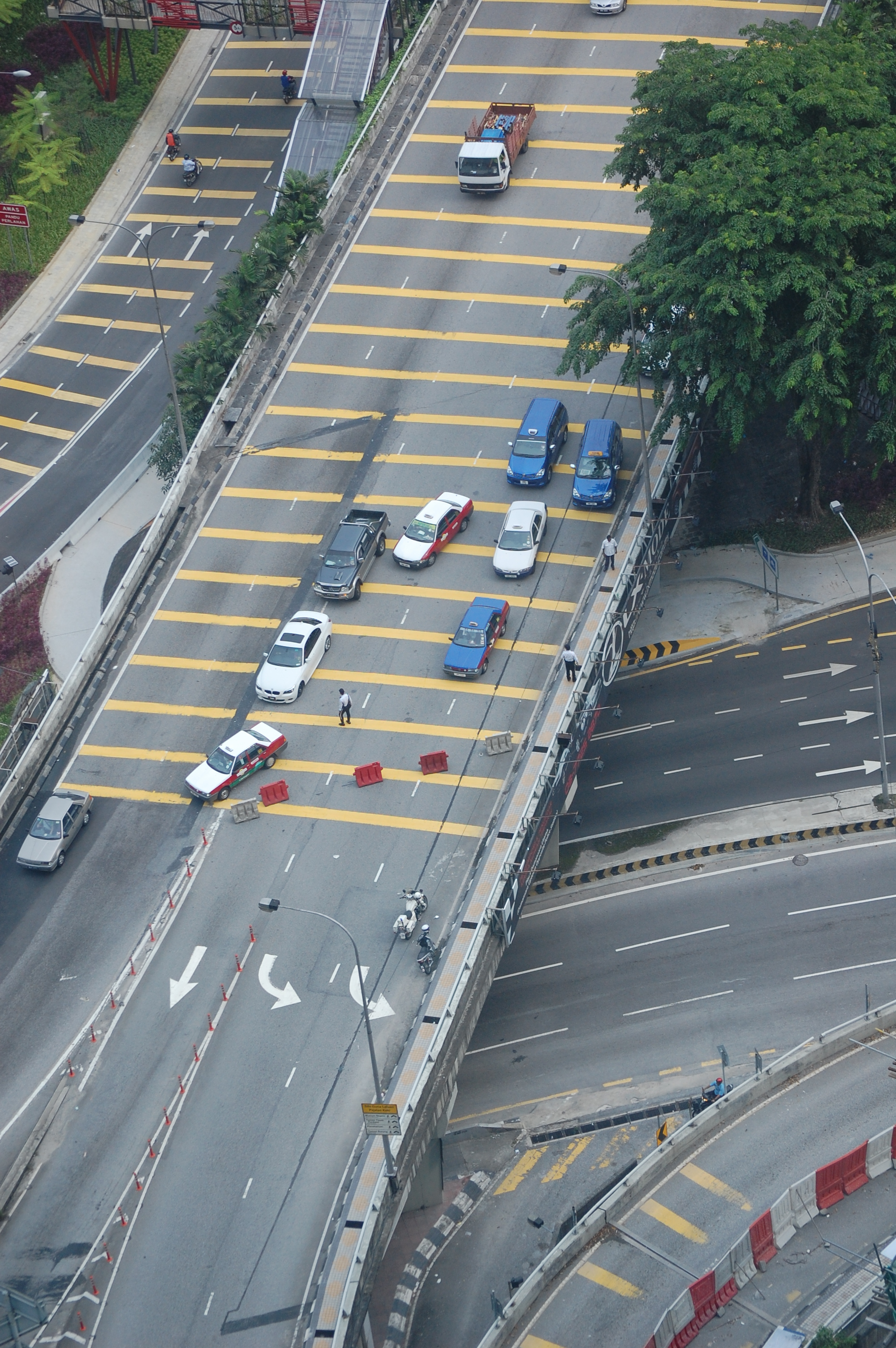
The police enforced road blocks throughout the city to discourage turnout.

More than 150 people were arrested before 9 July for Bersih-related activities, including distributing leaflets. Most were released after several hours of questioning.

30 members of Parti Sosialis Malaysia (PSM) were arrested in Penang on 26 June on suspicion of spreading communism and conspiring to overthrow the government. Six members, including MP Michael Jeyakumar Devaraj, remain held under the Emergency Ordinance 1969, which allows indefinite detention without trial.

Police also raided and vandalised Bersih's office in Petaling Jaya on 30 June.

One day before the planned rally, police released a list of 91 individuals, including Ambiga, Khairy and Ibrahim, barred from entering Kuala Lumpur's central business district on 9 July.

==== Lockdown ====
Police began imposing roadblocks in the Klang Valley on Wednesday, 6 July, which led to massive traffic congestion and complaints from the public. They described it as a "preventive" move to stop protesters from participating in the protest.

On 8 July, police sealed off Merdeka Square and rolled in water cannon and riot police trucks. At midnight on 9 July, major roads in the city was shut and public transportation suspended.

== Protests ==
Kuala Lumpur was described as a "ghost town" on the morning of 9 July. Many offices and shops were closed as police maintained heavy presences in key areas. Crowds began pouring in by noon, where they were met by police who took "extraordinary" security measures, known as "Operation Erase Bersih." Many were arrested and transported to the police training center (Pulapol). The protesters were arrested under Section 27 of the Police Act for planning to participate in illegal rallies, and face several years in prison if convicted.

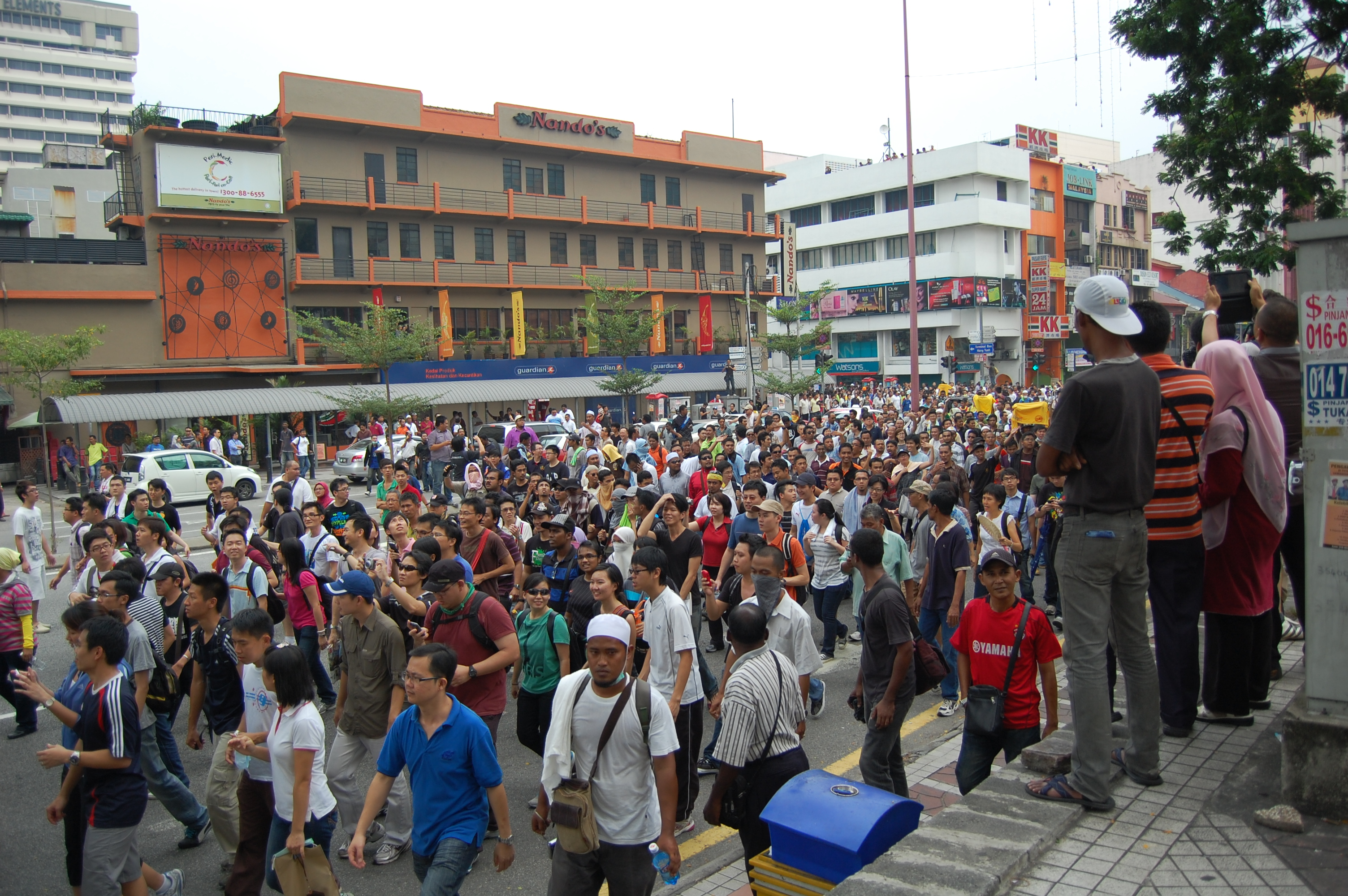
Protesters marching the streets of Kuala Lumpur peacefully before the police confronted them.

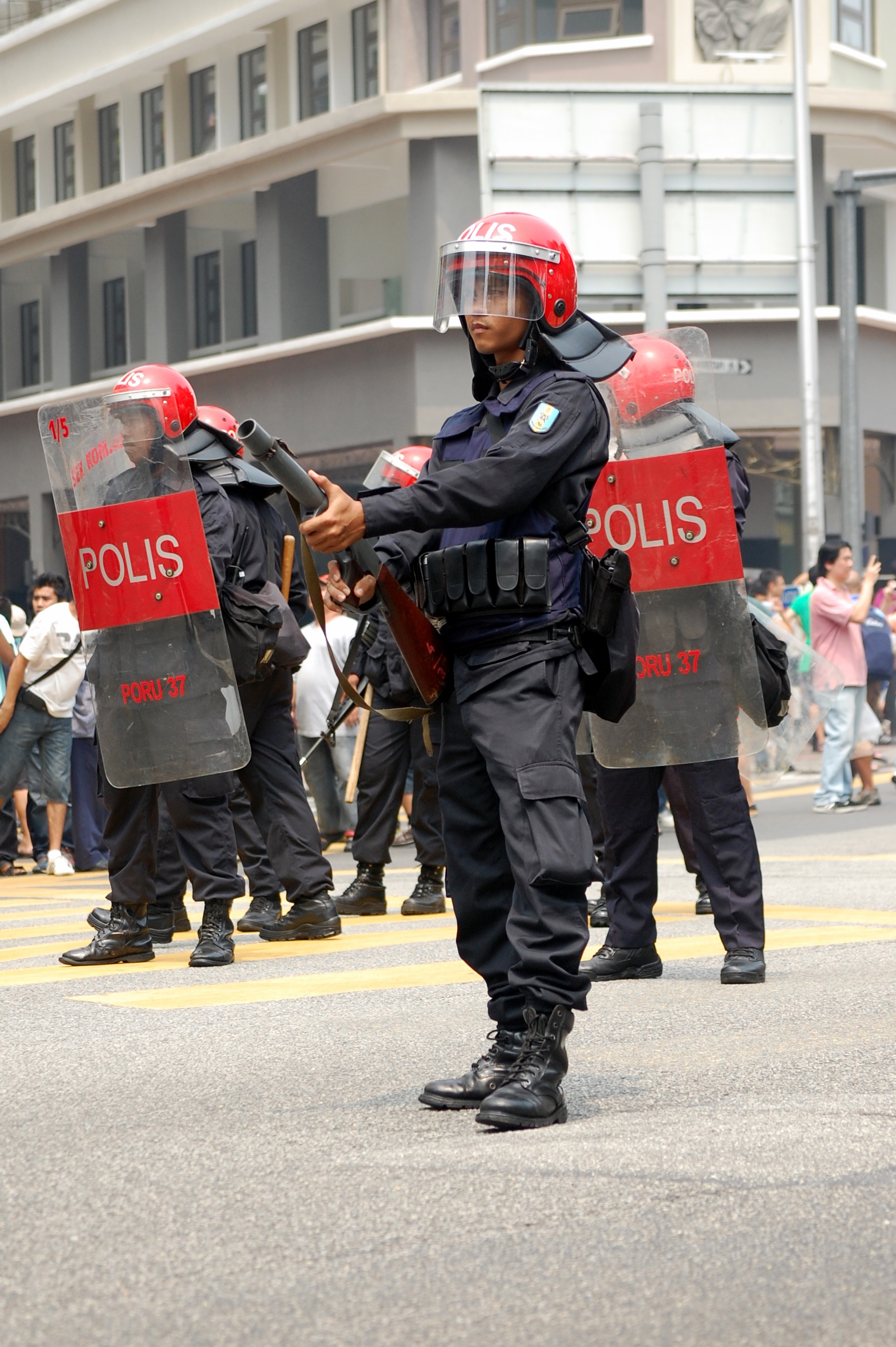
A member of the Federal Reserve Unit prepares to disperse the protesters with tear gas.

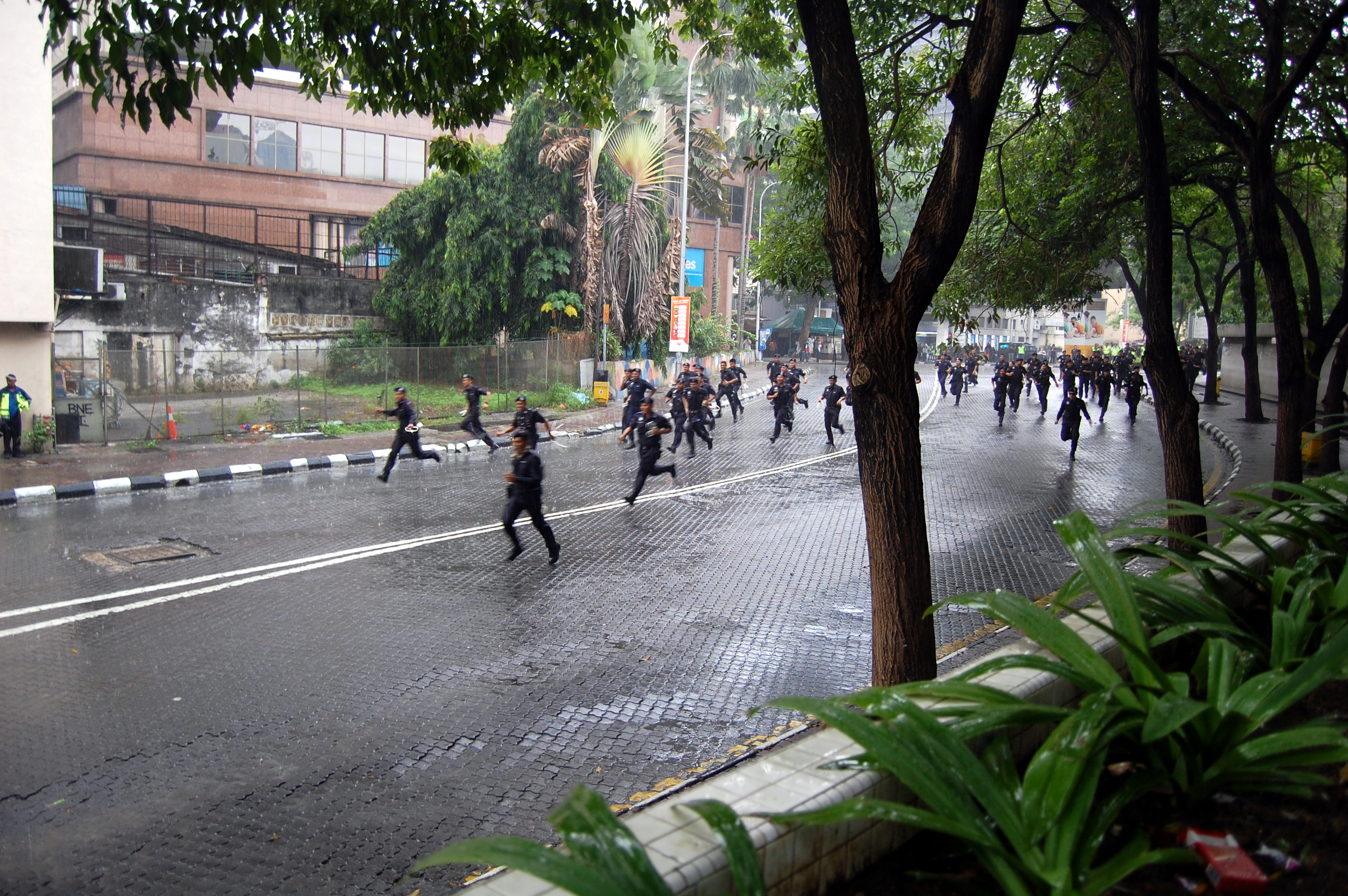
The police force charging at a crowd of regrouping protesters.

Independent assessments put the rally numbers at between 10,000 and over 20,000, while Bersih claimed a turnout of 50,000.

Major gathering points included Menara Maybank, Jalan Pudu, and Puduraya where riot police confronted protesters. Thousands tried to reach Merdeka Stadium from various parts of the city, chanting "Hidup rakyat!" ("Long live the people!"). Police responded by firing numerous rounds of tear gas and chemical-laced water, causing the crowds to disperse into nearby buildings. Police continued to fire tear gas and chemical-laced water at the buildings. Many buildings were targeted by the police including a hospital which the police denied happened even though there are pictures of the water cannons spraying the hospital.

At 14:00, Bersih and Pakatan Rakyat leaders began their march towards Merdeka Stadium. Shielded by hundreds of supporters, they pushed past three lines of police personnel awaiting them outside KL Sentral. Around 14:30, while walking with supporters in Brickfields, Ambiga and fellow steering committee member Maria Chin Abdullah were arrested. Opposition politicians detained include Abdul Hadi Awang, Mohamad Sabu, Salahuddin Ayub, Mahfuz Omar, Dzulkefly Ahmad, Azmin Ali, Tian Chua, Fuziah Salleh, Sivarasa Rasiah, and Ngeh Koo Ham. Anwar Ibrahim said he sustained a bruise on his head and a cut leg when police fired live rounds. PAS MP Khalid Samad was said to have suffered a serious head injury and was admitted to hospital.

UMNO Youth's rally in Bukit Bintang however, was allowed to on peacefully without intervention from the police.

Around 1,000 protesters eventually reached Merdeka Stadium, including national laureate A. Samad Said and PAS's Husam Musa. At around 16:00, the crowd voluntarily began dispersing. However, police continued to fire tear gas and chemical-laced water at any individual and moved in to arrest them. Another group of protesters tried to reach the National Palace, while a third group gathered at Kuala Lumpur City Centre (KLCC) Park beneath the Petronas Twin Towers. Thousands eventually gathered at KLCC but were dispersed by police using tear gas and chemically-laced water.

By 18:40 in the evening, police had confirmed 1,667 arrests, including 167 females and minors. Most of the arrested protesters, including Ambiga, were freed by the end of the day.

One death was reported. Protester Baharuddin Ahmad accidentally inhaled tear gas fired by police. He was later arrested, but when he started to black out police didn't do anything and just stood there and watched. He was restrained by handcuffs which made the matters worse and he wasn't released because police lost the keys. After 15 minutes, an ambulance was called but never arrived. Finally, a volunteer took Baharuddin to a nearby hospital but it was already too late. Police said he died of heart complications.

=== International protests ===
Bersih rallies also commenced in Melbourne, Sydney, Perth, Adelaide, Brisbane and Canberra, Australia, attracting around 750 people, 300 people, 200 people, 150 people, 50 people and 30 people respectively. Rallies were also reported in Auckland, Wellington and Christchurch, New Zealand, as well as in London, England. A gathering of about 120 people was reported at the Speaker's Corner at Hong Lim Park, Singapore. Further rallies were reported in central Hong Kong, Taiwan, Japan, South Korea, Switzerland, Sweden, France, England, Scotland, Ireland, Canada and the United States.

== Aftermath ==
National laureate A. Samad Said called the rally a "great success", lauding the multiracial unity among the protesters. Ambiga, speaking after being released, congratulated those who attended the rally, saying "we were not intimidated." The Bersih leadership commended protesters for behaving peacefully and condemned the police for reacting harshly to the demonstration. They said the gathering was "not the end, it is but one more step in the long walk for clean and fair elections in Malaysia."

Leader of the Opposition Anwar Ibrahim said the rally was a "success" despite "police brutality." DAP secretary-general Lim Guan Eng said the "police abuse" was "a big blow to the image of Malaysia."

Prime Minister Najib Razak downplayed the rally, insisting it only represented a minority of the population. He also said the anti-government sentiment among the protesters confirmed the government's fears that Bersih's agenda had been hijacked by the opposition. Home Minister Hishamuddin Hussein praised the police for keeping the rally under control and said the rally revealed itself to be an opposition plot.

The United States expressed concern over the crackdown. State Department spokesman Mark Toner said "We stand for... the right for people to freely express their democratic aspirations and express their views freely."

Amnesty International released a statement saying: "This brutal crackdown on peaceful protesters is undermining Malaysia’s claim to be a moderate democracy. Mr. Najib’s government has chosen the path of repression, not reform." Lawyers for Liberty released a statement saying that the police deliberately shot gas canisters against the protesters.

=== Reform proposals ===
On 15 August 2011, Najib announced that a parliamentary select committee will be formed to examine the electoral system. He said the committee will consist of members of parliament from both the government and opposition coalition who will discuss electoral reform issues "so that a mutual agreement can be reached."

In his Malaysia Day 2011 address in September, Najib announced the government's intentions to repeal the Internal Security Act, Emergency Ordinance, remove the annual renewal of press and publication permits, and review Section 27 of the Police Act. In November 2011, the government tabled the Peaceful Assembly Act to replace Section 27 of the Police Act.

== Coverage and analysis ==
=== Pre-rally ===
The lead-up to the rally has received polarising coverage in Malaysia's print and internet news media. Malaysia's print media are subject to the Printing Presses and Publications Act, which stipulates they can only publish with a license granted by the Ministry of Home Affairs. A news website has alleged that the Malaysian Communications and Multimedia Commission instructed radio and television stations to omit coverage of police violence and focus on the damage done by rally participants.

State news agency Bernama quoted several political analysts saying that the rally will tarnish Malaysia's image abroad and is a distraction from Anwar Ibrahim's ongoing sodomy trials. It claimed the 1998 demonstrations against Anwar's arrest and the 2007 Bersih rally caused "inconvenience to the public and damage to public property, attracting bad publicity from the international media." One analyst said elections are "already fair as fair can be." Bernama also reported analysts saying that Ambiga has a history of provoking Muslims and working against interests of the Malay community.

==== Print media ====
Utusan Malaysia, a newspaper owned by the United Malays National Organisation (UMNO), a governing party, criticised the rally as "dirty" on a 12 June editorial. In particular, it made reference to Anwar's sodomy trial and sex video allegations, calling him a hypocrite and urging Malaysians to protest against the opposition leader instead. It also warned against disunity among Malays, and claimed that the DAP, backed strongly by Chinese constituents, would benefit most from the rally. Utusan reported that 70 percent of the 1000 who attended the Bersih 2.0 pre-launch on 19 June were non-Malay. The newspaper has also portrayed the rally as anti-Islam. They quoted pro-UMNO political analysts attacking Ambiga for "angering Muslims and Malays," as well as reported that foreign Christian organisations are funding the rally.

Tay Tian Yan wrote in the Sin Chew Daily, the highest circulated daily in Malaysia, that the rally is a repeat scenario of the 2007 protest, where the opposition cashed in on public discontent over rising prices and staged the rally to generate momentum ahead of the general election. He also noted that the counter-rally by UMNO Youth is a ploy by BN to mitigate the Bersih rally's momentum, as opposed to suppressing the rally outright, which he said would swing public opinion against BN. Lim Sue Goan noted the involvement of Pakatan Rakyat and UMNO in opposite rallies, and said the event has grown from becoming a mere march to demand free elections to a political showdown between the government and opposition.

In a 22 June editorial, The Star, owned by the Malaysian Chinese Association (MCA), also a governing party, said opposition parties are colluding with the rally's organisers to discredit the authorities in an attempt to gain support ahead of the elections. It accused Bersih of "[creating] cynical distrust in the authorities to give [themselves] and their political ringleaders a psychological advantage."

Johan Jaaffar, chairman of Media Prima (owned by UMNO), the parent company of the New Straits Times, wrote in the paper: "The government of the day is not perfect. So, too, the system... we don't solve problems on the streets. That's not us, nor our way."

M Faqih, writing in the PAS organ Harakah Daily, compared the planned rally to the September 1998 protests in Kuala Lumpur against then-deputy prime minister Anwar Ibrahim's sacking and detention on sodomy and corruption charges, which he described as peaceful unlike the revolutions in Tunisia and Egypt. He called on the opposition to seize the initiative with public discontent over government policies and use the rally as a stepping stone to victory in next general election.

==== Internet news ====
Josh Hong of Malaysiakini questioned the law requiring protest organisers to obtain permits, saying the freedom of speech and right to assembly are guaranteed by the Constitution. He also criticised the government's record of cracking down civil rights campaigners and political activists and the mainstream media's demonisation of the Bersih rally. Fellow columnists Mariam Mokhtar and Dean Johns criticised the government's crackdown on Bersih.

News website The Malaysian Insider called the government's tough stand against the Bersih rally "double standards," deriding the government's non-action against Ibrahim Ali, who had earlier called for jihad against Christians. It also blamed the police for the chaos that occurred during the 2007 rally and dismissed the government's concern for national security and threat to tourism as self-caused. The website reported analysts saying the rally will help PAS cement the growing support the party has gained among the Malay community.

Free Malaysia Today, another news website, argued in favour of the rally, saying that concerns that it will serve as a "spring offensive" to overthrow the government are exaggerated. It lamented what it perceived as Malaysia's flawed democracy, saying "[there] are two ways to punish political perverts who have raped democracy: vote them out or take to the streets." It also criticised the government for threatening to clamp down on protesters, saying that the ruling coalition is using public order as an excuse to preserve its stay in power. In another editorial the day before the rally, FMT was highly critical of the government, asking the people to "decide the course of history" and defy a "harsh and repressive" state.

==== International ====
In an op-ed for The Wall Street Journal, former US ambassador to Malaysia John R. Malott said Najib's UMNO is "running scared" of losing power and is waging a campaign of intimidation against Bersih. He called the protest "a brave step" towards the country's transition to full democracy.

Professor Clive Kessler of the University of New South Wales in an interview with ABC Radio stated that the Agong's intervention was a rebuke to Umno and the government and an acknowledgement of Bersih’s legitimacy.

=== Reactions to the rally ===
Newspapers owned by Barisan Nasional parties were highly critical of the rally, accusing Bersih of disturbing the peace. Utusan Malaysia called the police operation to foil the illegal rally a success. The Star remarked in an editorial the following day: "If every complaint made one or the other party take to the streets, bringing a city to a standstill, people would not be getting much work done." It said Bersih achieved the publicity it sought, and that everyone should move on. The New Straits Times said there was "no winner in this madness" as many were hurt, and "Bersih's intentions were hijacked by the opposition coalition." NST's 10 July front page featured a photo of a protester throwing an object with the headline "Peaceful?"

The Malaysian Insider's Debra Chong said Najib's administration "took a massive punch to its gut," as accounts of police personnel using tear gas and water cannons against unarmed civilians were reported by international media. She said the rally showed the willingness of the middle class and civil society to stand up to the government. TMI's Sheridan Mahavera said the rally was a display of racial unity. Jeswan Kaur of Free Malaysia Today said Najib and the police were to blame for the chaotic scenes.

Ibrahim Suffian, head of the Merdeka Center, an independent think tank, said the actions of Bersih and the government polarised Malaysians of opposite political opinions. "For Pakatan Rakyat supporters, it has just increased their scepticism of the [BN-ruled] government. For those who are pro-government, it has hardened their belief that the PR is out to cause trouble." One analyst accused Barisan Nasional of abusing public institutions to protect its power, while another added that "the police lost more credibility than the protesters."

International reaction was unanimously critical of the government. The Singapore Straits Times added that Malaysian society has been polarised by the country’s divisive politics as clearly demonstrated when thousands braved a security lockdown of Kuala Lumpur. In an editorial, the Jakarta Post described Malaysia as a "rich but not free" country, with its leaders still "laboring under an old paradigm" and refusing to allow its people to exercise their rights to free speech by invoking racial tension. Al Jazeera English's Teymoor Nabili said the government acted out of fear of an Egypt-style revolution. Bloomberg columnist William Pesek calls the rally a part of the "rising call for political change in Asia" that play a decisive role in foreign investment to Asian countries. The Asian Sentinel stated that although Najib Tun Razak appears to have won the battle by closing down Kuala Lumpur on Saturday and arresting 1,667 mostly peaceful marchers and would-be marchers, the consensus seems to be that Malaysia has suffered a blow to its international reputation as a moderate, democratic country.

The Guardian's Simon Tisdall slammed Malaysian Prime Minister Najib Razak's harsh treatment towards the peaceful rally participants, noting that the British Prime Minister David Cameron should tell Najib that "strong-arm tactics against protesters are unacceptable" and that "Malaysia's leaders should wake up and smell the coffee".

=== Censorship ===
The Economist's coverage of the rally was partially censored by the government. Four lines in the article titled "Taken to the cleaners – an overzealous government response to an opposition rally" was inked out. Najib later admitted that censoring parts of the article was a mistake which generated negative publicity.

== Criticism ==
=== Election Commission ===
The Election Commission of Malaysia (EC) has dismissed Bersih's claims, saying that it has already met the organisation's demands. EC chairman Abdul Aziz Mohd Yusof, who met with Bersih officials in December 2010, slammed Bersih chairman Ambiga's knowledge of voter registration as "shallow." Abdul Aziz also claimed that Bersih had a political agenda, saying that the opposition parties were propping up the organisation. He claimed the opposition were using the EC as a scapegoat for political gain.

==== Response to demands ====
- Responding to Bersih's demand that voter registration be automatic once a citizen reaches voting age, Abdul Aziz said such a proposal would contravene Article 119 (4) of the Constitution, which he claims clearly states that registration as a voter can only be done through application by the voter him/herself. EC deputy chairman Wan Ahmad Wan Omar added that unregistered voters are "indifferent," and will not bother to vote anyway.
- Abdul Aziz also defended against allegations that the EC is lackadaisical in tackling phantom voting. He said that the EC cannot strike names of dead voters off the electoral roll unless the family of a dead voter requests it and produces the dead voter's death certificate. He also blamed allegations of voting in multiple constituencies on voters who refuse to change the addresses on their identification cards when they move homes.
- Wan Ahmad said the use of indelible ink is "regressive" and only practised in less developed countries. He also raised the possibility of voters not wanting their fingers inked and voters who somehow inked their fingers before voting. Abdul Aziz said the EC was considering a biometric fingerprinting system instead.
- Wan Ahmad said a 21-day campaign period is "unnecessary" as Malaysia has a relatively small land area and population.

=== Government ===
The rally has been roundly criticised by government politicians, who claim that the opposition are using the rally, purportedly a non-partisan protest, to advance its own political agenda. Some ministers also accused the rally organisers of attempting a coup d'état.

Prime minister Najib said claims that elections are unfair "did not make sense," adding that the opposition are using instability to their political advantage. He challenged them to take on the government in the polls instead. The Home Minister, Hishamuddin, responding to early reports announcing the rally, criticised public demonstrations in particular. He slammed Bersih for trying to "instill hatred" and "show the world that our country is chaotic." Deputy Prime Minister Muhyiddin Yassin said the planned rally is "undemocratic" and claimed that it is supported only by a small segment of the population. He also warned of foreign powers taking advantage of instability in Malaysia.

=== UMNO ===
UMNO's information chief Ahmad Maslan said that the event might risk damaging the economy and national security. UMNO Youth leader Khairy Jamaluddin said Anwar's attempts to exert influence over the rally on 19 June was proof that Bersih was "compromised" by the opposition. UMNO Youth executive council member Tengku Azman Tengku Zainol Abidin said public rallies should not be held on the streets and that the 2007 Bersih rally "achieved nothing."

Anwar's former political secretary Senator Ezam Mohd Noor called Anwar a hypocrite, saying that Anwar's own PKR party election in 2010 was rife with allegations of manipulation.

=== Perkasa ===
Perkasa has criticised the rally for threatening to spread chaos, claiming that the opposition will use the rally to trigger an uprising similar to Egypt and Libya. Perkasa president Ibrahim Ali also threw his support behind the EC, arguing that they had already answered demands for free and fair elections. Ibrahim Ali also warned Chinese community should avoid joining this rally and stay away from it by keeping food at home.

=== Independents ===
"Independent" Member of Parliament Zulkifli Nordin questioned the need for the rally, claiming that democracy was already "alive," citing the result of the previous election as an example. Fellow independent MP Wee Choo Keong hinted that Bersih's cause is "politically motivated," and advised Ambiga to join a political party instead of "hiding behind a non-governmental organisation."

=== Business ===
Sections of the business community initially condemned the proposed street rally, arguing that business operators would have suffered losses on 9 July, a Saturday. Among the groups opposed to the rally were the KL and Selangor Indian Chamber of Commerce and Industry, the Malaysian Associated Indian Chamber of Commerce and Industry, and the Executive Taxi Owners' Association.

UMNO encouraged business operators and taxi drivers to sue Bersih for any losses that may be caused by the rally.

== See also ==
- Elections in Malaysia
- List of protests in the 21st century
