= Peaceful Assembly Act 2012 =

Parliament of Malaysia
- Long title: An Act relating to the right to assemble peaceably and without arms, and to provide restrictions deemed necessary or expedient relating to such right in the interest of the security of the Federation or any part thereof or public order, including the protection of the rights and freedoms of other persons, and to provide for related matters.
- Citation: Act 736
- Territorial extent: Malaysia
- Passed by: Dewan Rakyat
- Passed: 29 November 2011
- Passed by: Dewan Negara
- Passed: 20 December 2011
- Royal assent: 30 January 2012
- Effective: 23 April 2012 [P.U. (B) 147/2012]
- White paper: Peaceful Assembly Bill prepared by the Bar Council

Legislative history

Initiating chamber: Dewan Rakyat
- Bill title: Peaceful Assembly Bill 2011
- Bill citation: D.R. 42/2011
- Introduced by: Najib Razak, Prime Minister
- First reading: 22 November 2011
- Second reading: 24 November 2011
- Third reading: 29 November 2011

Revising chamber: Dewan Negara
- Bill title: Peaceful Assembly Bill 2011
- Bill citation: D.R. 42/2011
- Member(s) in charge: Liew Vui Keong, Deputy Minister in the Prime Minister's Department
- First reading: 7 December 2011
- Second reading: 20 December 2011
- Third reading: 20 December 2011

Final stages

Amended by
- Peaceful Assembly (Amendment) Act 2019 [A1600]

Related legislation
- Police Act 1967, Election Offences Act 1954, Industrial Relations Act 1967, Trade Unions Act 1959

Keywords
- Freedom of assembly
- Status: In force

The Peaceful Assembly Act 2012 (Malay: Akta Perhimpunan Aman 2012, abbreviated PAA) is the law which regulates public protests in Malaysia. According to the Barisan Nasional government, the Act allows citizens to organise and participate in assemblies peaceably and without arms, subject to restrictions deemed necessary and in the interest of public order and security.

The Act was drafted four months after the Bersih 2.0 rally and two months after the government announced its intention to amend the Police Act. It was tabled in Parliament on 22 November 2011, passed by the Dewan Rakyat on 29 November, and approved by the Senate on 20 December. It officially became law on 23 April 2012.

The PAA has been strongly criticised by the opposition, which says that the new law will crackdown on the right to protest instead of safeguarding it. The Bar Council and various civil society leaders have also spoken out against the Act.

== Background ==
Prime Minister Najib Razak promised multiple reform initiatives on his Malaysia Day address on 15 September 2011, including repealing the Internal Security Act and abolishing permits for the print media.

An editorial by the United Malays National Organisation (UMNO)-owned New Straits Times said the PAA "is a step, among recent others, [by Najib] to fulfil the promises made in his Malaysia Day address, which included a repeal of stringent laws that had outlived their usefulness." It said that the bill "will enable peaceful airings of grievances and other expressions through public assemblies" without being a "carte blanche for unruly street protests". According to the New Straits Times, this is a step by Najib "to take the country’s constitutional democracy to a higher and more mature plane."

While debating the law in Parliament, Najib described it as "revolutionary in nature and a giant leap in terms of improving on current laws." Two government members of parliament have hailed the proposed Act as a step towards the government becoming more accepting of public assemblies. Former Prime Minister Mahathir Mohamad praised the PAA as having "good intentions ... besides preventing certain quarters from taking advantage of a situation, so that violence does not become a problem to the country."

The PAA was passed by the Dewan Rakyat on 29 November 2011 with no dissenting votes after opposition members of parliament staged a walkout during the final debate. Some 500 people staged a protest outside Parliament during the vote. It was passed by 39–8 in the Dewan Negara on 20 December 2011. The law officially came into force on 23 April 2012.

In 2019, an amendment on this Act was made by the Pakatan Harapan government who came into power after the 2018 general election. Prior to this amendment, organisers must notify the police 10 days before the assembly. The notice period was reduced from 10 days to 5 days after the amendment. The amendment also saw the time limit for police to respond to an organiser's notice reduced from 5 days to 3 days, and the ban on street protest abolished. Offences under Section 9 and 15 of the PAA were also converted into compoundable offences with a RM5,000 fine, which is not classified as a crime and parliamentarians found to have violated these sections would not lose their seats or eligibility to contest in election.

== Legal provisions ==
=== General provisions ===
The PAA has replaced Section 27 of the Police Act 1967, which means police permits for mass assemblies are no longer be required. Instead, organisers must notify the officer in charge of the police district (OCPD) within 5 days before the gathering date. The OCPD will respond to the notification within 3 days, outlining the restrictions and conditions imposed. Before an amendment in 2019, organisers must notify the OCPD 10 days in advance, while the police shall respond within 5 days.

An organiser may appeal to the Minister of Home Affairs if he/she feels aggrieved by the restrictions and conditions and the minister will respond within 24 hours (previously 48 hours before 2019). Any person convicted of failing to comply with the restrictions and conditions can be fined up to RM10,000.

The PAA previously ban any assembly in the form of street protest. However, the ban on street protest was abolished in 2019.

Any person below the age of 21 cannot be an organiser. Any person below the age of 15 cannot participate in an assembly, except those listed in the Second Schedule.

The Act also bars any gathering within 50 m of "prohibited places" such as hospitals, petrol stations, airports, railway stations, places of worship and schools.

Organisers do not need to submit a notice to the police if the said assembly is held at a "designated place of assembly". As of December 2024, Stadium Darul Makmur Pahang is the only place in Malaysia that is gazetted as a "designated place of assembly" under Section 25 of the PAA. However, according to a 2017 regulation, organizers still need to make an application to the stadium owner 30 days in advance, even though a notice to the police is no longer required, and the stadium owner shall given its reply 7 days before the assembly.

=== Structure ===
The Peaceful Assembly Act 2012, in its current form (as of 1 December 2019), consists of 6 Parts containing 28 sections and 4 schedules.

- Part I: Preliminary
- Part II: Right to Assemble Peaceably and Without Arms
- Part III: Responsibilities of Organizers, Participants and Police
- Part IV: Requirements on Organizing of Assembly
- Part V: Enforcement
- Part VI: Miscellaneous
- Schedules

=== First Schedule – Prohibited Places ===
- Dams
- Reservoirs
- Water catchment areas
- Water treatment plants
- Electricity generating stations
- Petrol stations
- Hospitals
- Fire stations
- Airports
- Railways
- Land public transport terminals
- Ports
- Canals
- Docks
- Wharves
- Piers
- Bridges
- Marinas
- Places of worship
- Kindergartens
- Schools

=== Second Schedule – Assemblies in which A Child May Participate ===
- Religious assemblies
- Funeral processions
- Assemblies related to custom
- Assemblies approved by the Minister

=== Third Schedule – Assemblies for which Notification Is Not Required ===
- Religious assemblies
- Funeral processions
- Wedding receptions
- Open houses during festivities
- Family gatherings
- Family day held by an employer for the benefit of his or her employees and their families
- General meetings of societies or associations

== Constitutional challenges ==
In 2014, a three-judge panel of the second-highest court in the Malaysian judiciary, the Court of Appeal, declared Section 9(5) of the law unconstitutional in a challenge to the law brought by Selangor State Legislative Assembly deputy speaker Nik Nazmi Nik Ahmad. Nik Nazmi was charged with organising an assembly without providing authorities 10 days notice prior to the event. He faced a fine of RM10,000 under Section 9(5), which provides for criminal punishment of assembly organisers who do not provide 10 days notice of an assembly to the authorities. Nik Nazmi appealed his conviction to the Court of Appeal, which unanimously ruled that Section 9(5) of the law violated the constitutional right to peaceful assembly and acquitted Nik Nazmi.

One of the three-judge bench, Justice Mah Weng Kwai, wrote in his opinion that Section 9(1), which requires the 10-day notice period, is also unconstitutional. The other two judges, Justices Mohd Ariff Mohd Yusof and Hamid Sultan Abu Backer, penned separate judgments declaring that only Section 9(5) was unconstitutional. Ariff wrote: "The Section 9(1) requirement of 10 days' notice under the PAA is constitutional, but Section 9(5) that punishes peaceful assembly is unconstitutional." Hamid's opinion was that "The right to peaceful assembly is guaranteed under Article 10(1) (b) of the Federal Constitution and hence, it cannot be criminalised." Mah in his opinion called Section 9(5) a "mockery of the right to freedom of assembly."

However, in 2015, a different three-judge panel of the Court of Appeal unanimously upheld the constitutionality of Section 9(5) in the case of politician R. Yuneswaran. Court of Appeal President Md Raus Sharif authored a unanimous judgment for the three-judge panel, which also included Justices Mohd Zawawi Salleh and Zamani A Rahim. Yuneswaran had been convicted of an offense under Section 9(5) and appealed the conviction, but when it reached the Court of Appeal, the court subsequently upheld both Yuneswaran's conviction and the constitutionality of Section 9(5), ruling that citizens are still able to exercise the constitutional right to peaceful assembly even subject to the penalties of Section 9(5). Yuneswaran's lawyer Sivarasa Rasiah told the press: "It is an unsatisfactory state of the law and against the normal judicial conventions, where you have one Court of Appeal basically overruling another Court of Appeal. That job should be left to the Federal Court."

Another politician, Member of Parliament for Ipoh Timor Thomas Su, was also charged under Section 9 of the act in 2013. After the ruling in Nik Nazmi's case, Su filed for dismissal of the charges, but received a dismissal not amounting to acquittal. Without a formal acquittal, he was subsequently charged again for the original offense in 2016. He then received an acquittal in 2018, when the Attorney General's Chambers withdrew the charges. According to Human Resources Minister M. Kulasegaran, the then recently elected Pakatan Harapan government had instructed the Attorney General to review Section 9(1) of the Act, which was the provision under which Su had been charged. Su's lead counsel Ramkarpal Singh called Su's acquittal a positive step towards abolishing that provision, which he said "curtails freedom of speech."

On 1 July 2025, a five-judge panel of the Federal Court invalidated section 9(5), calling it amounts to a prohibition and also a disproportionate incursion on freedom of assembly.

== Criticism ==
Opposition leaders have called the PAA "undemocratic" and have asked for it to be withdrawn. Leader of the Opposition Anwar Ibrahim said the Bill "gives absolute powers to the police, with which the appeal rests with the minister. This is not democratic." Democratic Action Party MP Lim Kit Siang warned against "forcing" the Bill through Parliament without public consultation.

Bar Council president Lim Chee Wee said the new legislation is more restrictive than the present one. "History is full of civil disobedience and events, which have led to changes for the better in the country ... Processions or assemblies in motion are very much deep in the history of Malaysia ... which is why we urge the government — do not, with the stroke of the pen, strike back against the very foundation of this nation," he said. On the day of voting, the Bar Council led hundreds of lawyers in a "Walk for Freedom" march from the Lake Gardens to Parliament house.

Bersih 2.0 leader Ambiga Sreenevasan has also voiced her opposition to the PAA, saying, "This Bill restricts our rights as much as possible. It gives unfettered powers to the minister and the police to further restrict the freedom to assemble. It impinges on free speech. In short, it will stymie legitimate dissent in our country."

In 2014, Maina Kiai, the UN Special Rapporteur on the rights to freedom of peaceful assembly and of association, criticised the Peaceful Assembly Act's restrictions on youth and non-citizens in a report to the Human Rights Council. Kiai acknowledged that there may be safety concerns when young people participate in some public assemblies, but wrote that Malaysia's laws were not tailored narrowly enough to specifically address that concern. He concluded that the blanket age-based bans were contrary to article 15 of the Convention on the Rights of the Child. He also criticised the law's prohibition against non-citizens taking part in peaceful assemblies, saying that "groups that are disenfranchised from mainstream political activities, such as voting and holding office, have an even greater need for alternative means to participate in the public sphere. Peaceful assemblies are an important tool for allowing the voices of otherwise excluded groups to be heard."
