= 2016 in Malaysia =

- Decades: 1990s; 2000s; 2010s; 2020s
- See also: Other events of 2016; History of Malaysia • Timeline • Years

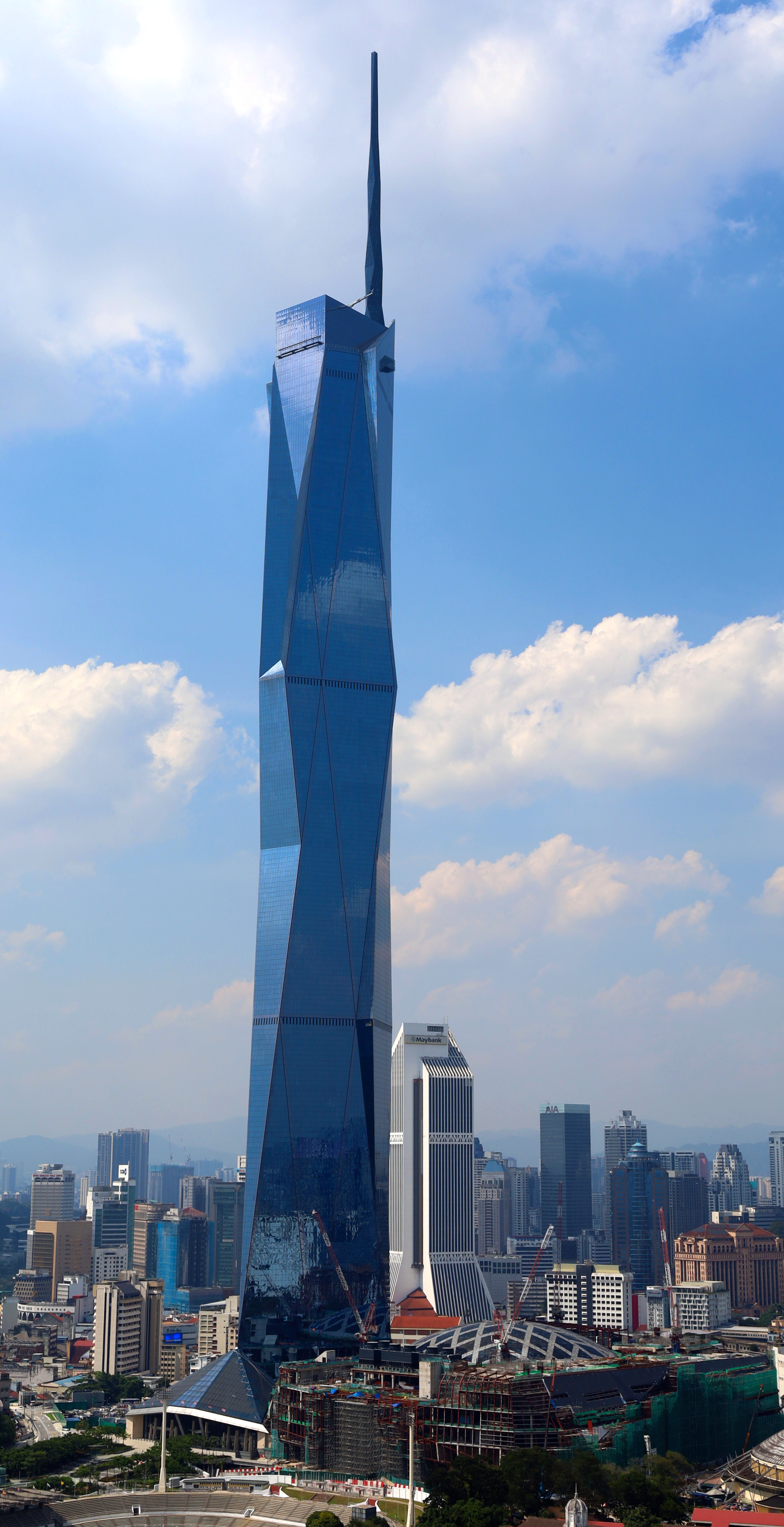
The new Warisan Merdeka KL118, which will be known as PNB 118.

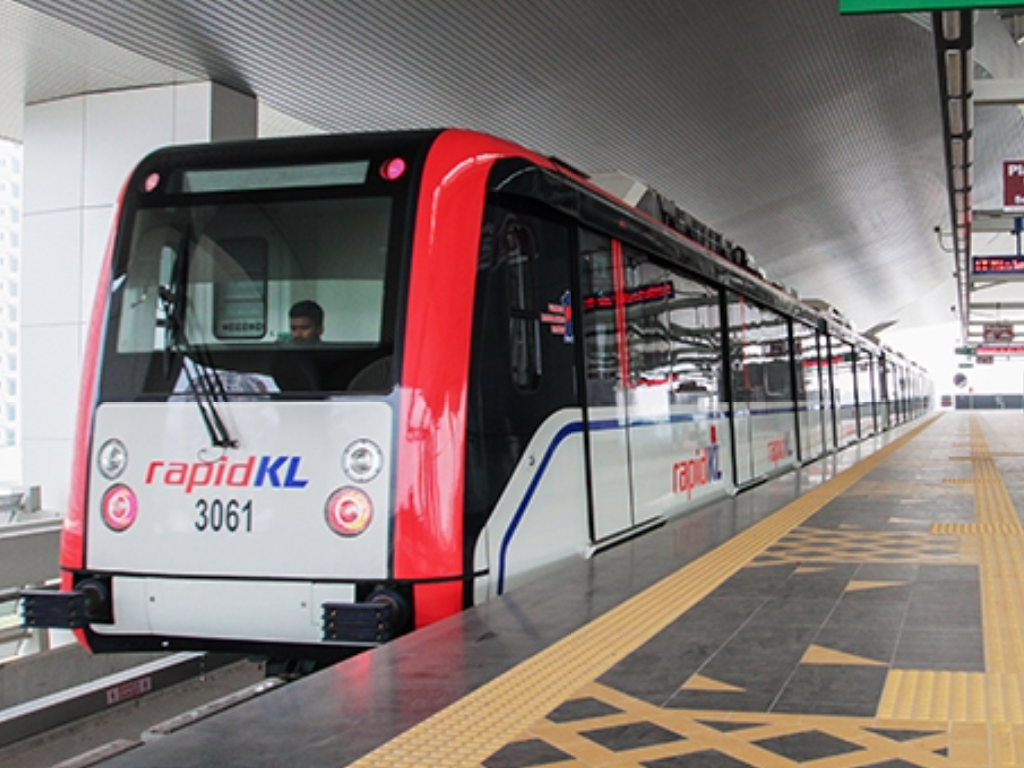
A new Ampang Line train sets for Ampang Line extension.

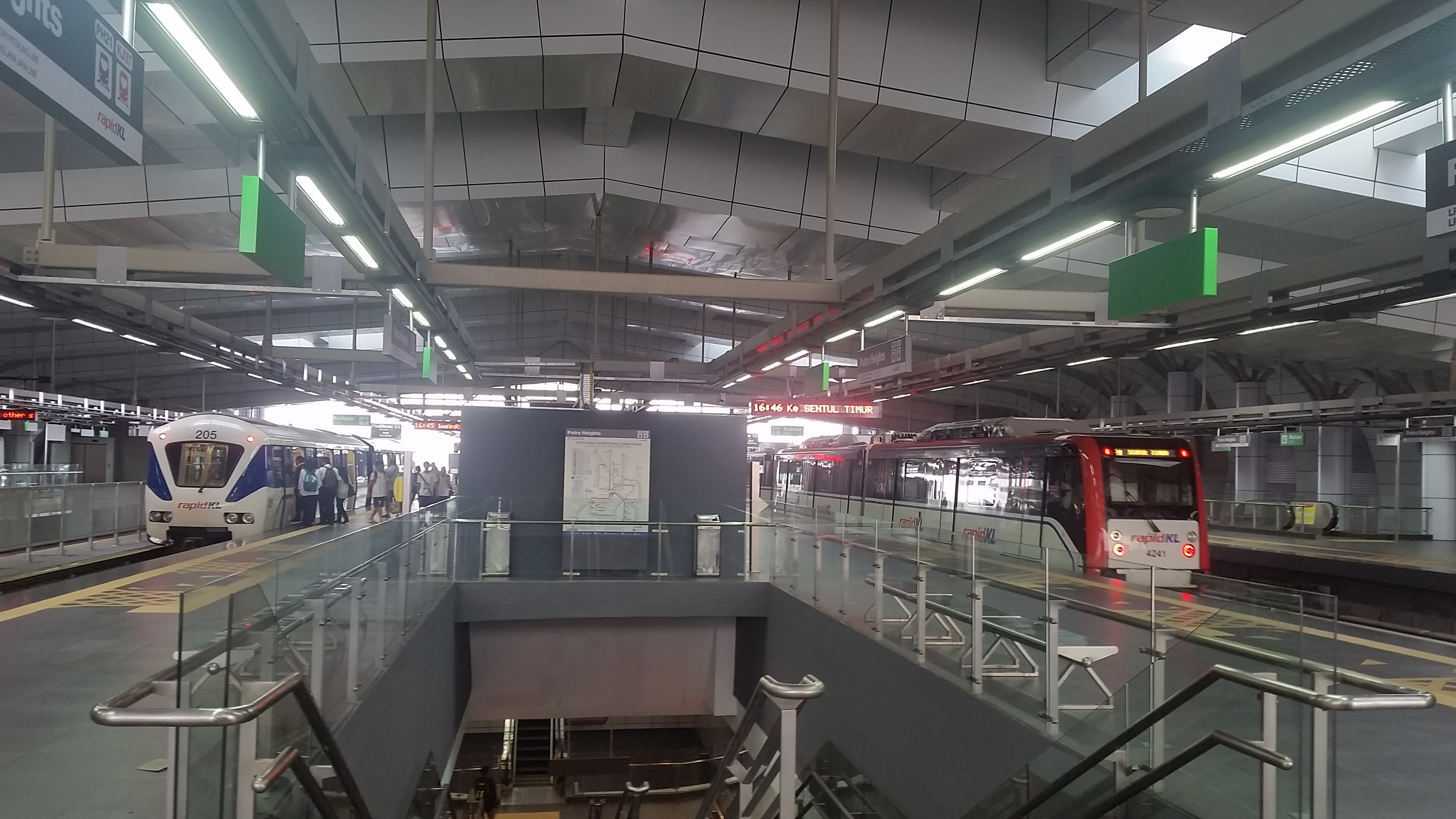
The Putra Heights LRT station the terminus of the Kelana Jaya Line and Sri Petaling Line.

2016 in Malaysia is the 59th anniversary of Malaysia's independence.

== Incumbents ==
=== Federal level ===
- Yang di-Pertuan Agong:
  - Sultan Abdul Halim Mu'adzam Shah of Kedah (until 12 December)
  - Sultan Muhammad V of Kelantan (from 13 December)
- Raja Permaisuri Agong:
  - Sultanah Haminah Hamidun of Kedah (until 12 December)
  - Vacant (from 13 December)
- Deputy Yang di-Pertuan Agong:
  - Sultan Muhammad V of Kelantan (until 12 December)
  - Sultan Nazrin Muizzuddin Shah of Perak (from 13 December)
- Prime Minister: Mohammad Najib Abdul Razak
- Deputy Prime Minister: Ahmad Zahid Hamidi
- President of the Dewan Negara:
  - Abu Zahar Ujang (until 25 April)
  - Vigneswaran Sanasee (from 26 April)
- Speaker of the Dewan Rakyat: Pandikar Amin Mulia
- Chief Justice: Arifin Zakaria

=== State level ===
- Johor:
  - Sultan of Johor: Sultan Ibrahim
  - Menteri Besar of Johor: Mohamed Khaled Nordin
- Kedah:
  - Sultan of Kedah: (Council of Regency of Kedah until 12 December)
    - Tunku Sallehuddin (chairman)
    - Tunku Abdul Hamid Thani (Members I)
    - Tunku Puteri Intan Safinaz (Members II)
  - Menteri Besar of Kedah:
    - Mukhriz Mahathir (until 3 February)
    - Ahmad Bashah Md Hanipah (from 4 February)
- Kelantan:
  - Sultan of Kelantan: Tengku Muhammad Faiz Petra (Regent from 13 December)
  - Menteri Besar of Kelantan: Ahmad Yaakob
- Perlis:
  - Raja of Perlis: Tuanku Syed Sirajuddin
  - Menteri Besar of Perlis: Azlan Man
- Perak:
  - Sultan of Perak: Sultan Nazrin Muizzuddin Shah
  - Menteri Besar of Perak: Zambry Abdul Kadir
- Pahang:
  - Sultan of Pahang: Sultan Haji Ahmad Shah Al-Musta'in Billah
  - Menteri Besar of Pahang: Adnan Yaakob
- Selangor:
  - Sultan of Selangor: Sultan Sharafuddin Idris Shah
  - Menteri Besar of Selangor: Mohamed Azmin Ali
- Terengganu:
  - Sultan of Terengganu: Sultan Mizan Zainal Abidin
  - Menteri Besar of Terengganu: Ahmad Razif Abdul Rahman
- Negeri Sembilan:
  - Yang di-Pertuan Besar of Negeri Sembilan: Tuanku Muhriz
  - Menteri Besar of Negeri Sembilan: Mohamad Hasan
- Penang:
  - Governor of Penang: Tun Abdul Rahman Abbas
  - Chief Minister of Penang: Lim Guan Eng
- Malacca:
  - Governor of Malacca: Tun Mohd Khalil Yaakob
  - Chief Minister of Malacca: Idris Haron
- Sarawak:
  - Governor of Sarawak: Tun Abdul Taib Mahmud
  - Chief Minister of Sarawak: Adenan Satem
- Sabah:
  - Governor of Sabah: Tun Juhar Mahiruddin
  - Chief Minister of Sabah: Musa Aman

== Events ==
=== January ===
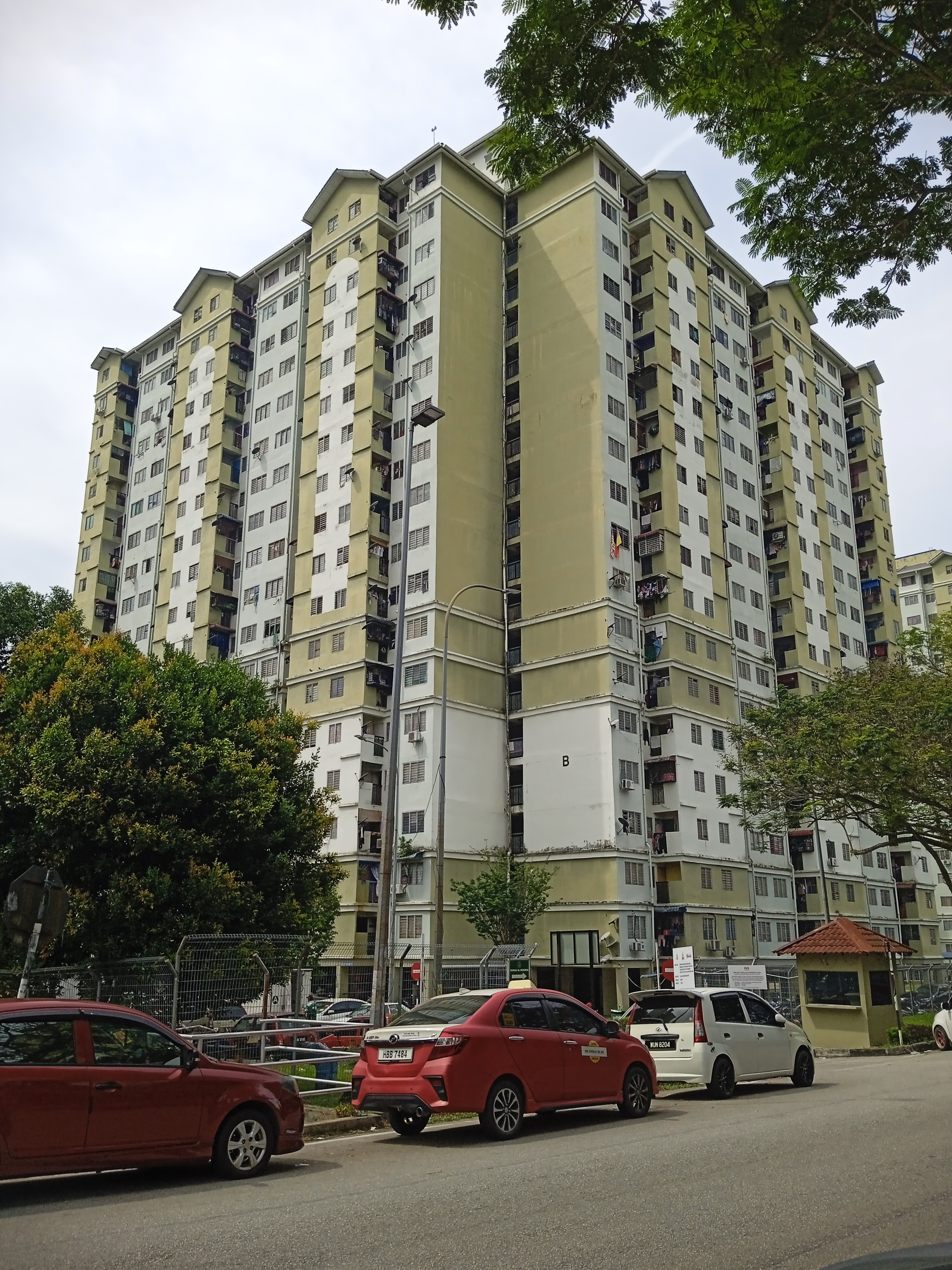
Projek Perumahan Rakyat house at Kota Damansara.

- 1 January
  - The price of RON95 down by RM 0.10. The price of RON 97 down by RM 0.20 and Diesel down by RM 0.30.
  - Johor and Kelantan bans vape and all vape stores in both states are closed.
  - Johor changed its district names. Nusajaya is renamed as Iskandar Puteri. Meanwhile, Kulaijaya and Ledang districts are renamed as Kulai and Tangkak districts.
  - A&W drive in restaurant in Seremban, Negeri Sembilan has ceased its premises after 37 years in operation which was begun in 1978.
  - The toll collection of the Tun Salahuddin Bridge in Kuching, Sarawak is abolished.
  - More people were evacuated in flood-hit Sarawak, raising the number of evacuees to 975 as of noon from 523 in the morning.
  - KTM Komuter Northern Sector extends its service from Butterworth to Padang Besar.
- 2 January – The cabinet decided to halt all bauxite mining operation in Kuantan, Pahang.
- 4 January – All 120 vape outlets in Johor have ceased operations after various government agencies led by Johor police carried out massive raids since the beginning of the year.
- 7 January – Four enforcement officers from the Pahang Land and Mines Office were detained by the Malaysian Anti-Corruption Commission (MACC) for allegedly accepting bribes from illegal bauxite-mining operators.
- 11 January
  - Prime Minister Mohammad Najib Abdul Razak and former MCA president Ling Liong Sik are attempting mediation to resolve a defamation suit linked to the RM2.6 billion donation issue.
  - Muallim become the 11th district of Perak.
  - Two Malaysians suicide bombers blew themselves up, killing more than 33 others during their assigned missions in Syria and Iraq last week.
  - A book on the Trans-Pacific Partnership Agreement (TPPA) is launched as part of efforts to enhance the public's understanding over its implementation.
- 12 January – The MEASAT satellite celebrates its 20th anniversary.
- 13 January – Terengganu officially declared it is hit by a dengue outbreak.
- 14 January – The 40th anniversary of the death of the 2nd Prime Minister of Malaysia, Tun Abdul Razak Hussein.
- 14 January – 2016 Jakarta attacks:
  - At least six killed after armed men carried out a series of apparently coordinated gun and bomb attacks in Jakarta, Indonesia.
    - Wisma Putra confirms that there are no Malaysians affected by the Jakarta bomb explosions.
    - Police have raised the alert level in Malaysia to the highest degree following today's attacks in Jakarta.
    - Malaysia strongly condemns the attacks in Jakarta which claimed the lives of several innocent lives. Malaysia expressed its deepest sympathies and heartfelt condolences to the families of innocent people who were killed or injured in the attacks.
- 15 January – Tunku Alif Hussein Saifuddin Al-Amin, 3rd and youngest son of the current Yang di-Pertuan Besar of Negeri Sembilan, Tuanku Muhriz died at the age of 31 due to illness. His body was laid to rest at the Seri Menanti Royal Mausoleum in Seri Menanti, Negeri Sembilan.
- 16 January
  - A man suspected of having links to the Islamic State of Iraq and Syria (ISIS) is detained by Malaysian police at the Jelatek LRT station in Ampang.
  - National explorer Shahrom Abdullah successfully completed a Malaysian Seven Contingents Exploration Club (KE7B) expedition to reach the South Pole in a record 37 days.
  - Johor and Selangor police increased their presence at public places following the terrorist attacks in Jakarta, in line with a statement from Inspector General of Police, Khalid Abu Bakar that the security alert had been raised to the highest level.
- 17 January – Police have arrested a 28-year-old insurance agent who planned to carry out a lone wolf suicide bomb attack in Malaysia, in the wake of the terrorist attack by Islamic State (IS) militants in Jakarta, Indonesia on 14 January.
- 19 January – The National Security Council (NSC) has decided to raise the sensitivity level of the country's security and increase joint police-military patrols at tourist and public areas.
- 21 January – Mukhriz Mahathir lost the support and confidence of Kedah UMNO as Menteri Besar of Kedah and state party chief, with division leaders citing his weak leadership as reason that he must be replaced.
- 23 January – An estimated 4,000 protesters rallied in Kuala Lumpur in a last-ditch attempt to stop Malaysia from joining the Trans-Pacific Partnership (TPP) Agreement that will be voted on in Parliament next week.
- 24 January – The first anniversary of the Malaysia Airlines Flight MH370 crash:
  - A piece of suspected plane wreckage has been found off the coast of southern Thailand, a local official said, prompting speculation it might belong to Malaysia Airlines Flight MH370, which vanished nearly two years ago.
- 24 January – Police have detained seven people believed to be linked to the Islamic State (IS) group.
- 25 January – 5 February – 2016 Sukipt Games in University of Technology Malaysia.
- 27 January – The motion to decide on Malaysia's participation in the Trans-Pacific Partnership Agreement (TPPA) has been passed in the Dewan Rakyat.
- 28 January – The 2016 Federal Budget recalibration highlights:
  - To increase the people's discretionary income to cope with the rising cost of living, the Government has agreed to lower the employees' contribution to Employee's Provident Fund (EPF) by 3% beginning March 2016 to December 2017. Contribution by employers will remain at 12% (for employees earning above RM5,000) and 13% (for employees earning RM5,000 and below). The new rate means employees have the option of contributing only 8% of their salary to EPF. This is expected to increase private sector spending by RM8 billion a year.
  - However, for taxpayers, the additional discretionary income they get from this will still be taxed.
  - The Federal Agricultural Marketing Authority (FAMA) will establish markets or MyFarm Outlets that sell agricultural produce directly such as fish, poultry, meat, vegetables and fruits at prices between 5% and 20% below market prices. These outlets will be established in 11 locations, the first location being Precinct 7, Putrajaya in March.
  - The Government will liberalise Approved Permits (Aps) for eight agricultural products including coffee beans and meats. This will ensure consistency of supplies for these items.
  - The Ministry of Domestic Trade, Co-operatives and Consumerism (MDTCC) to identify more fair price shops, including foreign and local hypermarkets, and increase the number of these shops from 640 to 1,000 this year.
  - According to Senator Datuk Seri Abdul Wahid Omar, Malaysia's poverty rate went down to 0.6% last year from 1.7% in 2012. These hardcore poor households may be struggling to cope with the increasing cost of living, hence the MyBeras programme will be introduced where 20 kg of rice will be distributed to these households every month until December 2016.
  - All new housing projects priced up to RM300,000 will be limited to first-time house buyers only, with immediate effect.
  - The Government will organise Integrated House Ownership Expo Roadshows, which will offer more than 100,000 housing units under programmes like the National Housing Department (JPN), 1Malaysia People Housing Programme (PR1MA), Syarikat Perumahan Negara Berhad (SPNB), and Perumahan Penjawat Awam 1Malaysia (PPA1M).
  - For houses priced at RM35,000 under the People's Housing Programme (Projek Perumahan Rakyat or PPR), the Government will offer a financing package at 4% through Bank Simpanan Nasional (BSN) and Bank Rakyat. This will benefit more than 10,000 house owners.
  - The middle-income earners are not left behind in this revision with the reintroduction of the special tax relief of RM2,000 for individual taxpayers with a monthly income of RM8,000 or below. This is valid for the Year of Assessment 2015 and will benefit two million taxpayers. This was last introduced for Year of Assessment 2013.
  - The National Scholarship Programme for 20 top SPM students to pursue study at renowned universities globally.
  - The Special Engineering Programme for 200 students to Japan, Korea, Germany and France.
  - The Bursary Graduate Programme for 744 students to pursue undergraduate studies in public universities and private institutions of higher learning in the country.
  - The new intake of 8,000 students will be awarded scholarships to pursue undergraduate studies in the country.
  - RM5 billion will be allocated for the National Higher Education Fund (PTPTN) for undergraduates,
  - MyBrain15, Academic Training Scheme for Bumiputera (SLAB) and Academic Training Scheme of Public Higher Education Institutions (SLAI) programmes will be continued to intensify investment in human capital,
  - Increase the students from 25,000 overall to: 15,000 new students for the MyMaster programme, 5,000 for MyPhD, and 300 for SLAI. These programmes will be given an additional allocation of RM300 million.
  - The promotion of domestic tourism will be intensified through organising sales of integrated domestic holiday packages.
  - The Government will facilitate the entry of foreign tourists by expediting the implementation of eVisa to several countries which have been identified.
  - Tourists from China will not require a visa to visit Malaysia from 1 March to 31 December 2016 (for a period of stay not exceeding 15 days).
    - Double compliance and auditing efforts on tax evaders,
    - Special consideration for penalty on tax evaders to encourage them to come forward and declare their past years' income if tax arrears are settled before 31 December 2016,
    - For duty-free islands, the Government will restructure the selling channel of cigarettes and liquors limited to duty-free outlets licensed by the Royal Malaysian Customs Department (RMCD). This is expected to reduce revenue loss of up to RM1 billion,
    - Free duty treatment on imported vehicles in duty-free islands will be tightened,
    - The Government will optimise the revenue from the telecommunication spectrum through a redistribution and bidding process which will be implemented soon, and
    - Develop several strategic areas owned by the Government through a bidding process to invigorate economic activity.
    - Government will exercise prudent spending on supplies and services and to continue with grant rationalisation. However, the measures were not specified in the Budget 2016 recalibration announcement.
    - The development budget will focus on projects and programmes that place the people first, have high multiplier effect and low import content.
    - Physical projects (including construction of affordable houses, hospitals, schools, roads, public transport and security) to be prioritised. Non-physical projects and projects still under study to be rescheduled. This is expected to reduce cash flow commitments up to RM5 billion.
- 28 January – Ola Bola, Malaysia's first sports film has released in cinemas. Directed by Chiu Keng Guan. The film tells about the glories of Malaysia national football team which successfully entered the 1980 Summer Olympics.

=== February ===
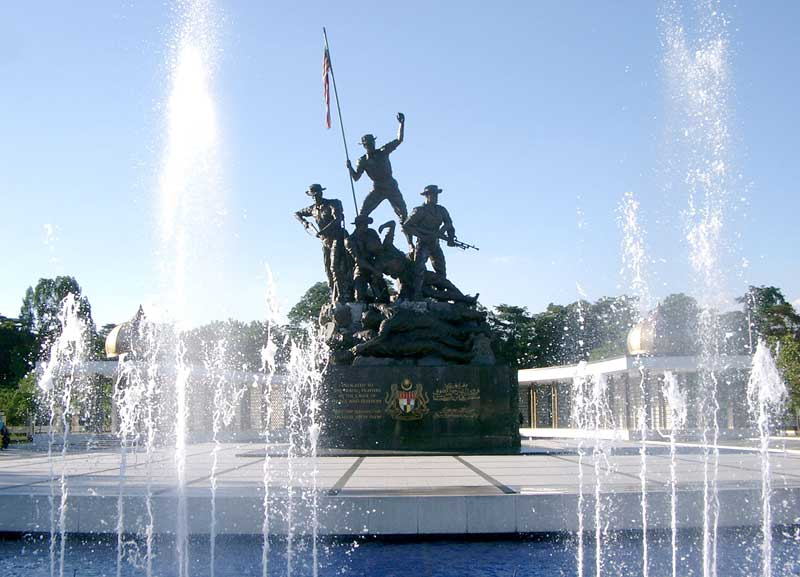
Tugu Negara, the Malaysian National Monument turns 50 in Kuala Lumpur, Malaysia.

- 1 February
  - FinanceAsia has named Prime Minister Mohammad Najib Abdul Razak as the worst finance minister in 2016.
  - The retail price of RON95 and RON97 petrol and diesel reduced by 10 sen, 20 sen and 25 sen respectively.
- 3 February
  - Mukhriz Mahathir is relinquish his post as Menteri Besar of Kedah.
  - Ahmad Bashah Md Hanipah resigns as a Deputy Minister of Domestic Trade, Cooperation and Consumerism and Senator.
- 4 February
  - Ahmad Bashah Md Hanipah is sworn in as a new Menteri Besar of Kedah.
  - Twelve countries including Malaysia have officially signed the Trans-Pacific Partnership Agreement (TPPA) in Auckland, New Zealand.
- 8 February – The Tugu Negara (National Monument) celebrates its 50th anniversary.
- 10 February – Dead whale found at Pantai Rambah near Pontian, Johor.
- 13 February – Sabah police arrested 520 individuals in a massive joint operation to weed out criminal elements at one of the biggest settlements for immigrants in the state. Six of those arrested, including a woman, are nabbed for investigation under the Security Offences (Special Measure) Act 2012.
- 16 February – Proton Holdings Berhad recalls almost 100,000 units of its Exora, Prevé and Suprima S models to fix the CFE oil cooler hoses.
- 18 February – Former MCA president Ling Liong Sik spared no bullets in his attack on Prime Minister Mohammad Najib Abdul Razak.
- 19 February – Government has suspended the recruitment of all foreign workers, including those from Bangladesh, pending a review of the levy and rehiring programme.
- 21–28 February – Several parts of Sarawak were hit by flash floods.
- 21 February – A lorry driver rammed his heavy vehicle into 22 cars and two motorcycles to drive through the congested area near the Taman Berjaya market, Nibong Tebal, Penang, causing all the smaller vehicles to be badly damaged. On 23 February, a lorry driver, G Mathan finally surrendered to the police. He pleaded not guilty by the Jawi Magistrate's court.
- 25 February – The Malaysian Insider website has been blocked by the Malaysian Communications and Multimedia Commission (MCMC) as it violates the law.
- 26 February
  - Prime Minister Mohammad Najib Abdul Razak's Facebook page was awash with angry vibes as thousands of netizens went on an emoji rampage.
  - A Royal Malaysian Air Force (RMAF) CN-235 makes its emergency landing and crashed near the coast of Kuala Selangor, Selangor. All eight crew members survive the crash. Meanwhile, a fisherman drowned in his attempt to rescue the survivors of the CN-235 crash. On 27 November, RMAF has set up an Investigation Board Team to look into the incident of an CN-235 aircraft emergency landing at the Kuala Selangor coast.
  - UMNO suspended Muhyiddin Yassin as deputy president owing to his continued open criticism of the party leadership.
- 29 February – Former Prime Minister Mahathir Mohamad and his wife Siti Hasmah Mohamad Ali quits UMNO party.

=== March ===
- 1 March
  - The RON 95 reduced at RM1.60 per litre (15 sen down compared to February), RON 97 at RM1.95 per litre (10 sen down), diesel at RM1.35 per litre (unchanged) and EURO 5 diesel at RM1.45 (unchanged).
  - Majlis Amanah Rakyat (MARA) celebrates its 50th anniversary.
  - Malaysian Aviation Commission (MAVCOM) officially established under the Malaysian Aviation Commission Act 2015 as an independent entity to regulate economic and commercial matters related to civil aviation in Malaysia.
- 2 March – The first anniversary of the Malaysia Airlines Flight MH370 crash:
  - Media report the discovery of an object, found on a sandbar in Mozambique, that may have originated from a Boeing 777-2H6ER of the Malaysia Airlines Flight MH370. The object, found by an American tourist the preceding weekend, will be flown to Australia for examination.
- 3 March – The first feature film of popular local children's animated TV series BoBoiBoy: The Movie has made it into the Malaysian Book of Records for raking in more than RM 500,000 in ticket sales on the first day of its release.
- 4 March – Former Prime Minister, Mahathir Mohamad and longtime political enemies, opposition leaders and civil society signs the Malaysian Citizens' Declaration to demand Prime Minister Mohammad Najib Abdul Razak's resignation from office.
- 6 March – The groundbreaking ceremony of the Johor Forest City in Iskandar Malaysia, Johor by the Sultan Ibrahim. The project will be duty-free status.
- 8 March – The second anniversary of the Malaysia Airlines Flight MH370 crash.
- 9 March – A partial solar eclipse occurred in Malaysia.
- 11 March – Former Prime Minister, Mahathir Mohamad terminated as a Petronas advisor by the Mohammad Najib Abdul Razak's cabinet. The decision is made following his recent actions which are contrary to the country's laws and constitution.
- 13 March – More than 20 vehicles belonging to spectators of the Super League football match between Johor Darul Ta'zim (JDT) and the police (PDRM) at Hang Jebat Stadium were badly damaged after being rammed into by a trailer at Lebuh SPA highway, Malacca.
- 16 March – The Warisan Merdeka project has been officially launched by Prime Minister Mohammad Najib Abdul Razak. The 118-storey building will be known as PNB118. The project will be undertaken by the country's largest fund management company, Permodalan Nasional Berhad (PNB), and is expected to be completed in 2024.
- 17 March – Award-winning action heroine Michelle Yeoh has been appointed as a United Nations Development Programme (UNDP) Goodwill Ambassador.
- 18 March – The Malaysian Palm Oil Council (MPOC) has condemned the vote in the French National Assembly to impose a discriminatory tax on palm oil produced in the developing world, especially Indonesia and Malaysia.
- 21 March – All schools in Perlis and Kedah are ordered to close for two days due to extreme hot and dry weather.
- 25 March – Former Prime Minister, Abdullah Ahmad Badawi is appointed as a new Petronas advisor effective 1 April replacing Mahathir Mohamad.
- 29 March
  - Taxi drivers staged a protest in Bukit Bintang, Kuala Lumpur as they were protesting against Uber and GrabCar. Later, police have detained five taxi drivers who took part in a protest against Uber and Grabcar in Bukit Bintang.
  - Negeri Sembilan's Undang Luak of Johol, Datuk Mohd Jan Abdul Ghani is sacked from his post.
- 31 March
  - Opening of the Ampang Line extension (Stage 2) from Kinrara to Puchong.
  - Former Prime Minister, Mahathir Mohamad resigns as a Proton chairman.
  - Socio-political activist and writer, Marina Mahathir received the Legion of Honour award from the French government.

=== April ===
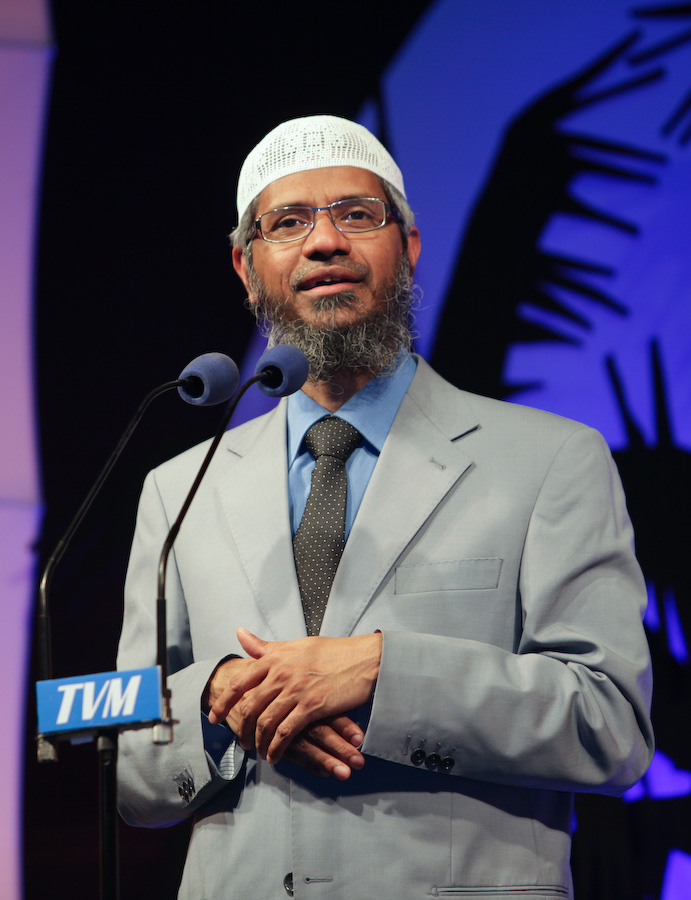
Zakir Naik, an Indian Muslim preacher.

- 1 April
  - The RON95 increased at RM1.70 per litre (10 sen higher from the current price) while RON97 increased at RM2.05 (10 sen higher).
  - State broadcaster Radio Televisyen Malaysia (RTM) celebrates its 70th anniversary.
  - Four crewmen from a Malaysian boat are kidnapped by armed Filipino gunmen near Ligitan Island off Semporna in the east coast of Sabah.
- 2 April – Former Prime Minister, Mahathir Mohamad arrived the anti-Goods and Services Tax (GST) rally organised by Pakatan Harapan which also demands for the resignation of Prime Minister Mohd Najib Abdul Razak.
- 3 April – Malaysian Moto3 rookie rider, Khairul Idham Pawi wins the Moto3 Argentine motorcycle Grand Prix. It is the first Malaysian to win podium in the world motorcycle championship.
- 4 April – 2016 Southeast Asian haze:
  - A total of 77 schools in three districts in Sabah are closed due to the haze.
- 5 April – Parti Keadilan Rakyat (PKR) vice president and also Pandan Member of Parliament, Rafizi Ramli was arrested in front of the Parliament House for the alleged wrongful communication of classified documents. He was arrested under Section 8 of the Official Secrets Acts (OSA), which relates to wrongful communication of an official secret.
- 7 April – The giant baby panda which was born in Zoo Negara seven months ago is named "Nuan Nuan" (friendly).
- 9 April – Rayani Air suspended its operations temporarily in order to restructure the airline's management.
- 11 April
  - All 259 schools in Perlis, as well as the districts of Jerantut and Temerloh in Pahang, have been ordered by the Ministry of Education to close for a day due to extreme hot weather.
  - Police barred Indian Muslim preacher, Zakir Naik from giving a lecture at Universiti Teknikal Malaysia Melaka (UTeM) in Ayer Keroh, Malacca on 17 April. However, he will be allowed to go on as the topic has been changed.
- 15 April – Nearly 40,000 people attended an Indian Muslim preacher, Zakir Naik's final lecture in Padang Astaka, Kemaman, Terengganu. Meanwhile, a Christian girl, Wu Nina Grace converted to Islam after attending Zakir's final lecture in Padang Astaka.
- 16 April – Nearly 30,000 people attended an Indian Muslim preacher, Zakir Naik's lecture at the National Hockey Stadium in Bukit Jalil, Kuala Lumpur.
- 17 April – More than 20,000 people thronged the main hall of the Universiti Teknikal Malaysia Melaka (UTeM) in Ayer Keroh, Malacca to listen to Zakir Naik entitled 'Islam - Problems and Solutions to Humanity'.
- 22 April – TV9 celebrates its 10th anniversary.
- 23 April – Chief Minister of Sarawak, Adenan Satem declares Sarawak Day as a public holiday for the state on 22 July.
- 25 April – The Sultan was revoked 'Datuk Seri' title for Menteri Besar of Terengganu Datuk Seri Ahmad Razif Abdul Rahman.
- 27 April – Senior deputy Bank Negara Malaysia governor Muhammad Ibrahim has been appointed as a governor of the nation's central bank replacing Zeti Akhtar Aziz effective on 1 May.
- 28 April – High jumper, Nauraj Singh Randhawa shattered the national record to qualify for the Rio de Janeiro 2016 Summer Olympic Games after winning gold at the Singapore Open.

=== May ===
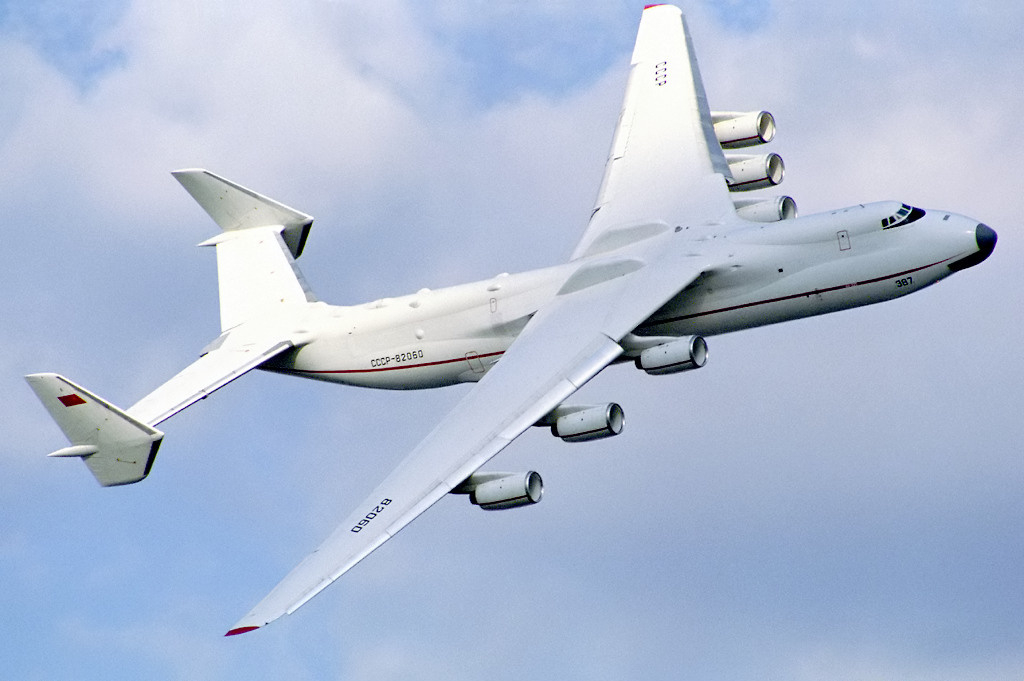
Antonov An-225 Mriya.

- 1 May
  - Senior deputy Bank Negara Malaysia governor Muhammad Ibrahim has been appointed as a governor of the nation's central bank replacing Zeti Akhtar Aziz.
  - Malaysian no.1 badminton ace, Lee Chong Wei wins the Badminton Asia Championships in Wuhan, China after beating Chen Long, 21–17, 15–21, 21–13 in the final.
- 5 May – A helicopter, believed to be ferrying VIPs, including a deputy minister, from Betong to Kuching, Sarawak, has gone missing from radar near the Sebuyau district. Among those believed to be onboard are: Plantation Industries and Commodities Deputy Minister Noriah Kasnon, Noriah's husband Asmuni Abdullah, Kuala Kangsar Member of Parliament Wan Mohammad Khair-il Anuar Wan Ahmad, Plantation Industries and Commodities Ministry secretary-general Sundaran Annamalai and Noriah's bodyguard Ahmad Sobri Harun.
  - Defence Minister, Hishamuddin Hussein has directed the Royal Malaysian Air Force (RMAF) and the Malaysian Army to mount a search and rescue operation to locate the missing helicopter.
- 6 May – 2016 Sebuyau helicopter crash:
  - Deputy Plantation Industries and Commodities Minister Noriah Kasnon has been identified as the first victim of a helicopter crash.
  - Noriah Kasnon's remains was flown back to Selangor and was laid to rest at the Muslim Cemetery in Batu 12 Sungai Burong, Sabak Bernam.
- 7 May – 2016 Sebuyau helicopter crash:
  - The second body recovered from the helicopter crash has been identified as Sundaran Annamalai.
- 7 May – 11th Sarawak state election:
  - Barisan Nasional (BN) wins a two-thirds majority in the election. BN secured a 72-seat majority in the 82-strong state assembly in the election. Adenan Satem is sworn in as a Chief Minister.
- 8 May – 2016 Sebuyau helicopter crash:
  - The fourth and fifth bodies recovered from the Batang Lupar river in Sarawak have been identified as belonging to Kuala Kangsar Member of Parliament Wan Mohammad Khair-il Anuar Wan Ahmad, and Noriah Kasnon's husband Asmuni Abdullah.
  - Wan Mohammad Khair-il Anuar's remains was flown back to Perak and was laid to rest at Al-Ghufran Royal Mausoleum near Ubudiah Mosque, Kuala Kangsar, Perak.
- 9 May – KTM Intercity's popular train service Ekspres Rakyat (Butterworth - KL Sentral - JB Sentral - Woodlands, Singapore) has ceased its operations after 40 years in service.
- 11 May – UMNO celebrates its 70th anniversary of the foundation.
- 12 May – Several parts of Kuala Lumpur including Jalan Tuanku Abdul Halim and Jalan Bangsar were hit by flash floods.
- 14 May
  - The world's largest aircraft, Antonov An-225 Mriya landed at the Kuala Lumpur International Airport (KLIA).
  - Johor Darul Ta'zim FC wins Malaysian FA Cup for the first time after beating PKNS FC 2–1 in the final. Johor declares a public holiday on 15 May following JDT's victory.
- 15 May – Malaysian superbike rider, Zulfahmi Khairuddin wins second place of the 2016 Motul Superbike FIM World Championship at Sepang International Circuit.
- 17 May
  - A Royal Malaysian Air Force (RMAF) training aircraft, Aermacchi MB339CM crash in a paddy field in Nenasi, Pahang. Two crewmen ejected to safety prior to the crash.
  - More than 30 people were evacuated from a commercial aircraft at the Sultan Abdul Aziz Shah Airport in Subang, Selangor following a bomb threat.
- 18 May – A new prefix of registration number - "F" and "V" — will be assigned for the Federal Territories of Putrajaya and Kuala Lumpur vehicles in June and July respectively.
- 20 May – The second anniversary of the Malaysia Airlines Flight MH370 crash:
  - The massive search for Malaysia Airlines flight MH370 in the remote southern Indian Ocean is expected to be completed by early August.
- 21 May – The remains of 32 Australian citizens buried in the Commonwealth War Graves Commission in Camp Terendak, Malacca were exhumed.
- 22 May
  - A freak highway crash occurred at the North–South Expressway Southern Route, near the Simpang Ampat Interchange in Alor Gajah, Malacca. The attitude of some Malaysians during an accident at the expressway toll exit has sparked uproar among netizens for using the emergency lane, which allegedly led to the death of two motorists. The selfish needs of some drivers, who blocked the emergency lane, delayed the first ambulance by an hour and the second by almost three hours to get to the accident victims.
  - Fatin Nuraisya Mohd Hanipha, a lawyer from Kelantan wins first Clever Girl Malaysia after beating finalist Arina Mohd Farin Lum from Selangor.
- 31 May – The remains of 32 Australian citizens that were buried in the Commonwealth War Graves Commission in Camp Terendak, Malacca have been flown home to Australia.

=== June ===
- 1 June
  - Astro celebrates its 20th anniversary of the direct broadcast satellite (DBS) Pay TV service.
  - The sale of alcoholic beverages will be restricted to non-Muslim above 21 years of age from the current 18 starting 1 January 2017.
  - Syed Alman Zain Syed Alwi, son in law of Deputy Prime Minister, Ahmad Zahid Hamidi died after while receiving treatment at a dental clinic in Bangsar, Kuala Lumpur.
- 4 June – Late Plantation Industries and Commodities Deputy Minister, Noriah Kasnon and UMNO Wanita chief, Shahrizat Abdul Jalil received the Panglima Setia Mahkota (PSM), which carries the title "Tan Sri" from the 14th Yang di-Pertuan Agong, Sultan Abdul Halim Mu'adzam Shah of Kedah.
- 5 June
  - Malaysian badminton ace, Lee Chong Wei wins his sixth Indonesia Open after beating 5th seed Jan Ø. Jørgensen of Denmark, 17–21, 21–19, 21–17 in the final.
  - Malaysia Airlines Flight MH1 Airbus A380 aircraft en route to Kuala Lumpur from London experience clear-air turbulence over Bay of Bengal which left several passengers and crew members injured.
- 7 June – The National Security Council Act 2016 was gazetted as a security law.
- 15 June – A businessman was shot dead by two professional killer at Federal Highway near Sungai Rasau toll plaza
- 18 June – The Land Public Transport Commission (SPAD) submits proposal to legalise Uber and Grab under the Taxi Industry Transformation Programme.
- 18 June – The Sungai Besar and Kuala Kangsar parliamentary by-election: Barisan Nasional (BN) wins both by-elections.
  - In Sungai Besar, Selangor. BN candidate, Budiman Mohd Zohdi wins this by-election with a majority of 9.191 votes beating Dr Abdul Rahman Osman from Pan Malaysian Islamic Party (PAS) and Azhar Abdul Shukur from Parti Amanah Negara (PAN).
  - In Kuala Kangsar, Perak. BN candidate, Mastura Mohd Yazid wins this by-elections with a majority of 6,969 votes beating Dr Najihatussalehah Ahmad from PAS, Dr Ahmad Termizi Ramli from PAN and Independent candidate, Izat Bukhary Ismail Bukhary.
- 20 June – Petaling Jaya celebrates its 10th anniversary of the city status.
- 21 June – Parti Keadilan Rakyat (PKR) secretary in Miri, Bill Kayong is assassinated in Miri, Sarawak.
- 24 June – Two UMNO deputy president, Muhyiddin Yassin and Mukhriz Mahathir are sacked from the party. UMNO vice president, Shafie Apdal has been suspended from the party.
- 26 June – Semporna UMNO division vice-chief Jaujan Sambakong, leader of three wings and 300 branch chief have quit the party following Shafie Apdal's suspension.
- 27 June – Ahmad Husni Hanadzlah has resigned from all his Barisan Nasional (BN) and UMNO positions after stepping down as second Finance Minister.
- 28 June – The 2016 Movida Bar grenade attack:
  - A hand grenade attack at the Movida night club at Puchong, Selangor. Eight people are injured. Police later investigate links to Malaysians fighting for ISIL.
- 30 June – Chief Minister of Penang, Lim Guan Eng charged with two counts of corruption charges involving a piece of land and a bungalow and with using his position's gratification.

=== July ===
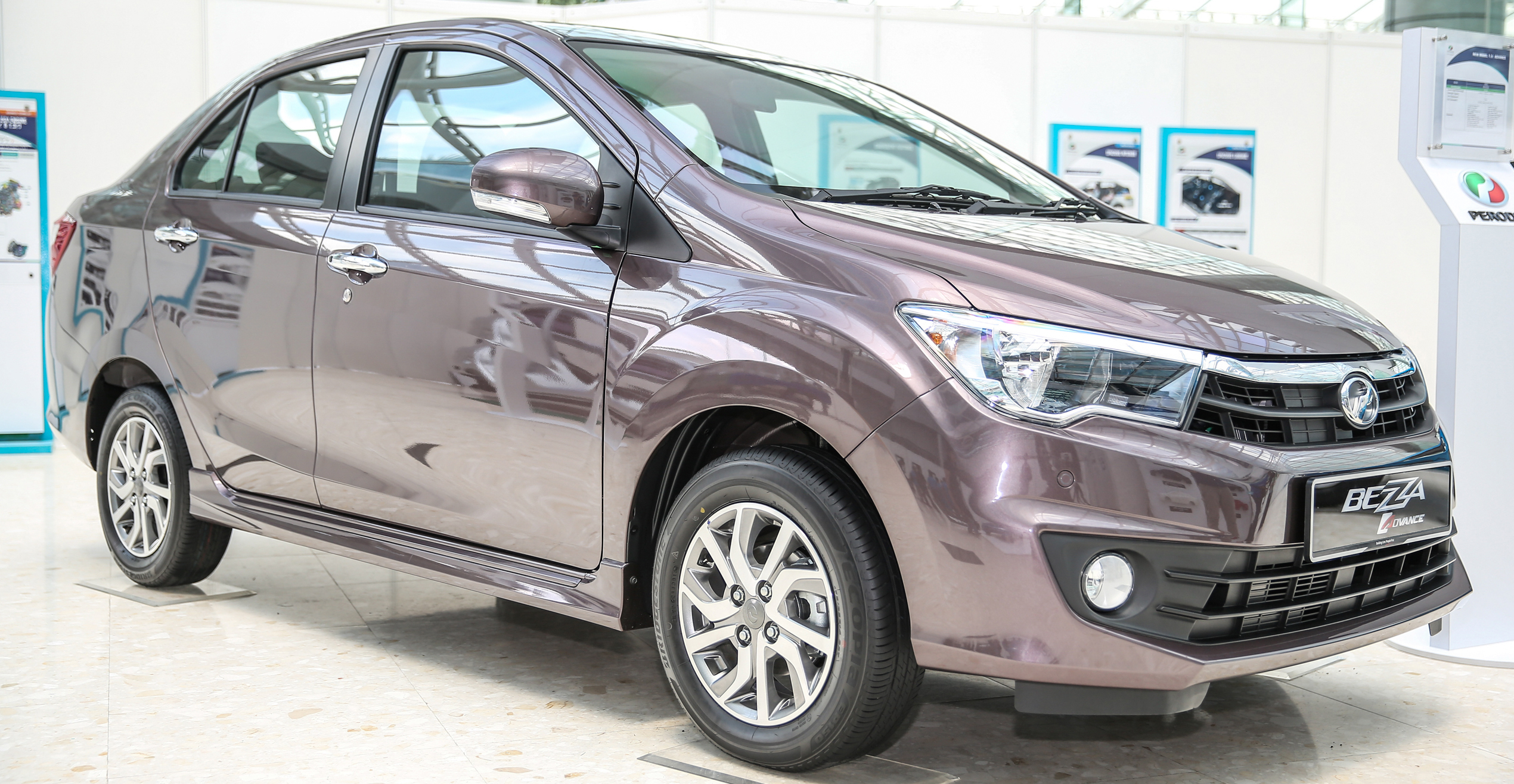
Perodua Bezza, Perodua's first sedan.

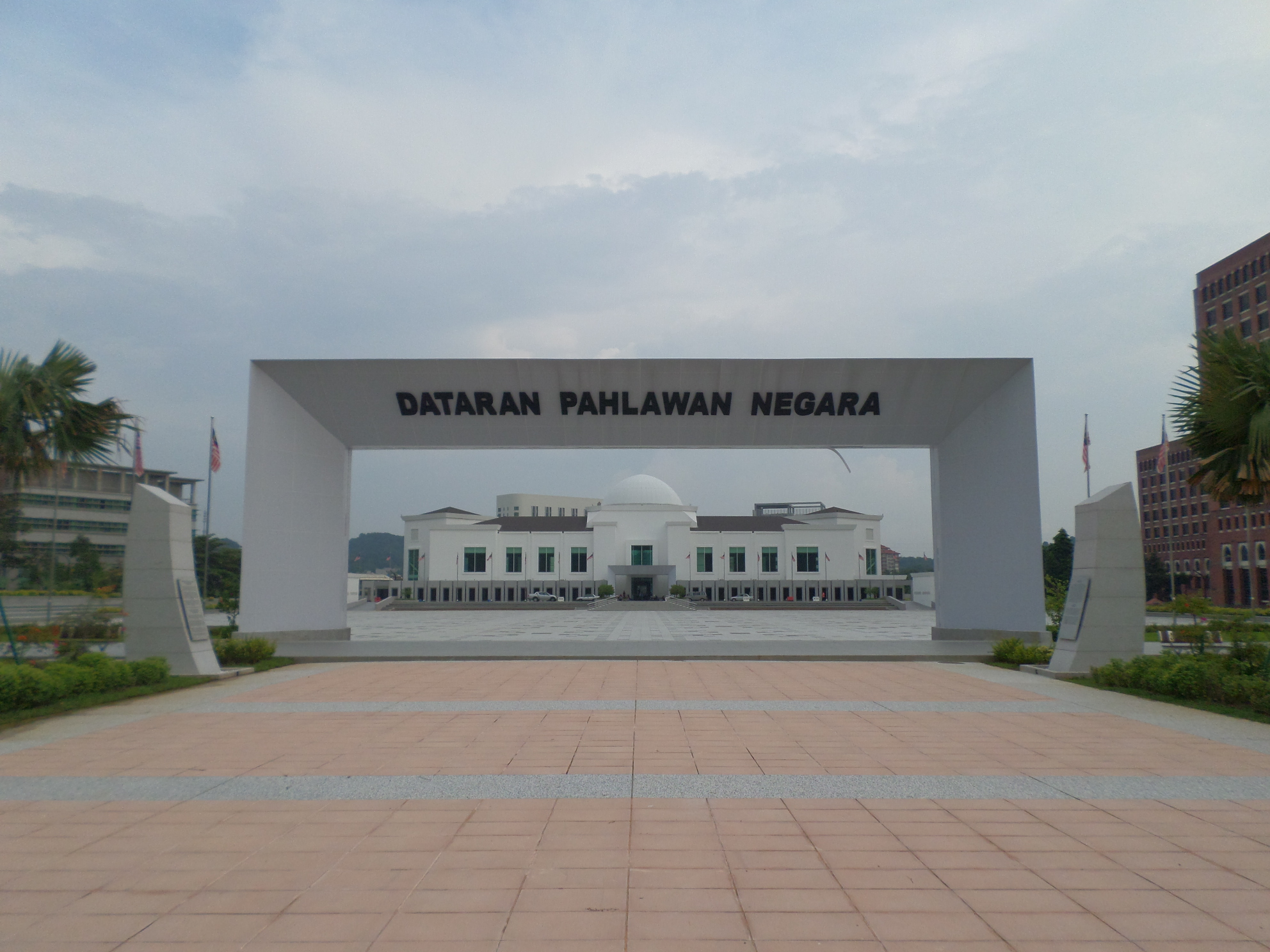
National Heroes Square, Putrajaya, Malaysia.

- 1 July
  - The RON95 increased at RM1.75 per litre (5 sen higher than the current price) while RON97 increased at RM2.10 (5 sen higher).
  - The RM1,000 minimum wage for Peninsular Malaysia and RM920 for Sabah, Sarawak and the Federal Territory of Labuan, has come into effect. This marked a RM100 (11 per cent) increase for the peninsula, and a RM120 (15 per cent) increase for Sabah, Sarawak and Labuan.
  - Sultan Ibrahim of Johor wins "F1" vehicle number plate worth RM836,660.
- 4 July – UMNO's vice-president, Shafie Apdal, quits the party following his suspension.
- 4 July – 2016 Movida Bar grenade attack:
  - Police confirm that the attack of the Movida night club in Puchong, Selangor on 28 June was the first ever successful Islamic State (IS) attack on Malaysian soil.
- 6 July
  - FELDA celebrates its 60th anniversary.
  - Woman is killed, daughter critically injured in a shooting at Taman OUG, Kuala Lumpur. The victims was identified as Datin Renyce Wong Siew Ling, an estate agent.
- 10 July
  - Three Indonesians are kidnapped by five armed men off Lahad Datu, Sabah.
  - An express bus rammed with 10 other vehicles at North–South Expressway between Menora Tunnel and Jelapang near Ipoh, Perak.
- 13 July – Four in a family are gunned down by a 32-year-old gunman at the chicken processing factory in Batu Maung, Penang. On 14 July, a gunman, Chung Chun Wah, was shot down by police at George Town.
- 14 July – Former Prime Minister, Mahathir Mohamad announced a new opposition coalition, comprising a soon-to-be-formed party, Parti Keadilan Rakyat (PKR), Democratic Action Party (DAP) and Parti Amanah Negara (Amanah). which will be set up to fight Barisan Nasional (BN) in the next general election.
- 15 July – 2016 Nice truck attack:
  - Terror attack in Nice, France. A Malaysian student injured in the terror attack was hit by the side of the 19-tonne truck that rammed into a crowd of revellers at a Bastille celebration and killed at least 84 people.
- 15 July – Two semiconductor giants, Western Digital and Seagate Technology ceased its factories in Bayan Lepas, Penang after 28 years in operation.
- 17 July – Malaysian Moto 3 rider, Khairul Idham Pawi wins German Motorcycle Grand Prix.
- 18 July
  - The High Court in Kuala Lumpur dismissed Mahathir Mohamad's affidavit in support of former MCA president Ling Liong Sik's application to strike out Prime Minister Mohammad Najib Abdul Razak's suit.
  - The Magistrate's Court in Alor Gajah, Malacca fined 20 road users between RM1,000 and RM2,000 for driving on the emergency lanes at the North–South Expressway between Ayer Keroh and Simpang Ampat.
- 19 July – Malaysia and Singapore signed a Memorandum of Understanding (MoU) for the Kuala Lumpur–Singapore high-speed rail (HSR) projects.
- 21 July – Perodua's first sedan, Perodua Bezza is launched.
- 22 July – Sarawak Day becomes as an official public holiday in Sarawak.
- 23–31 July – 2016 Sukma Games was held at the Sarawak Stadium in Kuching, Sarawak.
- 23 July – Police anti-terrorist operatives arrested 14 suspected Islamic State (IS) militants and seized an improvised explosive device (IED) in a series of interstate operations recently.
- 24 July – Tun Mustapha Marine Park, Malaysia's largest marine park in Kudat, Sabah is officially launched.
- 25 July
  - American singer, Selena Gomez performed her concert at Malawati Stadium, Shah Alam, Selangor.
  - Bagan Datoh becomes Perak's 12th district.
- 27 July – Malaccan sprinter Khairul Hafiz Jantan is officially Malaysia's fastest ever sprinter after winning the 2016 Sukma Games 100m gold medal, obliterating Watson Nyambek's national record in a blistering 10.18 seconds at the Sarawak Stadium in Kuching, Sarawak.
- 29 July
  - Former cabinet minister Tan Sri Abdul Wahid Omar has been appointed as the new chairman of Pemodalan Nasional Berhad (PNB) replacing Tun Ahmad Sarji Abdul Hamid.
  - Dato' Dzulkifli Ahmad has been appointed as the new Malaysian Anti-Corruption Commission (MACC) chief commissioner replacing Tan Sri Abu Kassim Mohamed.
- 31 July – The Hari Pahlawan (Heroes' Day) celebration is held at the National Heroes Square, Putrajaya, Malaysia for the first time.

=== August ===
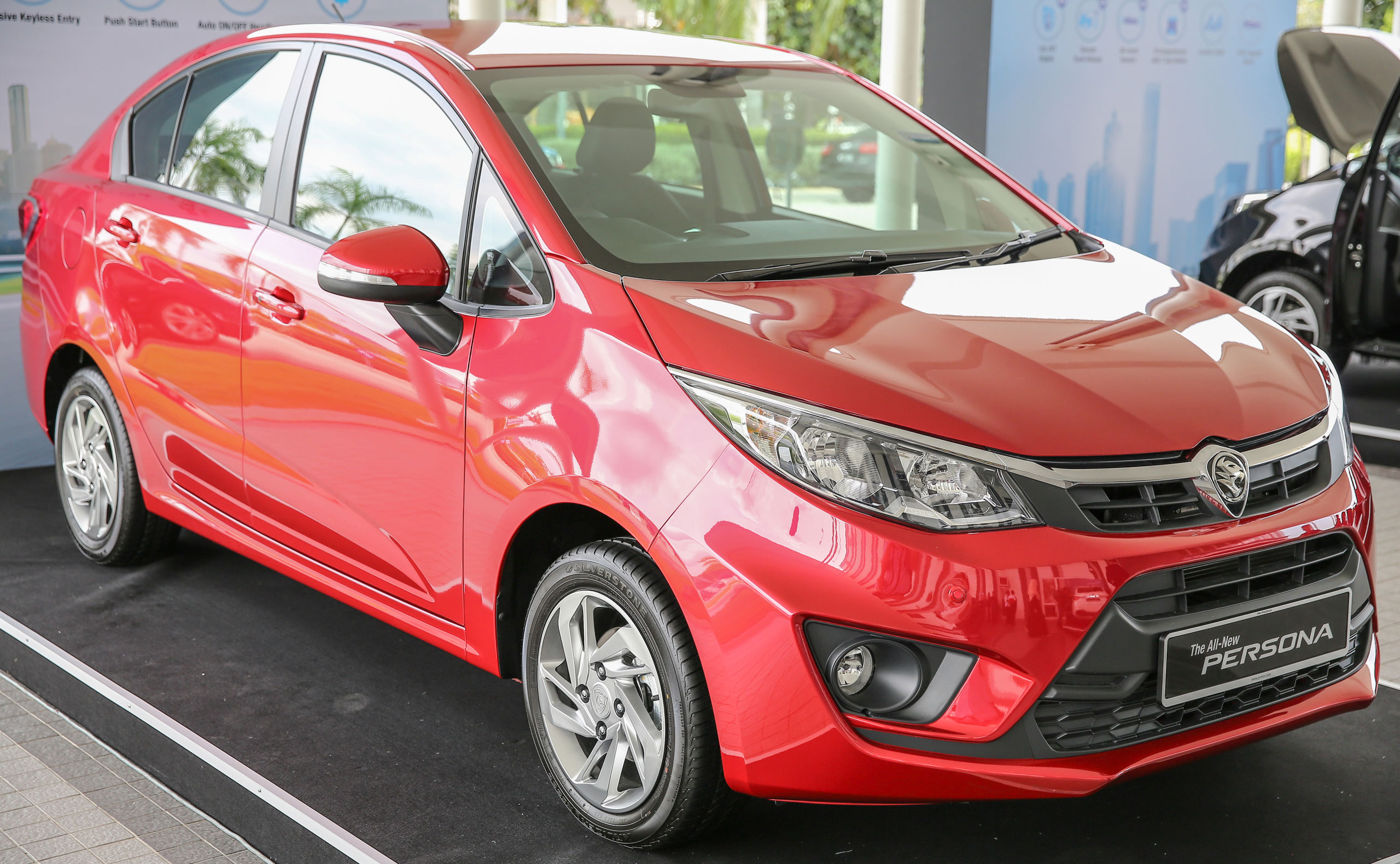
Proton Persona second generation.

- 1 August – The diesel price increased by 10 sen and the RON 95 and RON 97 price remain unchanged.
- 5 August – The Federal Territories Islamic Committee issued the fatwa that Pokémon Go is forbidden to all Muslims in Malaysia.
- 5–21 August – Athletes from Malaysia completed at the 2016 Summer Olympics in Rio de Janeiro, Brazil.
- 6 August – Pokémon Go, a record-setting augmented reality game, is officially released in Malaysia.
- 9 August –2016 Summer Olympics in Rio de Janeiro, Brazil:
  - Two Malaysian divers Cheong Jun Hoong and Pandelela Rinong win their first silver medal.
- 12 August
  - Malaysia withdraws as a host of FIFA Congress 2017.
  - A 36-year-old medical doctor attached to a dental clinic in Bangsar, Dr. Ting Teck Ching was charged at the Sessions Court in Kuala Lumpur with causing the death of Syed Alman Zain Syed Ali, the son-in-law of Deputy Prime Minister, Ahmad Zahid Hamidi.
- 16 August –2016 Summer Olympics in Rio de Janeiro, Brazil:
  - Malaysian track cyclist, Azizulhasni Awang wins bronze medal for Malaysia in the keirin.
- 17 August – Suzuki Motorcycles closed its assembly plants in Malaysia due to lack demand.
- 17 August – 2016 Summer Olympics in Rio de Janeiro, Brazil:
  - Malaysian mixed doubles, Chan Peng Soon and Goh Liu Ying wins silver medal in the badminton.
- 18 August – A five-year-old boy, Noor Amila Edrus Norsham who went missing from a surau near his home in Jinjang, Kuala Lumpur was found dead along the Kemensah river in Ulu Kelang, Selangor.
- 19 August – 2016 Summer Olympics in Rio de Janeiro, Brazil:
  - Malaysian men's doubles, Goh V Shem and Tan Wee Kiong wins silver medal in the badminton.
- 20 August – 2016 Summer Olympics in Rio de Janeiro, Brazil:
  - Malaysian singles, Lee Chong Wei wins silver medal in the badminton.
- 21 August – 2016 Summer Olympics in Rio de Janeiro, Brazil officially ends with Malaysia getting 4 silver and 1 bronze medals.
- 21 August – Controversial singers and rappers, Wee Meng Chee or also known as Namewee is arrested during arrival at Kuala Lumpur International Airport (KLIA) from Taipei, Taiwan for insulting Islam on his video clip "Oh My God". Later, Namewee is released.
- 23 August – The second generation of Proton Persona is launched.
- 27 August
  - More than 1,000 people gathered in the National Mosque and Sogo before marching towards the Merdeka Square, Kuala Lumpur for the Tangkap MO1 rally. The rally ended at evening, with a lower than expected turnout in total.
  - The Ministry of Health is beefing up health screening at the Malaysia–Singapore border entrance in Johor following reports of a Malaysian infected by the Zika virus in Singapore.
- 31 August
  - Police arrested three suspected Islamic State (IS) militants said to have targeted the Batu Caves Hindu Temple and several entertainment outlets in Kuala Lumpur. The attacks are believed to have been scheduled to take place on the Independence Day celebration eve.
  - Malaysian Rio Olympic Team 2016 receives its welcome hero during the Independence Day Parade at Merdeka Square, Kuala Lumpur, Malaysia.

=== September ===
- 1 September
  - The RON 95 priced at RM1.70 per litre (down 5 sen), RON 97 at RM2.05 per litre (down 5 sen), diesel at RM1.70 per litre (unchanged) and Euro 5 diesel at RM1.80 (unchanged).
  - Malaysia Civil Defence Department (JPA3) changes its name to Malaysia Civil Defence Force (APM/MCDF)
  - The Ministry of Health confirmed its first Zika infection case at the Sungai Buloh Hospital, in a woman who recently travelled to Singapore.
- 2 September – Sultan Sharafuddin Idris Shah of Selangor married Norashikin Abdul Rahman, a Radio Televisyen Malaysia (RTM) newscaster. On 9 September, she was appointed as Tengku Permaisuri of Selangor with the title Tengku Permaisuri Norashikin.
- 3 September – Google doodle celebrates the bravery of Sybil Kathigasu, the only British Malayan woman who was awarded the George Medal for bravery, in her efforts of resisting the Japanese occupation of Malaya.
- 4 September – Sri Lanka's High Commissioner to Malaysia I. Ansar is assaulted by a small group of people at the Kuala Lumpur International Airport (KLIA).
- 5 September – Former Prime Minister, Mahathir Mohamad meets former Deputy Prime Minister, Anwar Ibrahim for the first time after 18 years.
- 7 September
  - Hundreds of morning commuters are stranded on their way to work as the Rapid KL's Light Rail Transit (LRT) service for the Kelana Jaya Line is experiencing technical difficulties due to a power outage.
  - The Malaysian United Indigenous Party or Parti Pribumi Bersatu Malaysia (PPBM/BERSATU) is formed under its former 4th Prime Minister, Mahathir Mohamad.
- 8–18 September – Athletes from Malaysia completed at the 2016 Summer Paralympics in Rio de Janeiro, Brazil.
- 9 September
  - Hundreds of evening commuters are stranded again on their way to home for Hari Raya Aidiladha holiday as a power outage hits LRT Kelana Jaya Line stretches from Setiawangsa to KLCC station.
  - Samsung Galaxy Note 7 smartphones are banned at all Malaysian flight carrier due to safety concerns over its battery.
- 10 September – The 2016 Summer Paralympics in Rio de Janeiro, Brazil:
  - Mohamad Ridzuan Mohamad Puzi wins first gold medal in the Men's 100m T36/F36. This is first time that Malaysia to win the gold medal in the Paralympic Games.
  - Muhammad Ziyad Zolkefli wins second gold medal in the Men's shot put T20/F20.
- 11 September – The 2016 Summer Paralympics in Rio de Janeiro, Brazil:
  - Abdul Latif Romly wins third gold medal for Malaysia in the Men's Long Jump T20/F20.
- 15 September – The second anniversary of the Malaysia Airlines Flight MH370 crash:
  - The debris found in Tanzania is from Malaysia Airlines flight MH370.
- 15 September – The 2016 Summer Paralympics in Rio de Janeiro, Brazil:
  - Siti Noor Radiah Ismail wins bronze medal for Malaysia in the Women's Long jump T20/F20.
- 16 September – Ulama figure and Mursyidul Am (spiritual leader) PAS, Dr Haron Din died at the age of 76 at Stanford University Hospital in San Francisco, California, United States. His body was buried at Five Pillars Farm Muslim Cemetery in Livermore, California.
- 18 September – 2016 Summer Paralympics at Rio de Janeiro, Brazil officially ends with Malaysia getting 3 gold and 1 bronze medals.
- 22 September – Malaysian Rio Paralympic Team receives its heroic welcome in Kuala Lumpur, Malaysia.
- 23 September – Former aircraft cabin cleaner supervisor, Ahmad Najib Aris who was a murder of IT analysis, Canny Ong in 2003 was executed (hanging) to death at Kajang Prison, Kajang, Selangor.
- 27 September – Kolej Islam Antarabangsa Sultan Ismail Petra (KIAS) lecturer, Abdullah Fahmi Che Nor Shukri wins the International Quran Recital Competition in Russia.
- 28 September
  - The third generation of Proton Saga is launched.
  - Parti Keadilan Rakyat (PKR) Vice President, Chua Tian Chang is sentenced three months in jail for sedition.
- 28 September – The second anniversary of the Malaysia Airlines Flight MH17 shootdown:
  - The Dutch-led Joint Investigation Team (JIT) has conclusive evidence that the Buk missile system which shootdown the flight MH17 is from pro-Russian rebel controlled territory in eastern Ukraine.
  - Malaysia calls for firm action against those who responsible the downing the flight MH17.
- 30 September – The Bursa Malaysia building, Exchange Square, Kuala Lumpur has been evacuated shortly in the afternoon due to bomb hoax. Police confirmed that the building is safe, entry and occupation of the Exchange Square building has normalized. Later, trading at Bursa Malaysia has now go on as usual in the afternoon session.

=== October ===
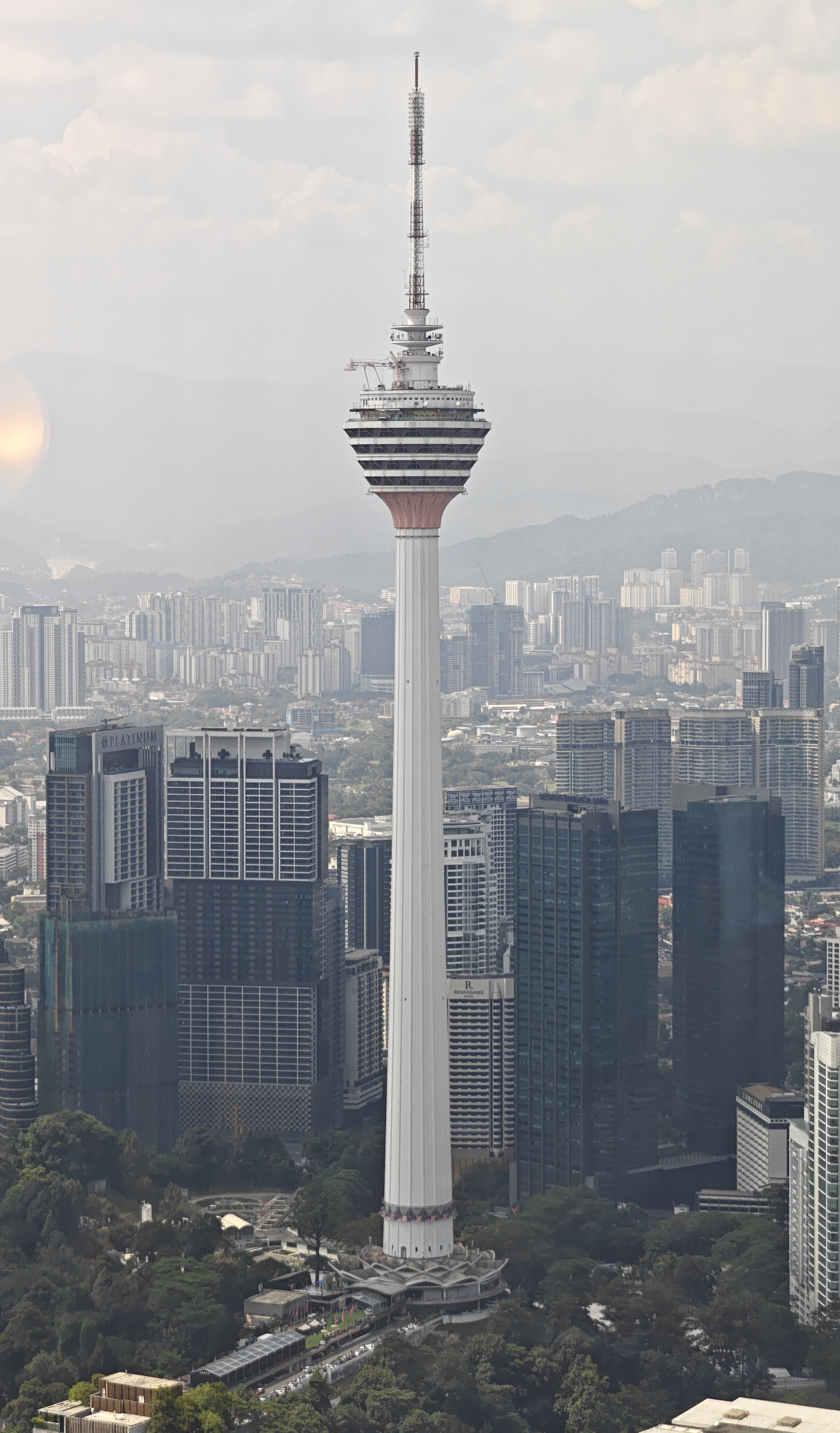
Kuala Lumpur Tower in Bukit Nanas, Kuala Lumpur, Malaysia.

- 1 October
  - The price of RON95, RON97 and Diesel increased by 10 sen.
  - The Kuala Lumpur Tower celebrates its 20th anniversary in Bukit Nanas, Kuala Lumpur, Malaysia.
  - The Phase 1 of the MRT Sungai Buloh-Kajang Line from Sungai Buloh to Semantan has now begun its trial run.
  - The Bersih 5.0 convoy has now kicked off from six different locations nationwide and converge towards Kuala Lumpur, Kuching and Kota Kinabalu for the rally on 19 November.
  - About 2,500 UMNO youths from Kedah, Penang, Perak and Perlis gathered at the Gurney Drive roundabout here to call for the resignation of Lim Guan Eng as Chief Minister of Penang.
- 2 October – Ulama figure and Mursyidul Am (spiritual leader) PAS, Dr. Haron Din is posthumously conferred the Maal Hijrah Special Award while Chief Justice Ahmad Fairuz Sheikh Abdul Halim is picked as national Maal Hijrah figure at the national level 1438AH Maal Hijrah celebration at Malaysia Agro Exposition Park Serdang (MAEPS), Serdang, Selangor.
- 3 October – Nine Australian tourists are arrested at Sepang, Selangor for stripping down to briefs bearing the flag of Malaysia during the 2016 Formula One Malaysian Grand Prix at Sepang International Circuit on 2 October. Later, nine Australian strippers called "Budgie Nine" are released.
- 5 October
  - The Malaysian Anti-Corruption Commission (MACC) has recorded one of its largest ever seizures, totalling RM112 million, following its probe on four people, including two senior officers of a Sabah government agency in Kota Kinabalu. Four men including a director of a Sabah state department and his deputy are remanded seven days over a corruption probe by the MACC.
  - Physician and activists, Dr. Fauziah Mohd Hassan took part in the Women's Boat to Gaza (WBG) peaceful mission to Gaza Strip. The peaceful mission was attacked by Israeli Occupation Navy and took 13 activists including Fauziah in Israeli custody. Later, Fauziah and 12 activists were released by the Israeli Navy.
- 7 October
  - Security forces have arrested more than 10 people suspected to be informers for the Abu Sayyaf and kidnap-for-ransom groups in a special operation in Sabah.
  - The Malaysian Anti-Corruption Commission (MACC) has seized jewellery worth RM3.64 million from two senior Sabah government officers suspected of involvement in a multi-million ringgit graft case.
  - A 54-year-old female senior Customs officer, was killed in a car chase with suspected smugglers "tonto" at Kampung Banggol Chicha in Pasir Mas, Kelantan.
- 8 October
  - Tengku Amir Shah is installed as Raja Muda of Selangor.
  - Two men wearing Bersih 5 T-shirts are attacked by Red Shirts group in Sabak Bernam, Selangor.
  - The Langat and Cheras water treatment plants are shut down due to odour pollution suspected to be from the Semantan River in Pahang
- 9 October – Archbishop Emeritus Anthony Soter Fernandez of Roman Catholic Archdiocese of Kuala Lumpur becomes the Malaysia's first ever cardinal appointed by Pope Francis in Vatican City.
- 11 October – The Federal Court has reserved its judgment on the much-awaited hearing of opposition leader, Anwar Ibrahim's review application to set aside his sodomy conviction.
- 14 October – The special Conference of Rulers is held in Istana Negara, Kuala Lumpur to select the new 15th Yang di-Pertuan Agong. Sultan Muhammad V of Kelantan is elected as the 15th Yang di-Pertuan Agong while Sultan Nazrin Muizzuddin Shah of Perak is elected as a Deputy Yang di-Pertuan Agong.
- 15–17 October – Several parts of West Coast of Peninsular Malaysia are hit by high tide phenomenon.
- 21 October – The 2017 Budget highlights:
  - Budget 2017 allocates RM260.8 billion, an increase of 3.4 per cent from the 2016 Budget Recalibration.
  - RM214.8 billion for operating expenditure and RM46 billion for development expenditure RM77.4 billion is for emoluments and RM32 billion for supplies and services.
  - Under development expenditure, economic sector receives highest share of RM25.9 billion, social sector (RM12.2 billion), security (RM5.3 billion).
  - Revenue collection is expected to expand at 3 per cent to RM219.7 billion.
  - Government is expected to achieve the fiscal deficit target of 3 per cent of GDP in 2017.
  - GST collection reached nearly RM30 billion as of 19 October 2016.
  - Malaysia's Purchasing Power Parity (PPP) has increased from US$23,100 in 2012 to US$26,891 in 2015.
  - Total approved foreign investment was more than RM28 billion during the first half of 2016.
  - Fully paid study leave with scholarship to civil servants in support group.
  - Quarantine leave up to 5 days without record to public servants whose children are ill and required to be quarantined.
  - Public servants' housing loans eligibility to be increased to between RM200,000 and RM750,000.
  - Introduce a grade 56 between grade 54 and JUSA C for medical and dental specialists.
  - 616 km of village roads and bridges will be built and upgraded with RM1.2 billion to enhance connectivity of villages, towns and cities.
  - RM4.6 billion allocated to all states under the Malaysian Road Records Information System (MARRIS) to maintain state roads.
  - RM350 million to build and refurbish 17,000 units of destitute and dilapidated houses in remote villages and Orang Asli settlements.
  - RM 800 million allocated to implement People-Friendly Projects,
  - 69 flood mitigation plans to be continued nationwide with RM495 million allocation.
  - 5,000 unit of MyBeautiful New Home scheme under National Blue Ocean Strategy (NBOS) for B40 group with allocation of RM200 million, government finance RM20,000, remaining will be paid as instalments by owner.
  - RM275 million proposed for various initiatives to improve rakyat's income opportunities especially B40 group.
  - Nearly RM10 billion provided to ease the cost of living, including cooking gas subsidies; toll charges; and public transport.
  - BR1M will be increased to RM1,200 for households in e-Kasih database earning below RM3,000.
  - For households earning between RM3,000 & RM4,000, BR1M will be increased to RM900.
  - BR1M will be increased to RM450 for single individuals earning below RM2,000.
  - TVET education capacity will be enhanced with allocation of RM4.6 billion to TVET institutions.
  - Government provide vacant lands at strategic locations to GLCs and PR1MA to build more than 30,000 houses with the selling price between RM150,000 and RM300,000.
  - Build about 10,000 houses in urban areas for rental to eligible youths with permanent job including young graduates.
  - New special "step-up" end-financing scheme for the PR1MA programme. Through this scheme, financing will be easier and more accessible to the buyers with total loan up to 90 per cent to 100 per cent.
  - 4 more Urban Transformation Centre (UTC) in Negeri Sembilan, Penang, Perlis, and Selangor, 3 more Rural Transformation Centre (RTC) in Selangor, Sabah and Sarawak will be built with an allocation of RM100 million.
  - Lifestyle tax relief up to RM2,500 from 2017 will include purchase of printed newspapers, smartphones and tablets, internet subscriptions and gym membership.
  - RM40 million for 1Malaysia English, Coding in schools, Volunteering for International Professional and Global Entrepreneurship Community 2.
  - RM1.2 billion allocated for sports, including RM450 million especially for hosting 29th SEA Games and 9th ASEAN Para Games in 2017.
  - RM25 billion allocation proposed for various health programmes.
  - RM20 million allocation in form of loans for NGOs to operate non-profit charitable hospitals based on government hospital rates.
  - RM1.3 billion is allocated to increase food production at a competitive price.
  - Proposal for RM5,000 grant to purchase new vehicles and offer individual taxi permits, with an allocation of RM60 million, in move to benefit 12,000 taxi drivers.
  - BR1M recipients in B40 group to be encouraged to participate as Uber drivers.
  - Government to extend e-Visa to countries in the Balkans and South Asia regions.
  - Malaysian Communications and Multimedia Commission (MCMC) to provide RM1 billion to ensure coverage and quality of broadband nationwide reaches up to 20 megabytes per second.
  - The 30-year vision plan of National Transformation 2050 (TN50) is announced.
- 22 October – Penang Free School celebrates its 200th anniversary of the foundation since 1916.
- 23 October – The Semenyih River water treatment plant had to be shut down due to the detection of contamination in the Semenyih River, Hulu Langat, Selangor.
- 25 October – 2016 Sultanah Aminah Hospital fire:
  - Six patients were killed when a fire broke out in an intensive care unit (ICU) ward of the Sultanah Aminah Hospital in Johor Bahru, Johor. This was the worst hospital fire in the nation's history.
- 30 October – Kedah wins Malaysia Cup for the first time in eight years after beating Selangor 6–5 in the penalty shootout (1-1 aggregate) at Shah Alam Stadium, Shah Alam, Selangor.
- 31 October – Singer and actress, Soo Wincci enters Malaysia Book of Records as first Miss World Malaysia to receive doctorate from the Open University Malaysia (OUM).

=== November ===
- 1 November
  - The price of RON95, RON97 and Diesel increased by 15 sen.
  - Singaporean cars to pay new RM20 Vehicle Entry Permit (VEP) charge to enter mainland Johor.
  - Construction works of the Gemas-Johor Bahru Electrified Double Tracking Project (EDTP) has now begun. The project will be implemented by the Chinese company, China Railway Construction Company (CRCC).
  - An Australian engineer, Gaskell James who went missing at Gunung Mulu National Park, Sarawak on 31 October has found saved.
- 3 November – Sultan Ibrahim of Johor bans all street demonstration in the state. Johor is the first state to imposed such a ban.
- 7 November – Several parts of Penang Island are hit by flash floods and landslides.
- 8 November – Iskandar Malaysia (IM) celebrates its 10th anniversary of the formation.
- 14 November – Pandan Member of Parliament, Rafizi Ramli gets 18 months in jail for breaching the Official Secrets Act (OSA) 1972 by disclosing part of the Auditor General's Report on 1Malaysia Development Berhad (1MDB).
- 18 November – Pre-Bersih 5.0 rally:
  - Bersih chairman, Maria Chin Abdullah arrested by police and she was remanded for 28 days under Security Offences (Special Measures) Act (SOSMA).
  - Bersih office in Petaling Jaya, Selangor are raided by police.
  - Red Shirts leader, Jamal Yunos arrested by police.
  - Nine members of Bersih and Red Shirts are detained by police.
- 19 November – Four people were killed in a two vehicle collision at Kota Tinggi-Mersing road near FELCRA Sungai Ara, Johor.
- 19 November – The Bersih 5.0 rally: More than 44,000 people are taking part in the Bersih 5.0-Red Shirts rally in Kuala Lumpur. No incidents are reported in the rally.
  - Some 200 Bersih 5.0 supporters have begun gathering around the Sogo Shopping Complex, at Jalan Tuanku Abdul Rahman, Kuala Lumpur.
  - Bersih protester marched towards Jamek Mosque and Red Shirts towards Padang Merbok.
  - Police confirmed that they have detained 10 individuals in relation to the Bersih 5.0 rally which is taking place in Kuala Lumpur.
  - More than 20,000 Bersih 5.0 supporters from Nasional Mosque have made their way to Jamek Mosque as off 1.20 pm.
  - Former Prime Minister, Mahathir Mohamad and his son or also a former Menteri Besar of Kedah, Mukhriz Mahathir arrived in the rally.
  - National Mosque Bersih group joins Masjid Jamek Bersih group.
  - About 40,000 Bersih 5.0 supporters gathered at Jalan Ampang in front of KLCC.
  - At 4:30 pm, Bersih 5.0 rally ended with Negaraku national anthem.
  - Batu PKR Member of Parliament, Chua Tian Chang and PKR Wanita Chief, Zuraida Kamaruddin were detained by police after Bersih rally.
- 22 November – Malaysia will stop hosting the Formula 1 Malaysian Grand Prix after their current agreement expires in the end of 2018.
- 23 November – More than 500 women marched to Parliament House demanding the immediate release of Bersih chief Maria Chin Abdullah from her SOSMA detention.
- 24 November
  - Shah Alam Amanah Member of Parliament, Khalid Abdul Samad is attacked by a group from the Pasir Salak UMNO Youth division as he entered Parliament grounds.
  - Proton Ertiga MPV is launched.
- 28 November
  - The Malaysian Anti-Corruption Commission (MACC) arrested two civil servants in separate operations and froze several bank accounts containing millions of ringgit, believed to have been amassed through graft.
  - Bersih leader, Maria Chin Abdullah has been released from detention under the SOSMA act.
  - The body found during a search-and-rescue (SAR) operation at Mount Damavand, Iran was confirmed to be Syed Redzuan Syed Salim Shatri, one of the two Malaysians who was reported missing since 20 November.
- 30 November – The implementation of the Secured Automated Clearance System for Malaysian Citizen Motorcyclists (M-BIKE) at Sultan Iskandar Building, Johor Bahru and Sultan Abu Bakar Complex, Tanjung Kupang, Johor.

=== December ===
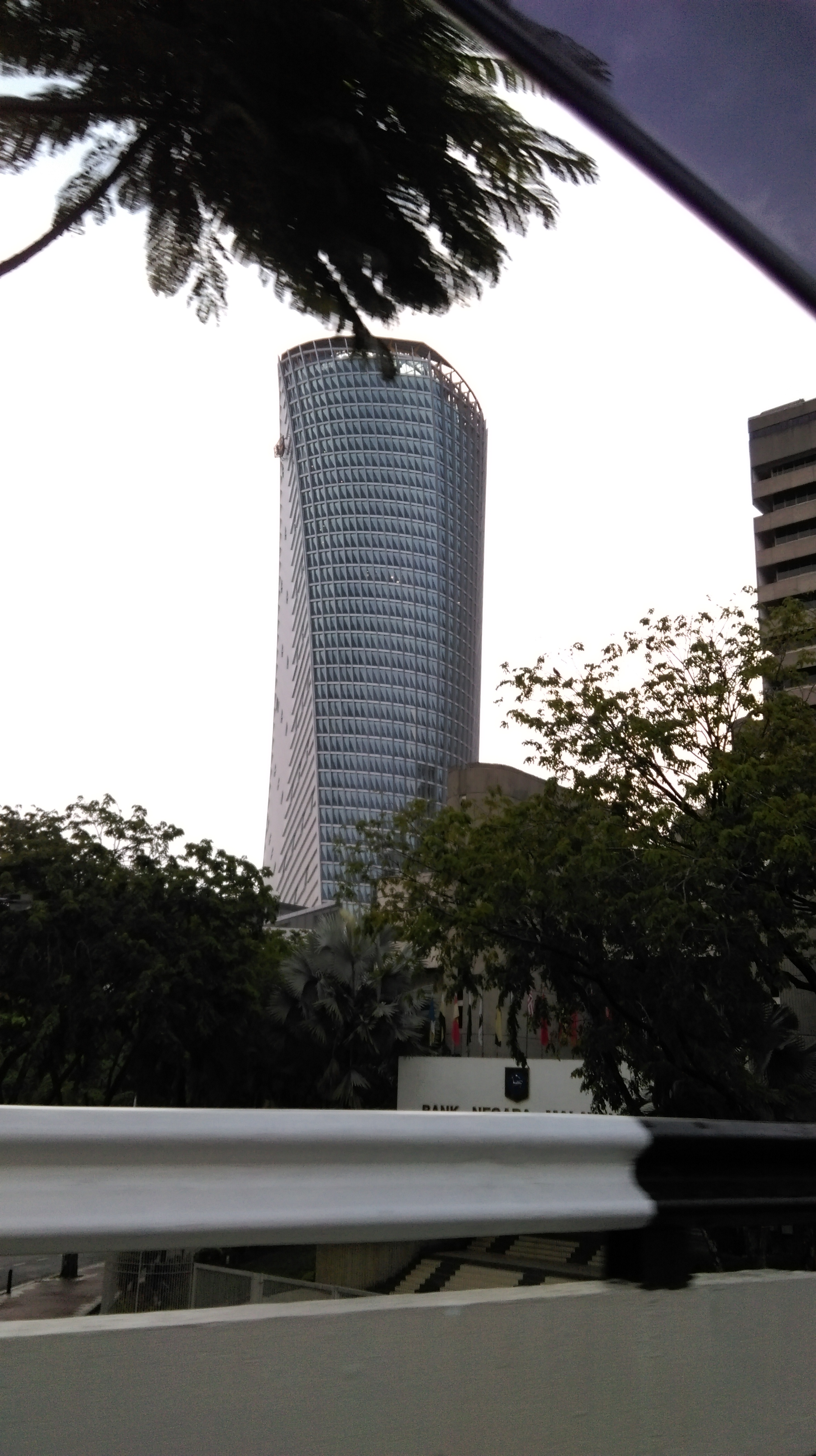
Menara Kerja Raya, Malaysian Public Works Department (JKR) Headquarters in Kuala Lumpur.

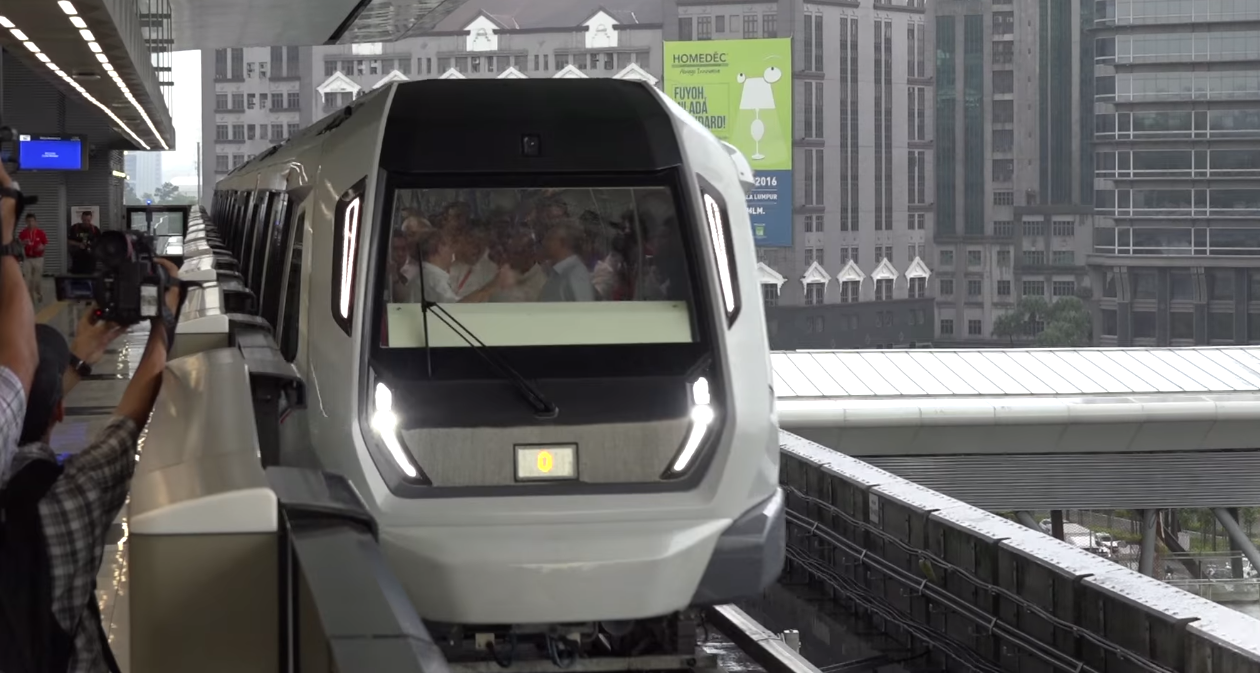
The Siemens Inspiro of the MRT Sungai Buloh-Kajang Line at Phileo Damansara MRT station. The Phase 1 of the MRT Sungai Buloh-Kajang Line from Sungai Buloh to Semantan.

- 1 December
  - The retail price of RON95 and RON97 petrol and diesel decreased by five sen per litre from midnight.
  - Three people dead and three others were injured in a drive-by shooting at Tun Dr Lim Chong Eu Expressway in Penang. The victims was identified as Datuk Ong Teik Kwang or "Datuk M". Another person injured was Radio Televisyen Malaysia (RTM) videographer Mohamad Amirul Amin. Later, police have caught the man suspected of shooting three people dead in a car on the Tun Dr Lim Chong Eu Expressway.
- 2 December –National footballer, Mohd Faiz Subri officially shortlisted as among the top three nominees for the FIFA Puskás Award for the best goal of the year.
- 4 December – Thousands of Muslims, mostly Rohingya, turned up at the Titiwangsa Stadium, Kuala Lumpur to protest an army crackdown in northern Rakhine, Myanmar, that has killed dozens and displaced thousands of people.
- 7 December
  - Official opening of the Menara Kerja Raya, the headquarters of the Malaysian Public Works Department (JKR) in Kuala Lumpur.
  - Myanmar has banned workers from going to Muslim-majority Malaysia as relations sour between the neighbours over a bloody military crackdown on the Buddhist country's Rohingya minority.
- 8 December
  - Sultan of Terengganu, Sultan Mizan Zainal Abidin has consented to restore the Terengganu State Award to Menteri Besar Ahmad Razif Abdul Rahman.
  - Tengku Muhammad Faiz Petra, the Tengku Mahkota of Sultan of Kelantan is appointed as Regent of Kelantan during the 5-year term of his brother, Sultan Muhammad V, as 15th Yang di-Pertuan Agong of Malaysia. His regency is effective since 13 December.
- 12 December – The 14th Yang di-Pertuan Agong, Sultan Abdul Halim Mu'adzam Shah of Kedah departed from Kuala Lumpur after the end of his term and returned to his state as its ruler.
- 13 December – The 15th Yang di-Pertuan Agong, Sultan Muhammad V of Kelantan was elected by the Conference of Rulers in Istana Negara, Jalan Tuanku Abdul Halim, Kuala Lumpur, beginning his five-year term as Head of state.
- 15 December – Official opening of the Phase 1 of the MRT Sungai Buloh-Kajang Line from Sungai Buloh to Semantan.
- 24 December – An express bus skidded and plunged off a cliff early morning in Muar, Johor, killing 14 people including the driver.

== National Day and Malaysia Day ==
=== Theme ===
Malaysia, Sehati Sejiwa (United, Unified Malaysia)

=== National Day parade ===
Merdeka Square, Kuala Lumpur

=== Malaysia Day celebration ===
Padang Lapangan Terbang Lama Bintulu, Bintulu, Sarawak

== Sports ==
- 15–17 January – 2016 EurAsia Cup.
- 19–24 January – 2016 Malaysia Open Grand Prix Gold.
- 30 January – 14 May – 2016 Malaysia FA Cup.
- 13 February – 2016 Sultan Haji Ahmad Shah Cup.
- 24 February – 2 March – 2016 Tour de Langkawi.
- 26 February – 6 March – 2016 BMW Malaysian Open.
- 28 February – 6 March – 2016 World Team Table Tennis Championship.
- 13–15 May – 2016 Motul Superbike FIM World Championship in Sepang Circuit, Sepang, Selangor.
- 23–31 July – 2016 Sukma Games in Sarawak.
- 6–10 August – 2016 Malaysian Paralympiad in Sarawak.
- 7 August – The Standard Chartered Kuala Lumpur International Marathon 2015.
- 30 September – 2 October – 2016 Petronas Malaysian Grand Prix.
- 28–30 October – 2016 Shell Advance Malaysian Motorcycle Grand Prix.
- 20 November – 2016 Penang Bridge International Marathon.

== Deaths ==
- 15 January – Tunku Alif Hussein Saifuddin Al-Amin – 3rd and youngest son of the current Yang di-Pertuan Besar of Negeri Sembilan, Tuanku Muhriz of Negeri Sembilan.
- 18 March – Datuk Adnan Abu Hassan – Composer and musician.
- 22 April – Ayah Pin (real name: Ariffin Mohamad) – religious sect leader and founder of Kerajaan Langit (Sky Kingdom) in Besut, Terengganu.
- 25 April – Samantha Schubert, former Miss Malaysia World 1991 pageant, model and actress.
- 5 May – 2016 Sebuyau helicopter crash:
  - Noriah Kasnon – Deputy Minister of the Plantation Industries and Commodities and also Sungai Besar Member of Parliament.
  - Wan Mohammad Khair-il Anuar – Kuala Kangsar Member of Parliament.
- 12 June – Tan Sri Abdullah Ahmad (Dollah Kok Lanas) – former New Straits Times editor in chief and also former Machang and Kok Lanas Member of Parliament.
- 18 August – Noor Amila Edrus Norsham – A five-year-old boy.
- 16 September – Dato' Haron Din – Ulama figure, Mursyidul Am (spiritual leader) PAS and founder of Darussyiffa Islamic Treatment Centre in Bandar Baru Bangi, Selangor.
- 23 September – Ahmad Najib Aris – Canny Ong's murderer was executed (hanging) to death at Kajang Prison.
- 10 October – Aman Ullah Karim – former Malaysian hockey player in the 1956 Summer Olympics in Melbourne, Australia.

== See also ==
- 2016
- 2015 in Malaysia | 2017 in Malaysia
- History of Malaysia
- List of Malaysian films of 2016
