= Nenasi =

Town in Malaysia

Coordinates: 3°08′N 103°27′E

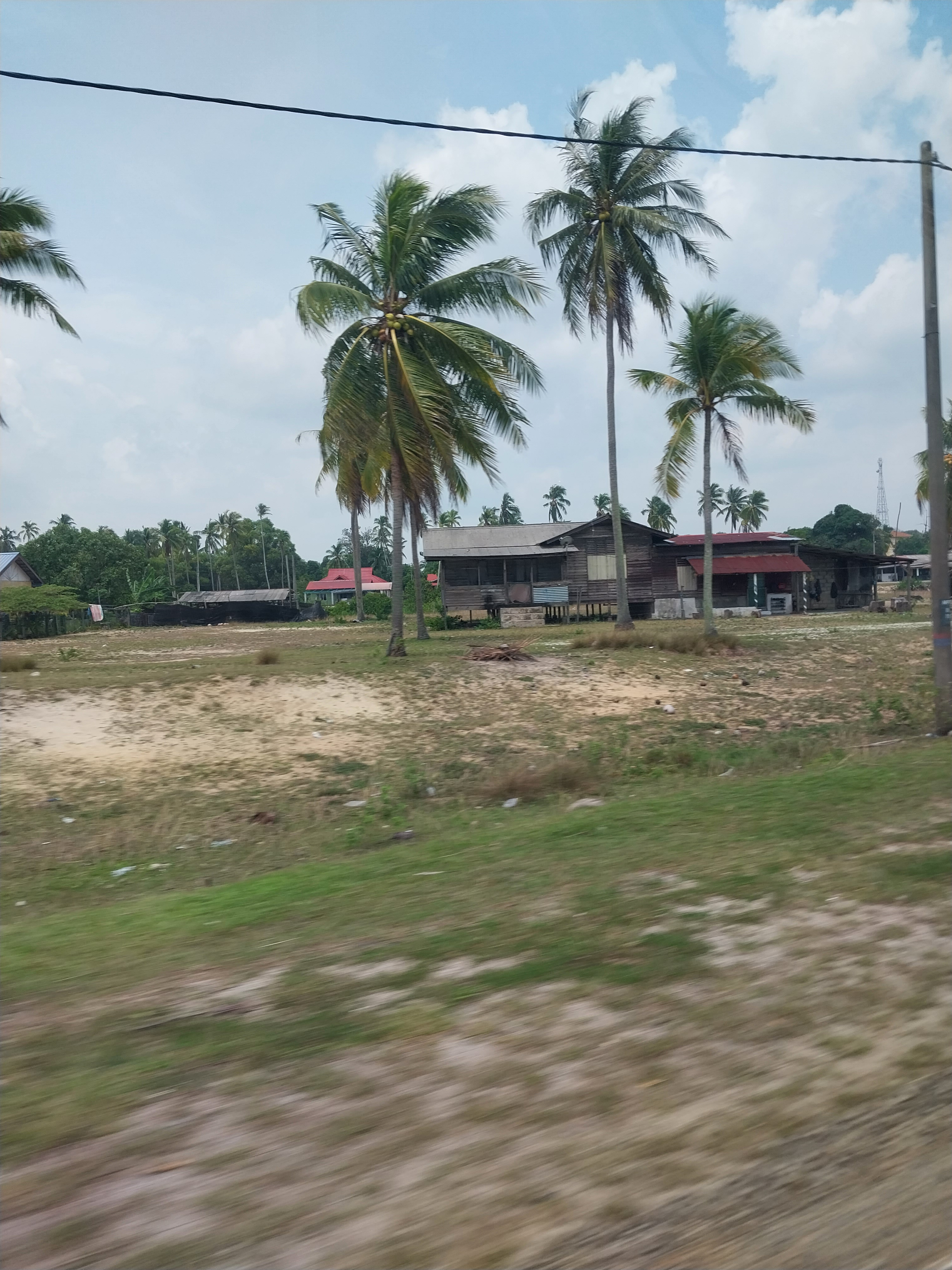
Fisherman village in Nenasi, Pekan, Pahang.

Nenasi is a town in Pekan District, Pahang, Malaysia. Nenasi is a great area for camping, fishing and barbecue activities on the beach and forest. There are fisherman village, beach, swamps, rice fields, rivers and forest to explore. Nenasi also a famous place to watch firefly due to its natural swamps. Most of their residence work as a farmer and fisherman.
