= 2016 anti-TPPA rally =

2016 anti-TTPA rally
- Date: 26 January 2016
- Location: Kuala Lumpur
- Caused by: Protest against Trans-Pacific Partnership Agreement
- Methods: Demonstration, speeches

Parties
National Trust Party, Parti Keadilan Rakyat	Police

Number
Police estimation: 5000–7000	

The Anti-TPPA (Trans-Pacific Partnership Agreement) Rally or Perhimpunan Aman Bantah TPPA (Malay) is a rally that was held in Kuala Lumpur, Malaysia on January 23, 2016. The rally was organised by a coalition of non-governmental organisations, Bantah TPPA and Kongres Rakyat, and supported by various non-governmental organisations. The rally was held in response to the Malaysian government's signing of the Trans-Pacific Partnership Agreement in which twelve countries, namely Australia, Brunei, Canada, Chile, Japan, Mexico, New Zealand, Peru, Singapore, United States, Vietnam and including Malaysia concluded the trade negotiations in Atlanta on October 5, 2015. Opponents of the agreement argued that although TPPA could increase Malaysia's Gross Domestic Product (GDP), it was at the people's expense as it does not take into account issues faced by the people. The rally saw participants march from various points in Kuala Lumpur to their eventual destination, Dataran Merdeka.

== Background ==
The Trans-Pacific Partnership (TPP) is a trade agreement among twelve Pacific Rim countries concerning a variety of matters of economic policy, which was reached on 5 October 2015 after 7 years of negotiations. The agreement's stated goal had been to "promote economic growth; support the creation and retention of jobs; enhance innovation, productivity and competitiveness; raise living standards; reduce poverty in our countries; and promote transparency, good governance, and enhanced labor and environmental protections." Among other things, the TPP Agreement contains measures to lower trade barriers such as tariffs, and establish an investor-state dispute settlement mechanism (but states can opt out from tobacco-related measures). Concerns have been made such as government procurement, state-owned enterprises, Bumiputera issues and public access to affordable drugs and healthcare, while ensuring necessary incentives for pharmaceutical innovators and rising cost of living.

The organiser's application for holding the rally at Dataran Merdeka was rejected by Kuala Lumpur City Hall (DBKL). This however has not deterred the organisers from insisting that the rally would still take place.

== Participants ==
It has been estimated that there will be 20,000 people attending the rally, as well as 300 non-governmental organisations.

- Bersih
- Perkasa
- Ikatan Muslim Malaysia (Isma)
- Gabungan Mahasiswa Islam se-Malaysia (Gamis)
- Pertubuhan Ikram Malaysia (Ikram)
- Angkatan Belia Islam Malaysia (Abim)
- Socialist Party of Malaysia (PSM)
- Pan-Malaysian Islamic Party (PAS)
- Amanah
- Parti Keadilan Rakyat (PKR)

== DAP slammed by PSM ==
PSM Secretary General, Sivarajan slammed Lim Guan Eng of DAP on their stands regarding the rally and the upcoming protest on 23 Jan 2016. In the statement available on PSM's Facebook page, Sivarajan said : "LGE be mature and take the challenge ! PSM has been fighting the pro corporate US free trade agreements since 2006, when Rafidah Aziz negotiated the US Msia FTA. When DAP and PKR were still undecided on the matter then, and preferred not to offend the US, PSM has already been organizing protest at the US Embassy against US corporate interest. Thus, we will do the same come Saturday 23/1 to Protes the looming TPPA ! While various civil society and students held a protest outside USM when Minister Musthapa Mohamed went for a TPPA roadshow there recently, LGE decided to have a late nasi kandar dinner with the MInister instead. Thus, its not only PSM, but many want to know on which side is DAP and LGE on this issue. So LGE, if you are serious about fighting against TPPA, take the challenge, ask your branches to mobilize to attend the protest. We, PSM will be there, I hope to see you there too."
