= 2016 Movida Bar grenade attack =

Attack in Puchong, Selangor, Malaysia

- Location: 3.046236°N 101.620796°E; Puchong, Selangor, Malaysia
- Date: 28 June 2016; 02:15AM MST (UTC+08:00)
- Target: Civilians
- Weapon: Grenade
- Deaths: 0
- Injuries: 8
- Perpetrator: Islamic State of Iraq and the Levant
- Assailants: Imam Wahyudin Karjono; Jonius Ondie
- No. of participants: 2
- Motive: Militant Islamism and terrorism

On 28 June 2016, a bar located in Puchong, Selangor, Malaysia, was attacked by two people who threw a grenade into the bar while 20 customers were watching the UEFA Euro 2016 match between Italy and Spain. The attack injured eight people, including one foreigner from China. The attackers left the scene on a motorcycle but were subsequently arrested. The attack was described as the first ever Islamic terror attack against the country perpetrated by Malaysians militants linked to Islamic State of Iraq and the Levant.

== Background ==
Although Malaysia is located far from the major conflicts of the Middle East, the growing Islamic extremism and religious bigotry, along with the religion's politicisation, has led to radicalism. Until 2015, there were around 200 Malaysian Muslims that had joined the Islamic State (IS) in its fight in the Syrian Civil War and Iraqi Civil War to establish a modern Islamic caliphate. Many of these returnees have been brainwashed by their leaders in Syria and Iraq to fight their own countrymen because they don't share the same interpretations of Islamic law. Following the rise of extremism, some radical Malaysian Muslims have threatened the government and country, and many have been arrested and blocked from entering the country as well as travelling to Syria. This is believed to be the main reason that many of the Malaysian ISIS members and supporters who reside in the country have decided to rebel against their own government.

== Perpetrators ==
Shortly after the attack, the deputy police chief of Selangor state, Abdul Rahim Jaafar, ruled out the possibility of it being a terrorist attack, and said the motive was business rivalry, revenge, or a targeted killing since a similar attack happened in 2014 when a man was killed and 13 others injured after a grenade exploded outside a pub in Kuala Lumpur that was linked to gambling kingpin.

According to a Facebook post released shortly after the incident, the director of the bar, Roger Hew, claimed preliminary investigations revealed that the attackers were "an Indian couple" that was targeted by two Indian men due to personal matters. This claim was soon disputed by the would-be victims in Hew statement with a legal action to be issued on the bar owner if he did not apologise for making false statement; pointing out that the grenade had instead hit other two victims who seated several tables away from them at the time of the incident.

More evidence are soon discovered in which according to Sin Chew Daily who posted a screenshot of a Facebook post under the account "Abu Hamzah Al-Fateh" (the Facebook account is known to be associated with a Malaysian man fighting for ISIS in Syria). The owner of the account reportedly wrote that two members of "junud khilafah wilayah milazia" [sic] had targeted a nightclub full of "heathens" who had not respected the Muslim holy month of Ramadan with "immoral acts". The user urged other Muslims to stay away from places like this to avoid becoming targets. The claims were also supported by a statement issued from an ISIS platform monitored by the International Centre for Political Violence and Terrorism Research at the S. Rajaratnam School of International Studies in Singapore.

=== Arrests ===
On 4 July, Malaysia's Inspector-General of Police (IGP) Khalid Abu Bakar confirmed that the attack was perpetrated by Malaysian ISIS members. This was met with shock and anger by many Malaysians. Following more investigations, around 15 people (from different states of Perlis, Selangor, Perak, Kedah, Penang and Sabah) have been arrested including two police officers, many related to ISIS. The two people who are suspected of throwing the grenade were also arrested. Malaysia's IGP said the attack was planned by a Malaysian residing in Syria named Muhamad Wanndy Mohamad Jedi (nom de guerre Abu Hamzah) who instructed his men to launch attacks in their home country against senior leaders in the government and the Royal Malaysia Police, as well as judges because they try to block militant activity. Wanndy also has reportedly warned that there will be more attacks to come although this has been denied by most experts as their group is suspected of not having the resources to launch a bigger attack. However, all these claims were denied by Wanndy itself, saying that:

Those are serious allegations to make me a scapegoat. They (police) are cooking up stories as revenge towards me and manipulating facts of the arrests to divert people's attention from Malaysia's current issues, which are getting worse. Those arrested are mere supporters, who expressed support for the Islamic caliphate, and they have never received instructions from me to launch attacks on leaders and judges, as claimed by the IGP.

The two perpetrators who threw the grenade that have been caught identified as:

- Imam Wahyudin Karjono of Puchong, Selangor
- Jonius Ondie Jahali of Kota Marudu, Sabah

Both suspects have pleaded guilty to charges of attempting to murder eight people and possession of a grenade and to an additional eight charges. Their sentences included a long-term jail up to 30-years for their murder attempt and another 14 years jail together with caning (rotan) for their possession of explosives and another 30 years jail or life imprisonment for becoming a member of and supporting terrorist activities. Preliminary investigation revealed they obtained the grenade from a neighbouring country.

Another two that are believed to be involved in the planning of attack are identified as:

- Md Saifuddin Muji of Rengit, Johor
- Jasanizam Rosni of Batu Pahat, Johor

Both also have since been arrested during anti-terrorism operations that were carried out from 20 July–9 August.

On 29 March 2017, the two main perpetrators were sentenced to 25 years in jail with eight charges for attempted murder, possession of firearms, committing criminal and terrorist acts. Despite appeal made by the two perpetrators to the Court of Appeal of Malaysia, the court upheld the 2017 sentence made by the High Court where each of them were also receiving an additional sentence of 10 years jail for giving support to the IS group.

It was later reported on 29 April 2017 that Wanndy, who are claimed to be the mastermind on the bar attack was killed by a drone attack in Syria.

== Victims ==
No deaths were reported after the incident, but eight people are injured during the blast. Most of the victims were Malaysians while another was a female tourist from China.

== Response ==
Following the attack, the Royal Malaysia Police and Malaysian Army have started beefing up security to prevent attacks in the future. The US State Department has plans to set up a data centre in Malaysia following the attack to curb further ISIS propaganda.

== See also ==
- List of terrorist incidents linked to ISIL
- List of terrorist incidents, January–June 2016
