= Malaysian Citizens' Declaration =

2016 demand for Malaysia's Prime Minister Najib Razak to step down

Deklarasi Rakyat
- Context: Demands for Najib Razak to resign as Prime Minister and calls for political reform in Malaysia.
- Signed: 4 March 2016
- Location: Kuala Lumpur, Malaysia
- Mediators: Khairuddin Abu Hassan
- Signatories: Mahathir Mohamad and 57 other signatories

The Citizens' Declaration (Malay: Deklarasi Rakyat) was a declaration issued by an array of Malaysian political leaders on 4 March 2016 to demand Prime Minister Najib Razak's resignation from office. It was launched at a press conference chaired by former Prime Minister Mahathir Mohamad.

Coming amidst the 1Malaysia Development Berhad scandal, the declaration also saw Malaysia's two biggest political arch-rivals, Anwar Ibrahim and Mahathir Mohamad, work together for people's rights. Besides demanding that Najib be removed from his position, the declaration signed by, among others, former Premier Mahathir and 57 other signatories also touched on freedom of speech and a free media.

== Content ==
The main points of the declaration were:

- The removal of Najib Razak as the prime minister of Malaysia through non-violent and legally permissible means;
- The removal of all those who have acted in concert with him;
- A repeal of all recent laws and agreements that violate the fundamental rights guaranteed by the Federal Constitution, and;
- A restoration of the integrity of the institutions that have been undermined, such as the Royal Malaysia Police (RMP), the Malaysian Anti-Corruption Commission (MACC), Bank Negara Malaysia (BNM) and the Public Accounts Committee (PAC).

The declaration included several key reasons for the demands:

- Concern over the deteriorating political, economic and social situation in the country;
- Damage done to the country under the premiership of Najib Razak;
- Malaysia becoming one of the 10 most corrupt countries in the world, according to Ernst and Young in their Asia Pacific Fraud Survey Report Series 2013. The 2015 Corruption Perception Index showed Malaysia had dropped four places from 50 to 54; and,
- Allocations to all ministries and public institutions, including universities, have been reduced because of a shortage of funds. Even when allocations are budgeted for, no money is available.

== Signatories ==
- Mahathir Mohamad – Former Prime Minister of Malaysia
- Lim Kit Siang – DAP Supremo and Gelang Patah MP
- Azmin Ali – Selangor Chief Minister and Deputy President of PKR
- Mukhriz Mahathir – Former Chief Minister of Kedah
- Muhyiddin Yassin - Former Prime Minister of Malaysia
- Syed Saddiq Syed Abdul Rahman – Malaysian Asia Award Winning Best Debater
- Zaid Ibrahim – Former Law Minister
- Ling Liong Sik – Former MCA President
- Mahfuz Omar – PAS Lawmaker and Pokok Sena MP
- Maria Chin Abdullah – BERSIH Chairman
- Nurul Izzah Anwar – PKR Vice President and Lembah Pantai MP
- Mohamad Sabu – President of Party AMANAH Negara
- Salahuddin Ayub – Parti Amanah Negara (Amanah) Deputy President
- Ambiga Sreenevasan – Former Bar Council Chairperson
- Rafizi Ramli – PKR Vice President and Pandan MP
- Kamaruddin Jaafar - PKR Tumpat MP
- Tian Chua - PKR Vice-president
- Muhammad Muhammad Taib - Former Selangor Menteri Besar
- Anthony Loke - DAP Organising Secretary
- Teresa Kok - DAP lawmaker and Seputeh MP
- Hishamuddin Rais - Political Activist
- Datuk Mujahid Yusof Rawa - Party AMANAH Negara Vice-president
- Tok Muda Dato Wan Abu Bakar Wan Mohamed - Former Deputy Defence Minister/ Former UMNO Supreme Council Member
- Datuk Hamidah Osman and Anina Saadudin - Former UMNO leader

== Observers ==
- Datuk Mustafa Ali – PAS Election Director
- Khairuddin Razali – PAS Ulama Council Information Chief

== Full Text of Citizens' Declaration ==
CITIZENS' DECLARATION

1. We - the undersigned citizens of Malaysia append below our concern over the deteriorating political, economic and social situation in the country.

2. We wish to draw the attention of the people of Malaysia to the damage done to the country under the Premiership of Dato' Sri Najib Tun Razak.

3. Under his administration the country has descended to become one of the 10 most corrupt countries in the world according to Ernst and Young in their Asia Pacific Fraud Survey Report Series 2013. The 2015 Corruption Perception Index showed Malaysia has dropped four places from 50 to 54.

4. This is because he believes that money can ensure his position as Prime Minister of Malaysia. He believes that "Cash is King".

5. Allocations to all ministries and public institutions including universities have been reduced because of shortages of funds. Even when allocations are budgeted for, no money was available.

6. In 2009 he decided to set up a Sovereign Wealth fund to earn income for the Government.

7. He created the 1 Malaysia Development Berhad (1MDB) which became indebted with RM42 billion of loans which it is unable to repay. It is no longer a Sovereign Wealth fund. It is a Sovereign Debt Fund.

8. 1MDB borrowed approximately RM20 billion to acquire three power plant companies for an over-priced RM12.1 billion. Despite being awarded new power plant contracts and extensions to the expiring power-producing concessions, the 1MDB power companies were sold for RM9.83 billion, or a loss of RM2.27 billion.

9. 1MDB invested or lent a total of US$1.83 billion to Petrosaudi International (PSI) Limited between 2009 and 2011 under the pretext of bogus projects or non-existent assets. Bank Negara Malaysia had demanded 1MDB return the above money to Malaysia as their approval was given based on misinformation submitted by 1MDB. Of this sum, a total of US$1.45 billion was directly and indirectly siphoned off to Good Star Limited and other companies controlled by Low Taek Jho.

10. To hide the missing funds, 1MDB "disposed" its investments and loans to PSI for US$2.318 billion, claiming to have made a profit of US$488 million. However, no money was returned to Malaysia. Instead, 1MDB claimed it invested the funds in Cayman Islands that was subsequently found to be an unlicensed investment manager. KPMG was sacked as 1MDB's auditors for refusing to confirm the value of the investment in the mysterious Caymans fund.

11. 1MDB claimed that the Cayman Islands investment has been fully redeemed. US$1.22 billion was reportedly redeemed on 5 November 2014 but was substantially utilised on the very same day to compensate Aabar Investments PJS for the termination of options granted to Aabar to acquire 49% of 1MDB's power companies. This is a lie because the parent of Aabar, International Petroleum Investment Corporation (IPIC) did not mention receipt of any such payments in its audited accounts published on the London Stock Exchange. Instead the accounts stated that 1MDB owes IPIC the sum of US$481 million for the termination.

12. 1MDB also took another loan of US$975 million from a Deutsche Bank-led consortium in September 2014, for the very same purpose of compensating Aabar for the terminated options. The Wall Street Journal has exposed the fact that these money have been paid to a different British Virgin Islands entity with a similar name, "Aabar Investment PJS Limited", whose beneficial owner is completely unrelated to IPIC. The simple scam has fooled even the 1MDB auditors, Deloitte Malaysia into believing that the payments were indeed received by IPIC's Aabar.

13. 1MDB announced that it made a 2nd and final RM1.1 billion redemption of the Cayman Islands investment in January 2015. Initially, the Prime Minister told Parliament that the sum was held in cash in BSI Bank, Singapore. However, two months later in May 2015, he informed Parliament that it was not cash but "assets". Subsequently, it was explained that these assets were "units" which meant that they were never redeemed in the first place. This proved that 1MDB and the Prime Minister have been consistently lying to the Malaysian public. It also means that the money invested in Petrosaudi which was reinvested in Cayman Islands, are still missing and unaccounted for.

14. A former UMNO vice-head of the Batu Kawan Division made a police report on the loss of large sums of money by 1MDB. No investigations were carried out by the police. Instead he was interrogated by police, detained and charged under anti-terrorist law (SOSMA) for sabotage of the Malaysian economy. His lawyer was also arrested and charged under the same law. This has the effect of frightening people from making police reports on the 1MDB.

15. The Wall Street Journal reported that Najib had US$681 million in his private account at Ambank.

16. Najib denied this at first but later admitted he had the huge amount of money in his account. He claimed that it was a gift from an Arab; then that it was a donation to help him win the 13th general election in Malaysia; then that it was given because of his dedication to the fight against Islamic terrorists. He then claimed to have received the money from a Saudi prince, then from the King of Saudi Arabia who had passed away.

17. Later a Saudi Minister stated there was no record of such a gift by the Saudis. He suggested it was probably a Saudi investment. The amount was small.

18. Najib expressed his intention to sue the Wall Street Journal. But he did not. Instead he asked his lawyer to ask the Wall Street Journal why it published the report.

19. To this day the WSJ continues to report more and more details about the US$681 million he has in his private account. He has not sued WSJ, which he can do in the country the WSJ is published.

20. Concerned over the huge sum of money in Najib's private account a task force was set up in Malaysia to investigate the origin of the money. Four Government institutions became members of the task force. They are the Police, the Attorney General, Bank Negara and the Malaysian Anti-Corruption Commission.

21. Before the Task Force was able to finish its work, the Attorney General was removed by Najib claiming that he was sick and could not continue to work. Basically Najib had misrepresented to the King to get the Attorney General to be replaced. The Public Accounts Committee was basically paralysed by Najib removing its chairman and members to prevent its investigation of the 1MDB. A new chairman, friendly to Najib was appointed and he promptly declared that Najib had done nothing wrong.

22. He then appointed a new Attorney General. Shortly thereafter the new Attorney General dismissed a recommendation by Bank Negara for action to be taken, claiming that nothing in the report showed Najib had done any wrong.

23. Bank Negara appealed but this was brushed aside.

24. The new Attorney General also dismissed another report by the MACC. The contents of the report are not revealed and threats are made against revealing its contents.

25. The new Attorney General has without valid explanations, dismissed the recommendations of the two institutions that possess the powers and expertise in their areas.

26. This dismissal prevented the matter from being determined by a court of law after all the evidence was evaluated. By doing so the Attorney General has acted as prosecutor and judge. Due process and the rule of law have been denied.

27. The sacked Deputy Prime Minister later revealed that the former Attorney General had shown him proof of Najib's wrongdoings relating to the scandals. At the same time, various foreign Government agencies, namely from Switzerland, Singapore, the United States, Hong Kong and Britain have initiated investigations on the 1MDB.

28. The press in Malaysia is heavily censored so that Malaysians have to rely on the foreign press. Yet when Malaysians discuss or write about the foreign reports, the Government (Inspector General of Police) invited people to make police reports so that the police can carry out questioning and investigation against the person concerned.

29. This is in contrast to the failure of the police to investigate the police report formally made against Najib, Jho Low and the reports to the Attorney General by Bank Negara and MACC. The Attorney General even threatens to amend the law to provide for jail for life with 10 strokes of the rotan against anyone "leaking" Government papers. This means that crimes committed in the administration can be hidden from the public.

30. The Attorney General claims that a part of the 2.6 billion Ringgit (about 2.3 billion) has been returned to the donor or donors. Apart from this statement no proof has been provided.

31. The people are suffering.

32. Najib's GST and increases in toll rates have increased the cost of living, forcing some businesses to close down and also causing foreign-owned industries to stop operations and relocate to other countries, creating unemployment.

33. Despite protests by the people Najib joined the US sponsored Trans Pacific Partnership (TPP) which erodes our freedom to make policies and laws suitable for our country.

34. Today Malaysia's image is badly tarnished. Apart from being classified as one of the 10 most corrupt countries, Malaysia is now regarded as undemocratic. There is denial of freedom of speech and freedom of the press and people live in fear of arrest and detentions. Security laws are enacted to allow the Prime Minister (and not the King) to declare security areas where anyone could be arrested and detained without trial and tried under procedures that violate normal and fair criminal justice standards.

35. On the other hand, where errors are made in applying these laws by Government officers, or where there is a blatant abuse of power, the people are unable to hold them accountable. Whistleblowers are harassed and punished instead of being protected. Other repressive laws are used to stifle free speech and legitimate comment about wrongdoings. The fundamental rights enshrined under the Federal Constitution have become meaningless.

36. For all these reasons, we, the undersigned citizens of Malaysia agree and support: a) The removal of Dato' Sri Najib Tun Razak as the Prime Minister of Malaysia through non-violent and legally permissible means; b) The removal of all those who have acted in concert with him; c) A repeal of all the recent laws and agreements that violate the fundamental rights guaranteed by the Federal Constitution and undermine policy choices and d) A restoration of the integrity of the institutions that have been undermined, such as the police, the MACC, Bank Negara and the PAC.

37. We call upon all Malaysians, irrespective of race, religion, political affiliation, creed or parties, young and old to join us in saving Malaysia from the Government headed by Dato' Sri Najib Tun Razak, to pave the way for much needed democratic and institutional reforms, and to restore the important principle of the separation of powers among the executive, legislature and judiciary which will ensure the independence, credibility, professionalism and integrity of our national institutions.

== See also ==
- 1Malaysia Development Berhad scandal
- Corruption in Malaysia
- Najib Razak's controversies
