= Security Offences (Special Measures) Act 2012 =

Malaysian law

Parliament of Malaysia
- Long title: An Act to provide for special measures relating to security offences for the purpose of maintaining public order and security and for connected matters.
- Citation: Act 747
- Territorial extent: Malaysia
- Passed by: Dewan Rakyat
- Passed: 17 April 2012
- Passed by: Dewan Negara
- Passed: 9 May 2012
- Royal assent: 18 June 2012
- Commenced: 22 June 2012
- Effective: 31 July 2012, P.U. (B) 256/2012

Legislative history

Initiating chamber: Dewan Rakyat
- Bill title: Security Offences (Special Measures) Bill 2012
- Bill citation: D.R. 15/2012
- Introduced by: Najib Razak, Prime Minister
- First reading: 10 April 2012
- Second reading: 16 April 2012
- Third reading: 17 April 2012

Revising chamber: Dewan Negara
- Bill title: Security Offences (Special Measures) Bill 2012
- Bill citation: D.R. 15/2012
- Member(s) in charge: Liew Vui Keong, Minister in the Prime Minister's Department
- First reading: 23 April 2012
- Second reading: 8 May 2012
- Third reading: 9 May 2012

Repeals
- Internal Security Act 1960 [Act 82]

Amended by
- Security Offences (Special Measures) (Amendment) Act 2015 [Act A1487]

Keywords
- Public order, special measure, security
- Status: In force

The Security Offences (Special Measures) Act 2012 (Malay: Akta Kesalahan Keselamatan (Langkah-Langkah Khas) 2012, abbreviated SOSMA) is a controversial law supposedly "to provide for special measures relating to security offences for the purpose of maintaining public order and security and for connected matters". The Act is to replace the 1960 Internal Security Act (Malaysia). The Act was introduced by Malaysian Prime Minister Najib Razak, approved in Parliament on 17 April 2012, given the Royal Assent on 18 June 2012 and Gazetted on 22 June 2012.

== Structure ==
The Security Offences (Special Measures) Act 2012, in its current form (4 June 2015), consists of 8 Parts containing 32 sections and 2 schedules (including 1 amendment).

- Part I: Preliminary
- Part II: Special Powers for Security Offences
- Part III: Special Procedures Relating to Electronic Monitoring Device
- Part IV: Special Procedures Relating to Sensitive Information
- Part V: Trial
- Part VI: Special Procedures Relating to Protected Witness
- Part VII: Evidence
- Part VIII: Miscellaneous
- Schedules

== Arrests Under the Act ==
Three people, including former ISA detainees Yazid Sufaat, Halimah Hussein and Mohd Hilmi Hasim, were the first ever detained under SOSMA in 2013. They were arrested for alleged incitement of terrorist acts. Following the 2013 Lahad Datu standoff, 104 Filipinos with suspected links to Jamalul Kiram III, one of the claimants to the throne of the Sultanate of Sulu, were detained under SOSMA. These included several family members of Kiram who had entered the state of Sabah using false identities.

== Controversies and issues ==
=== 2016 allegations and condemnations of abuse of power of the government and calls for abolition ===
In 2016, SOSMA was used to arrest 15 prominent civil rights activists, including Maria Chin Abdullah, after the Bersih 5 rally, leading to widespread condemnation from various parties, including Lawyers for Liberty director Eric Paulsen, 80 civil society organisations, the Malaysian Human Rights Commission and the US State Department. Several civil rights groups also said the use of SOSMA for an organiser of a peaceful rally was abuse of power and that the Malaysian government was trying to suppress dissent by using draconian laws. In 2016, 80 prominent civil rights group collectively called for the abolition of SOSMA, calling it a "draconian" law.

=== 2022 Dewan Rakyat parliamentary motion defeat and political instability ===
On 23 March 2022, Minister of Home Affairs Hamzah Zainudin tabled the motion in the Dewan Rakyat to carry on with the powers to detain suspects for up to 28 days without trial and to extend the enforcement of subsection 4(5) of SOSMA for another five years beginning from 31 July 2022. Hamzah said the preventive laws to detain suspects for such a long period is still necessary due to the seriousness of the crimes it intended to thwart. However, it suffered from a historic defeat after the Dewan Rakyat voted against it following a heated debate among MPs by a majority of only 2 votes with 86 votes against it and 84 for it while 50 other MPs being absent.

Following the defeat of the government's motion, the Communications and Multimedia Minister Annuar Musa and UMNO secretary-general Ahmad Maslan accused the opposition Pakatan Harapan coalition of violating the memorandum of understanding signed on 13 September 2021 between the government and the opposition. The Democratic Action Party secretary-general Anthony Loke disagreed, saying that the opposition decision not to support the extension of SOSMA was not a violation of the memorandum of understanding between the government and Pakatan Harapan. UMNO deputy president Mohamad Hassan called for the MOU between the government and Pakatan Harapan to be re-evaluated following the motion's failure while UMNO President Ahmad Zahid Hamidi called for the MOU's cancellation. Despite the defeat of the SOSMA bill, Wan Junaidi Tuanku Jaafar, a Minister in the Prime Minister's Department, confirmed that the MOU between the government and Pakatan Harapan would not be terminated.

Inspector-General of Police Acryl Sani Abdullah Sani noted that Bukit Aman would use existing laws including the Criminal Procedure Code (CPC) for cases under SOSMA after 31 July 2022. These included cases that were considered offences under Chapter VI of the Penal Code (crimes against country), Chapter VIA of the Penal Code (terrorism offences), Chapter VIB of the Penal Code (organised crime offences), Chapter IIIA of the Anti-Human Trafficking and Anti Smuggling of Migrant Act 2007 and Special Measures Combatting terrorism overseas. Acryl Sani also confirmed that SOSMA would no longer include the powers to detain people for up to 28 days after 31 July 2022. It involves those detained in complex security cases including offences under Chapter VI of the Penal Code (crimes against country), Chapter VIA of the Penal Code (terrorism offences), Chapter VIB of the Penal Code (organised crime offences), Chapter IIIA of the Anti-Human Trafficking and Anti Smuggling of Migrant Act 2007 and Special Measures Combatting terrorism overseas".

Nevertheless, political analysts, Opposition MPs and Minister in the Prime Minister's Department in charge of Parliament and Law Wan Junaidi have sought to minimise the defeat of the vote by arguing that it did not entail a loss of confidence in the government since the bill was not a supply bill or part of the federal budget. Oh Ei Sun, a senior fellow at the Singapore Institute of International Affairs, attributed the defeat to the negligence of duties of the government parliamentary whips. Andrew Khoo, co-chair of the Malaysian Bar Council's Constitutional Law Committee, said the government may still retable the motion as well as it is not part of the MoU and whatever motions tabled must be firstly agreed by both sides before its tabling.

A vote recount saw Speaker of the Dewan Rakyat Azhar Azizan Harun amending the voting results to 85 votes for and 86 votes against but it was still unable to overturn the results as it was still defeated by 1 vote. This revelation came to light after Jempol MP Salim Shariff was said to have mistakenly marked Besut MP Idris Jusoh as absent when votes were being tallied on the motion. Meanwhile, Lembah Pantai MP Fahmi Fadzil expressed dismay at the manually done mistakes and called upon Azhar to improve the voting process system. In response, Azhar assured MPs that the CCTVs were examined to determine if Idris was actually in the House before the changes were made. He also agreed that there should be improvements to the system and expressed support to implementing virtual or hybrid settings at Parliament.

After being blamed for the defeat, Fahmi criticised several government MPs for their absences during the SOSMA vote. In response Pekan MP Najib Razak said that he was in court during the vote. Meanwhile, Pontian MP Ahmad Maslan said that he had been told by several parliamentary officers that voting had not been scheduled for that day.

On 25 March 2022, Hamzah confirmed that the re-tabling of the SOSMA motion could be delayed till 2023 due to Parliamentary standing orders. Hamzah criticised government MPs for allegedly leaving Dewan Rakyat before the SOSMA vote out of personal dislike for him and accused Opposition MPs of "playing politics". Hamzah also claimed that the failure of the motion would encourage criminals and undermine national security. Following Hamazh's announcement about the delay in re-tabling the SOSMA motion, Co-chair of the Bar Council Constitutional Law Committee Andrew Khoo stated that "unless there is a substantive motion for rescission, it cannot be reconsidered." He said that the five-year period for detaining suspects up to 28 days would have lapsed by 2023. Khoo also reiterated the Bar Council's view that the 28-day detention period should be shortened by the Government.
