= Bersih 5 rally =

- Logo of the rally used by Bersih organisers
- Date: 19 November 2016
- Location: Jalan Bangsar to Dataran Merdeka, Kuala Lumpur (Bersih Convoy: Kangar, Johor Bahru, Kota Bahru, Lumut, Sandakan and Miri)
- Goals: For a New Malaysia; Free and Fair Elections; A Clean Government; The Right to Dissent; Strengthening the Parliamentary Democracy; Empowering Sabah and Sarawak; Resignation of Prime Minister Najib Razak
- Status: Held

Parties
Bersih	Red Shirts; Orange Shirts	Royal Malaysia Police

Lead figures
Maria Chin Abdullah (detained); The Bersih Steering Committee; Mahathir Mohamad	Jamal Yunos (detained); Datuk R.S. Thanenthiran (MMSP president)	Khalid Abu Bakar

Number
250,000 (Media estimate); 150,000 (Police estimate); 1,400 Bersih security personnel	2,500–4,000	7,000 officers

Casualties
- Arrested: 12+

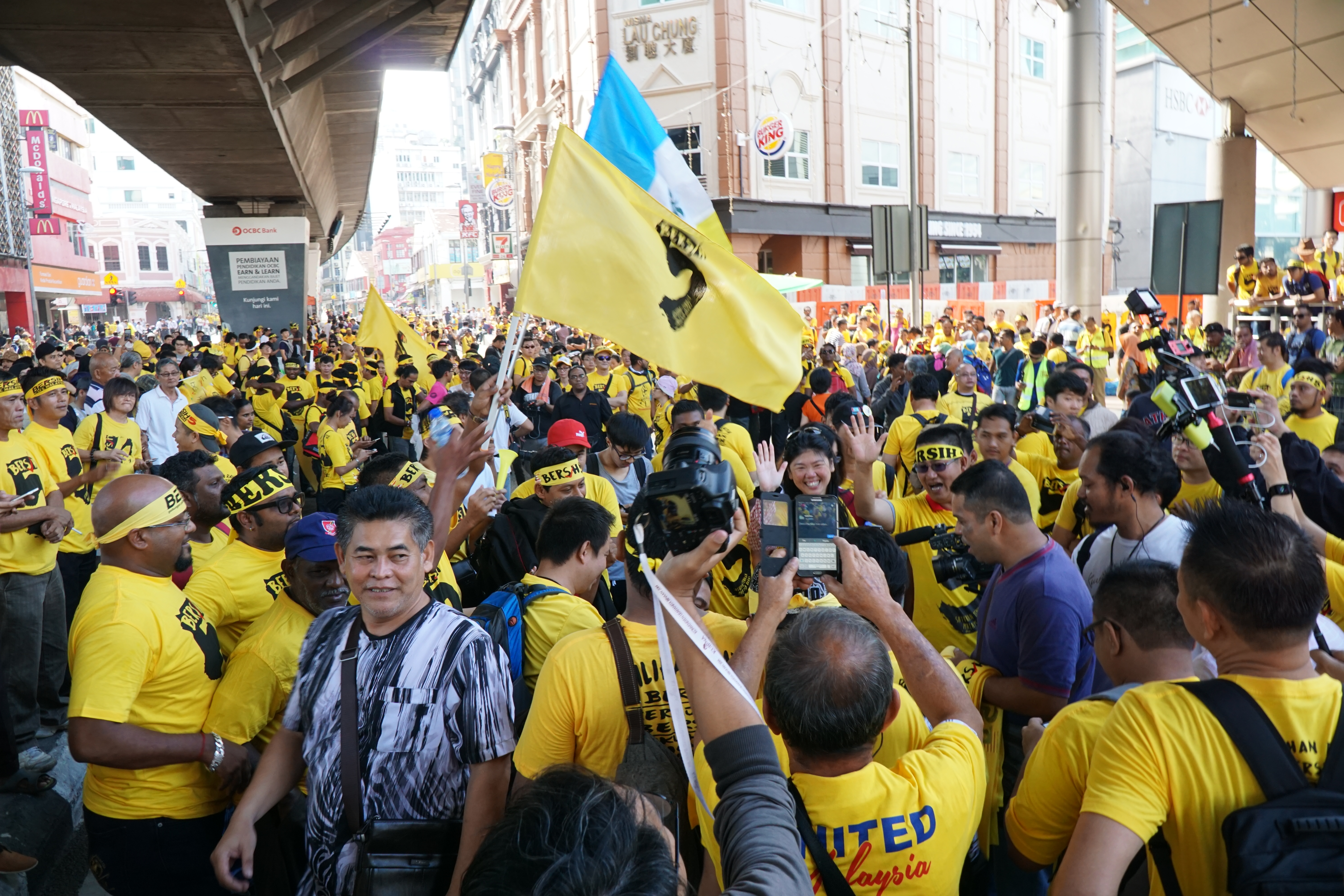

The Bersih 5 rally (also known by its tagline: Combine our energy – New Malaysia) was a peaceful democratic protest in Malaysia, supported by the Coalition for Clean and Fair Elections (Bersih), which took place on 19 November 2016. The rally was held calling for a new and cleaner electoral system in Malaysia. A Bersih convoy was also launched and targeted all parts of Malaysia to raise awareness of the current democratic problems nationwide.

== Background ==
Incumbent Malaysian prime minister Najib Razak has denied any wrongdoing amidst the ongoing 1Malaysia Development Berhad scandal and former premier Mahathir Mohamad has come out in support of pro Bersih campaigners.

Steven Gan, an editor of an online news website Malaysiakini was charged in court under the Malaysian Communications and Multimedia Commission Act for the reporting of Prime Minister Najib and 1Malaysia Development Berhad, leading up to the rally.

=== Red Shirts ===
The Red Shirts were basically formed to oppose the activities of Bersih, especially its criticisms of the government and to support the government. Many members of the Red Shirts are UMNO, which is the ruling party in Malaysia.

The pro government group led by Jamal Yunos indicated that the Red Shirts would confront the yellow shirt Bersih protesters during the stipulated rally on 19 November 2016. In a prelude encounter, Jamal Yunos was injured with his nose bloodied in Ampang during a filmed scuffle with the police, with Jamal shouting that he was punched by the police. He later changed his statement because he was threatened by the government, claiming he was punched by a Bersih supporter.

== Pre-rally plans ==
=== Bersih convoy ===
Bersih organised a convoy of vehicles to tour parts of Peninsular Malaysia and the states of Sabah and Sarawak to disseminate information to the public about the Bersih's goals regarding institutional reforms and creating awareness about the 1MDB scandal. Throughout their nationwide roadshow in Peninsular Malaysia, the Bersih convoy had to endure harassment from anti-Bersih groups such as the Red Shirts and the police.

== Pre-rally arrests ==
The Malaysian police, during their raid on Bersih's office in Petaling Jaya arrested Bersih chairperson Maria Chin Abdullah and secretariat Mandeep Singh for their part in organising the rally. Maria Chin was arrested under section 124C of the Penal Code, which covers attempts to commit activity detrimental to parliamentary democracy, and detained under the Security Offences Act 2012, which allowed the police to hold her for up to 28 days. She was released on 28 November 2016, after 11 days in detention. In November 2017, she said the police had told her that all investigations into her and Bersih 2.0 had been closed, which she described as proof that her detention had been without basis. Ronnie Liu, an opposition leader of the Democratic Action Party was arrested as well on charges on attempting a riot. Anthony Loke, another member of DAP was also arrested in an investigation on his speech calling for the removal of Prime Minister Najib. S Arulchelvan, an opposition leader from Parti Sosialis Malaysia was arrested in Brickfields, Kuala Lumpur. Another member of the Bersih committee, Hishamuddin Rais was arrested a few hours before the rally began. Bersih officials have condemned the arrest as a blatant abuse of power and harassment by the authorities.

The leader of the Red Shirts, a group opposing Bersih and their Yellow Shirt followers, Jamal Yunos was arrested a few hours before the Bersih rally began.

== Rally incidents ==
The counter-rally by the Red Shirts ended prematurely after they were unable to get past the police blockade to confront the Bersih rally-goers, with a majority of them dispersing at Padang Merbok.

== Aftermath ==
Even though the protests ended peacefully, the arrests against Bersih protestors such as People's Justice Party (Malaysia)'s Tian Chua and Zuraida Kamaruddin were conducted.

== Reactions ==
=== Prime minister ===
Then Prime Minister Datuk Seri Najib Razak who was in Tokyo, said that Malaysians should respect the law and avoid chaos and physical clashes. He also claimed that Malaysians should elect their leaders without having to protest as it was not Malaysia's culture, despite the fact that right of peaceful assembly (which Bersih exercised) is legally provided for in Malaysia.

=== Malaysian Police ===
Inspector General of Police, Khalid Abu Bakar stated that Bersih 5 does not fulfil the Section 10(c) and Section 11 of Peaceful Assembly Act 2012 as there was no consent letter was produced for the venue of the rally, Dataran Merdeka.

=== Non-governmental organisations ===
Human Rights Watch and Amnesty International have condemned the spate of arrests by the government of Malaysian activists as a form of intimidation and harassment against dissent.
