= Red Pencil protest =

2014 Rally held in Kuala Lumpur, Malaysia

The Red Pencil protest was a rally that was held in Kuala Lumpur, Malaysia by media personnel, activists and other supporters on 4 January 2014. The rally was organised by the Angry Media Movement (GERAMM), in response to the Malaysian government's restrictions on media freedom and the recent suspension of a weekly news publication, The Heat. The suspension of The Heat is widely believed in media circles by the Malaysian Home Ministry due to their reporting on the spending habits of Prime Minister Datuk Seri Najib Razak and his wife Datin Seri Rosmah Mansor.

== Rally ==
The police were monitoring the protests, even though they did not give permission to the organisers to gather in the event as required under Peaceful Assembly Act 2012. Around 100 to 200 protestors gathered around the Bar Council offices in Kuala Lumpur and began marching to Masjid Jamek LRT station. Also involved with the protests were lawyers representing the Malaysian Bar Council and opposition members of parliament. Observers include Bersih, Ambiga Sreenevasan and social activist Datuk Paduka Marina Mahathir. At the station the protestors began shouting slogans calling for freedom of the press and made their demands cleared, as well as symbolically breaking a red pencil.

== Protest demands ==
The protestors underlined several specific demands for the government, political parties and the media such as:

1. Withdraw the suspension of The Heat weekly allow it to operate
2. Re-investigate incidences of police brutality against media practitioners during the Bersih 3.0 rally in 2012.
3. Do away with the requirement of a publication permit mandatory under the Printing Presses and Publications Act (PPPA) 1984.
4. Allow all media to cover government events and access to public buildings for news gathering purposes.
5. They also called for the government and political parties to give full access to government and public events, and to apologise over alleged breaches of media freedom.
