= Charles Hector Fernandez =

Malaysian human rights advocate and activist

- Born: July 4, 1971 (age 55); Temerloh, Temerloh District, Pahang, Malaysia
- Other name: Charles Hector
- Education: University of Malaya; University of London (LLB)
- Occupations: Lawyer and activist
- Known for: Human rights advocacy

Charles Hector Fernandez (born 4 July 1971) is a Malaysian human rights advocate and activist.

== Early life ==
He was born in Temerloh, Temerloh District, Pahang, Malaysia, on 4 July 1971, and his parents are C. S. Fernandez and May Florence Gomez.

His primary schooling was in Sekolah Rendah Jalan Bahagia, Temerloh. His lower secondary education was in Sekolah Menengah Rendah Jalan Bahagia (Form 1–3), and thereafter Sekolah Menengah Abu Bakar (Form 4–5). He then continued his upper secondary education in Sekolah Sultan Abu Bakar, Kuantan, Pahang during which he also held the position of President of the Sixth Form Society.

After that, he was admitted to University of Malaya, where he pursued a bachelor's degree in Science (Genetics). He was elected into the University of Malaya Students Union, and held the position of Welfare Secretary. He was also a founder member of the Social Service Club (Persatuan Perkhidmatan Masyarakat) - an initiative of unifying students irrespective of racial, religious and political differences.

After graduation he worked with the National Office for Human Development, then SUARAM and thereafter has been a lawyer. In 1993, he was instrumental in developing and getting "The Malaysian Human Rights Charter" which was by adopted by some 50 NGOS in 1993.

In 1994, he obtained his Bachelor of Law (LLB) from University of London, and Certificate of Legal Practice in 1995. He was called to the Bar in October 1996. His master was the late Haji Sulaiman Abdullah. He has been a practicing lawyer since then.

== Malaysian Bar ==
He was called to the Malaysian Bar in 1996. He was instrumental in developing the Malaysian Bar Legal Aid Dock-Brief programme. The Dock Brief programme was developed to ensure that all those brought to court to be charged, who do not yet have a lawyer, do receive free legal advice and legal representation. If the accused plead guilty, they will be assisted with regards to mitigation. And if they do claim trial, then they will be assisted with regard to bail applications.

Fernandez, in his second attempt, was elected a member of the Bar Council 2005/2006. At that time, young lawyers below 7 years standing could not run for Bar Council Elections. He was the chairman of the committee for the elimination of discrimination from 2005 to 2007.

Fernandez has been instrumental in moving the Bar to be more involved in a variety of human rights issues, which has been done also by the moving of Motions that were discussed and passed as Bar Resolutions. Amongst which are the following that have been adopted as Resolutions of the Malaysian Bar are:

- Motion on Elimination of All Forms of Discrimination (22 October 2005)
- Motion on Abolishment of the Death Penalty (18 March 2006)
- Motion for withdrawal of Emergency Proclamations, and repeal of laws enacted under such Proclamations like Emergency (Public Order and Prevention of Crime) Ordinance 1969 and the Essential (Security Cases) Regulations 1975, against torture and other matters related (17 March 2007)
- Resolution on maintaining a just employment relationship, worker and trade union rights in Malaysia (27 February 2012)
- Resolution for the Provision of Legal Aid and Assistance to Workers (20 March 2015)
- These Resolutions, adopted by members at an AGM, direct the work and the positions taken by the Malaysian Bar, and as such as resulted greater involvement of the Bar on a wider variety of issues and concerns.

== Human rights defender ==
As a human rights activist, Fernandez has been involved in a wide range of human rights concerns including freedom of assembly, urban settler rights, worker and trade union rights, women rights, indigenous peoples rights, land rights, administration of justice and also migrant/refugee rights.

Fernandez is also one of the coordinators of the Malaysians Against Death Penalty & Torture (MADPET) together with N. Surendran and Salbiah Ahmad. MADPET is also currently a member of the Anti-Death Penalty Asia Network (ADPAN). Fernandez was a member of ADPAN(Anti Death Penalty Asia Network)'s Transition Group when it became an independent and democratic Network, and he also served as a member of the first elected executive committee (2014–2016).

Fernandez is also a coordinator of the WH4C (Workers Hub For Change), and also NAMM (Network of Action for Migrants in Malaysia). He represents WH4C in the GoodElectronics Network Steering Committee.

Fernandez was also in the secretariat for the Campaign for the release of about 106 persons who were arrested under the Internal Security Act (Malaysia) in October 1987 known as Operation Lalang, and also the campaign for release of those arrested in Singapore under Operation Spectrum.

Fernandez was involved in the development of [SUARAM], whereby he was also the 2nd coordinator after Julian Jeyaseelan. He was involved in the initiative to develop a Malaysian Human Rights Charter, realizing that there was no common understanding and position about human rights in Malaysia amongst the many different human rights groups, NGOs and political parties. The process involved a questionnaire on various aspects of human rights in Malaysia was distributed to about 450 Malaysian organizations for feedbacks. As the result, the Malaysian Human Rights Charter 1993 was produced and endorsed by some 50 NGOs which include human rights organizations, trade unions, academic bodies, women's groups, environmental organizations, consumer associations and other non-state sectors. In May 1999, another initiative to develop further the Charter, but sadly this process ended with the endorsement of much lesser groups - making the 1993 Charter(printed and published in 1994), the more important document that saw the endorsement of the more than 50 groups.

He is also founder member of the Society for Christian Reflection (SCR) and Pusat KOMAS. He was also the treasurer of the National Human Rights Society(HAKAM)for four years. He is also a member of JUST and ALIRAN.

Fernandez was also involved in the production of the 1st Human Rights Education Pack (HRE Pack) for the Asia-Pacific region, which was published be the Asia-Pacific Regional Resource Center for Human Rights Education (ARRC) in 1995. He was also then a Council member of ARRC.

Charles Hector Fernandez is also still a steering committee member of GoodElectronics Network, and is also active in Clean Clothes Campaign.

== HRD sued by Japanese MNC ==
On 14 February 2011, Fernandez was sued for RM10 million (US$3.2 million) by a Japanese MNC, Asahi Kosei, in Malaysia for highlighting alleged human rights violations affecting some 30 Burmese migrant workers who were workers at the said company's factories. Asahi Kosei says that it is not responsible for these workers and all that happened to them by reason that these workers were not their 'employees' - but were workers supplied by an 'outsourcing agent'(a labour/manpower supplier). The threat and the suit against this Human Rights Defender resulted in great protest from all quarters, both nationally and internationally. This issue was also raised in the UK Parliament, and the trial was closely monitored by the European Union's and many other countries. On 25 August 2011, the case was settled. Fernandez was also nominated for the inaugural SUHAKAM Human Rights Award in 2011.

== Investigated for sedition - 2016 ==
On 31 March 2016, Charles Hector Fernandez, together with Francis Pereira and R. Shanmugam was called up by Polis DiRaja Malaysia ("PDRM") to be present at the Bukit Aman police station for investigation under the Sedition Act, in connection with the "Motion on the Attorney General, Public Prosecutor and Improvement of Public Perspective of Administration of Justice in Malaysia", that was tabled at the 70th Annual General Meeting of the Malaysian Bar held on 19 March 2016, and which was adopted by an overwhelming majority. The police also called on the Bar's Secretary, Ms Karen Cheah to be present.

"We are still committed to upholding the course of justice, no amount of harassment or intimidation will stop us because ultimately, our position is that as lawyer and a member of the Bar, we have a right and also a duty, and an obligation, to uphold the cause of justice and bring about reforms to the cause of justice...It's not just the obligation of lawyers but of each Malaysian to improve things."

The case has yet to be dropped, even though there has been no apparent further action on the part of the police and/or the prosecutors.

== Contempt of Court Threat for letter written on behalf of client - 2021 ==
Fernandez acting on behalf of 8 community human rights defenders protesting logging of the forest reserve adjacent to their Malay village, was subject to an application to commence contempt proceedings by the Plaintiffs, Logging Contractors, against Fernandez and his 8 clients for a letter written by him on behalf of clients. Malaysia: Attempts to intimidate human rights lawyer Charles Hector. On the date fixed for the contempt hearing, the Plaintiff suddenly withdrew the application.

== Sources ==
- The Star
- Malaysian Bar
- Malaysian Bar
- Suaram
- Charles Hector
- Malaysians Against Death Penalty & Torture
- Free Malaysia Today, 21/1/2011
- guardian.co.uk, 24/1/2011
- AHRC - MALAYSIA: A human rights lawyer and public interest advocate faces threats of legal action for blogging about a company allegedly violating rights of migrant workers
- Voice of Burma, 16/2/2011 - $3.2m lawsuit for defending Burmese migrants
- Human Rights Commission(AHRC)
- In Defence of Charles Hector
- UK Parliament - Early day motion 1800
- MALAYSIA: A human rights lawyer and public interest advocate faces threats of legal action for blogging about a company allegedly violating rights of migrant workers
- "Malaysia: Lawsuit Against Rights Defender Impedes Public Debate". Human Rights Watch. June 22, 2011.
- Article 19 - Charles Hector Defamation Case Cause for Concern
- ITUC(International Trade Union Confederation) - Malaysia: Japanese Firm Must Drop Defamation Charges Against Human Rights Defender and Respect the Rights of Migrant Workers
- Clean Clothes Campaign(CCC) Hitachi Supplier sues Malaysian Labour Rights Activist
- GoodElectronics - Urgent appeal for human rights defender Charles Hector
- FIDH - Concern about the trial against human rights defender Charles Hector Fernandez
- FrontLine Defenders - Malaisie: MISE A JOUR – Le procès du défenseur des droits humains M. Charles Hector Fernandez ajourné jusqu'en août 2011
- FIDH - Libel suits undermine the legitimate work of human rights defenders - Defamation case against human rights defender Charles Hector Fernandez ended with a settlement
- SUHAKAM (Malaysian Human Rights Commission Annual Report 2011) - Charles Hector candidate for inaugural Human Rights Award
- The story of labour and workers’ struggle in Malaysia
- Undeterred by sedition probe, lawyers vow to fight on. Malay Mail. 31/3/2016
- Malaysia: sedition investigation against Malaysian Bar members constitutes inappropriate interference-ICJ(International Commission of Jurist)
