= Conservatism in Malaysia =

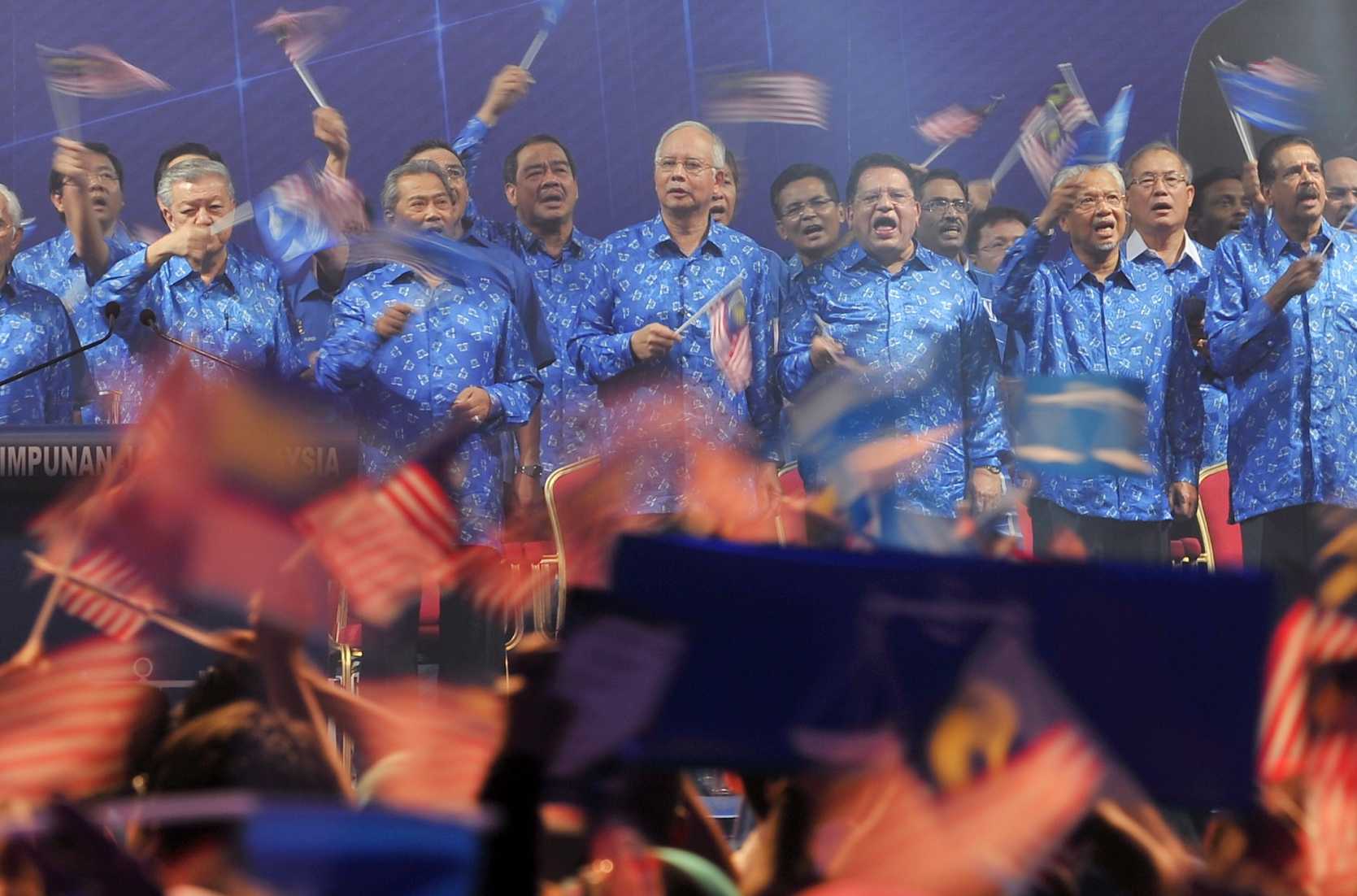
Prime minister Najib Razak at the launch of Barisan Nasional's manifesto in 2013.

Conservatism in Malaysia is an ideology associated with Barisan Nasional and Malay-based political parties in general. "Right-wing" or "conservative" parties defend Ketuanan Melayu, or Malay political overlordship, and support the propagation of Islam. Economically, Malaysian conservatives support the continuation of affirmative action schemes, namely policies like the New Economic Policy.

== Overview ==
Islamic conservatism has existed in Malaysia since the 1960s, with many Muslim groups taking conservative stances on human rights, women's rights and LGBT rights. Conservatism is perceived to have increased in the country in the 21st century. Close Malaysia–Saudi Arabia relations are thought to have in part influenced this trend. Conservative Muslim values have occasionally influenced educational institutions.
