= Charles Hector =

Charles Hector may refer to:

- Charles Hector Fernandez (born 1971), Malaysian human rights advocate and activist
- Charles Henri Hector, Count of Estaing (1729–1794), French military officer and writer

== See also ==
- Charles Jean d'Hector (1722–1808), French aristocrat and naval officer
