= Bersih =

Group of Malaysian non-governmental organisations

Bersih The Coalition for Clean and Fair Elections
- Headquarters: 46050 Petaling Jaya, Selangor, Malaysia
- Chairperson: Muhammad Faisal bin Abdul Aziz (2023 - present)
- Deputy Chairperson: Lee See Kiang (Kelvin) (2026 - present)
- Website: bersih.org

The Coalition for Clean and Fair Elections (Malay: Gabungan Pilihanraya Bersih dan Adil) or Bersih (meaning clean in Malay) is a coalition of non-governmental organisations (NGOs) which seeks to reform the current electoral system in Malaysia to improve its democracy by ensuring free, clean and fair elections among other reforms.

The idea of Bersih was initiated by five opposition parties in 2005 which later included other NGOs in this as well.

It was officially formed on 23 November 2006 as a joint communiqué that comprised leaders from political parties, civil society groups and NGOs. Bersih accused the Election Commission under Prime Minister's Department for manipulating the electoral process to give an unfair advantage to the ruling National Front coalition. Bersih claimed that the electoral roll was marred by irregularities such as gerrymandering, phantom voters, malapportionment and postal vote frauds. On 10 November 2007, Bersih organised the first rally with 10,000 to 40,000 turnout and held a public demonstration at Dataran Merdeka, Kuala Lumpur. Supporters of Bersih were urged to wear yellow T-shirts as a symbol of protest. The rally was often credited for the shift in political landscape in 2008 general election, when the incumbent Barisan Nasional coalition failed to obtain a two-thirds supermajority for the first time since 1969.

In April 2010, the coalition was relaunched as an entirely civil society movement ("Bersih 2.0") unaffiliated to any political party. On 19 June 2011, former president of the Bar Council, Dato' Ambiga Sreenevasan became the chairperson of the coalition. In 2011 and 2012, two more rallies (Bersih 2.0 and Bersih 3.0) were organised seeing that the demands for the electoral reforms have not been met by the Electoral Commission. In 2022, the organisation reverted back to its original name "Bersih" to avoid confusion.

== History ==
Bersih started out as a Joint Action Committee for Electoral Reform which was formed in July 2005. In the following year September 2006, an Electoral Reform Workshop was held in Kuala Lumpur whereby the various leaders from political parties, civil society groups and NGOs, including Wan Azizah Wan Ismail, Lim Guan Eng, PAS, Nasharudin Mat Isa, Teresa Kok, Syed Shahir Syed Mohamud among others, came together to formulate a joint communiqué. The main objective of this meeting is to advocate for a clean and fair election in Malaysia.

=== 2007 Bersih rally ===
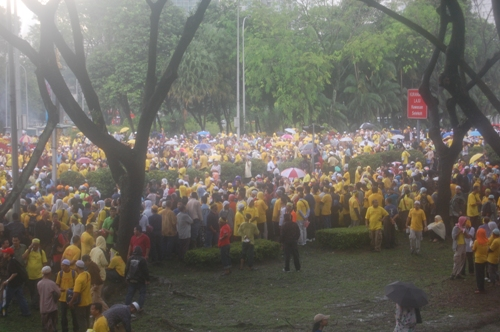
Rallying crowd in front of the Istana Negara.

On Saturday 10 November 2007, Bersih held the first mass rally to make four demands to ensure a clean and fair electoral process in Malaysia:

1. Clean up of the electoral roll
2. Use of indelible ink
3. Abolition of postal voting for military and police personnel
4. Free and fair access to mass media for all parties

The rally took place in the area of Kuala Lumpur and Petaling Jaya around Dataran Merdeka (Independence Square) and Istana Negara (The National Palace). Bersih estimated the turnout to be at least 30,000, while the official claimed there were 10,000 protesters. Yellow shirts and ribbons were used as the symbol of protest as yellow is also the colour for citizen actions worldwide and for press freedom movement. A memorandum containing the four demands was submitted to the Yang di-Pertuan Agong, Malaysia's head of state, during the rally.

Malaysian police refused to issue a permit for the rally, rendering the rally illegal. Tear gas and chemical-laced water cannon were used by the riot police to disperse the crowd. 245 people were detained following the protest.

Following the initial rally, Bersih indicated it may hold another street demonstration if government extended the tenure of Election Commission (EC) chairperson Abdul Rashid Abdul Rahman. On 20 November 2007, Minister in the Prime Minister's Department Nazri Aziz tabled a first reading of the Constitution (Amendment) Bill 2007 that sought to extend the retirement age of members of Election Commission (EC) from 65 to 66. Parliament passed legislation on 11 December to increase EC members' retirement age from 65 to 66.

=== 2011 Bersih 2.0 rally ===
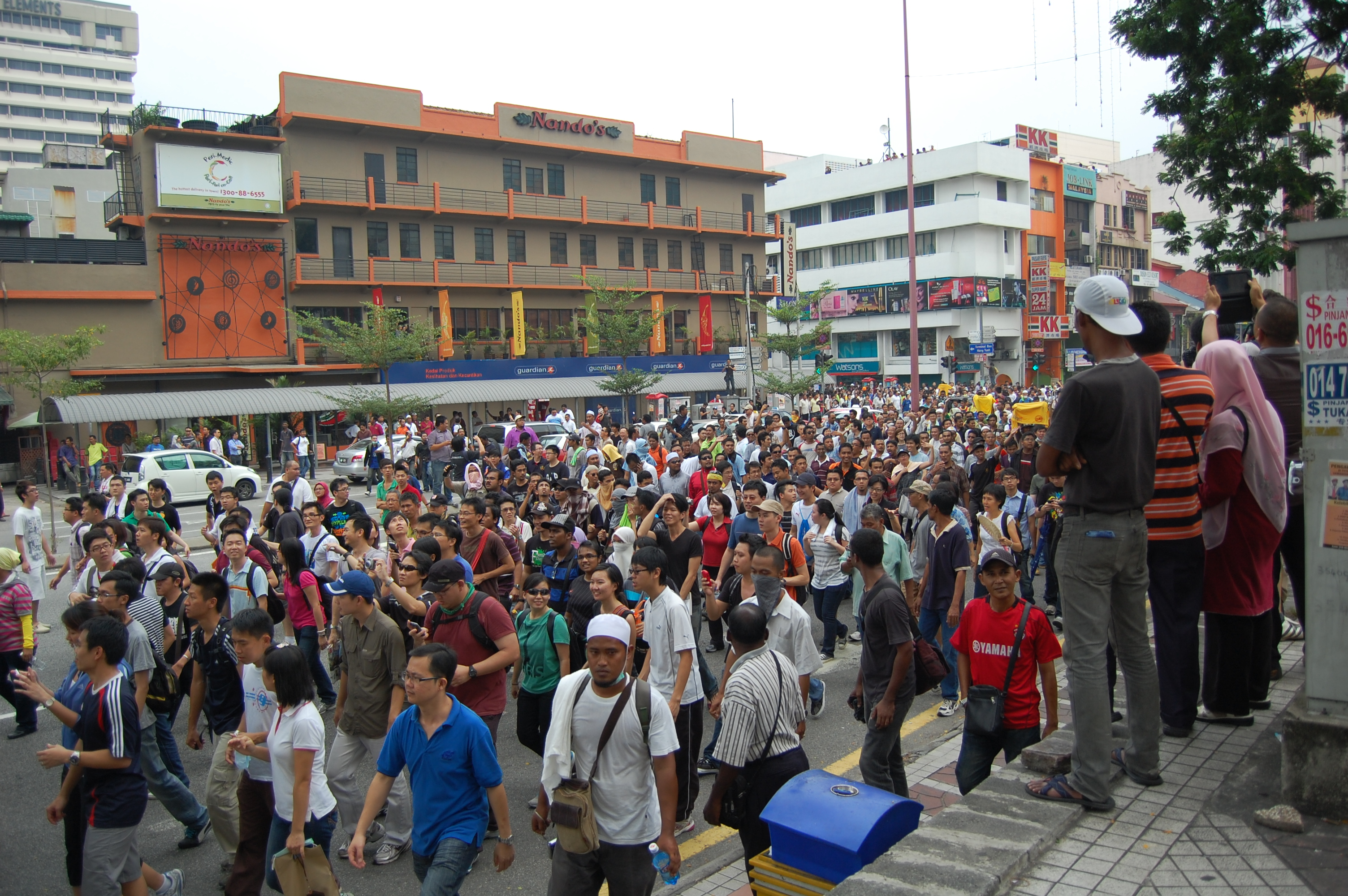
Protesters marching the streets of Kuala Lumpur peacefully before the police confronted them.

The 2007 rally had raised Malaysian citizens' awareness to the irregularities and controversies in the electoral system. Ahead of the anticipated 2012 13th general election, Bersih scheduled a second public demonstration at Kuala Lumpur on 9 July 2011. Bersih 2.0 rally, also called the Walk for Democracy, called for eight points, including the four demands that remained not met in the 2008 general election:

1. Clean up of the electoral roll
2. Reform of postal ballot
3. Use of indelible ink
4. Minimum 21 days of campaign period
5. Free and fair access to mass media for all parties
6. Strengthening of public institutions
7. No corruption
8. No dirty politics

Bersih 2.0 was endorsed by 62 NGOs and joined by rallies in more than 30 international cities by oversea Malaysians in solidarity. The rally was again denied a permit. Plans for the demonstration were extensively criticised by the government and pro-government media. Police set up multiple road blocks around Kuala Lumpur and arrested 225 Bersih supporters in the lead-up to the event.

After being granted an audience with the Yang di-Pertuan Agong to discuss the issue, Bersih subsequently agreed on 5 July 2011 to move the rally from the streets to Stadium Merdeka. Estimates of the turnout on 9 July 2011 ranged from 10,000 to 50,000. The police deployed tear gas and water cannons to break up the protest and arrested more than 1600 protesters, including Ambiga and several event organisers and opposition figures.

=== 2012 Bersih 3.0 rally ===
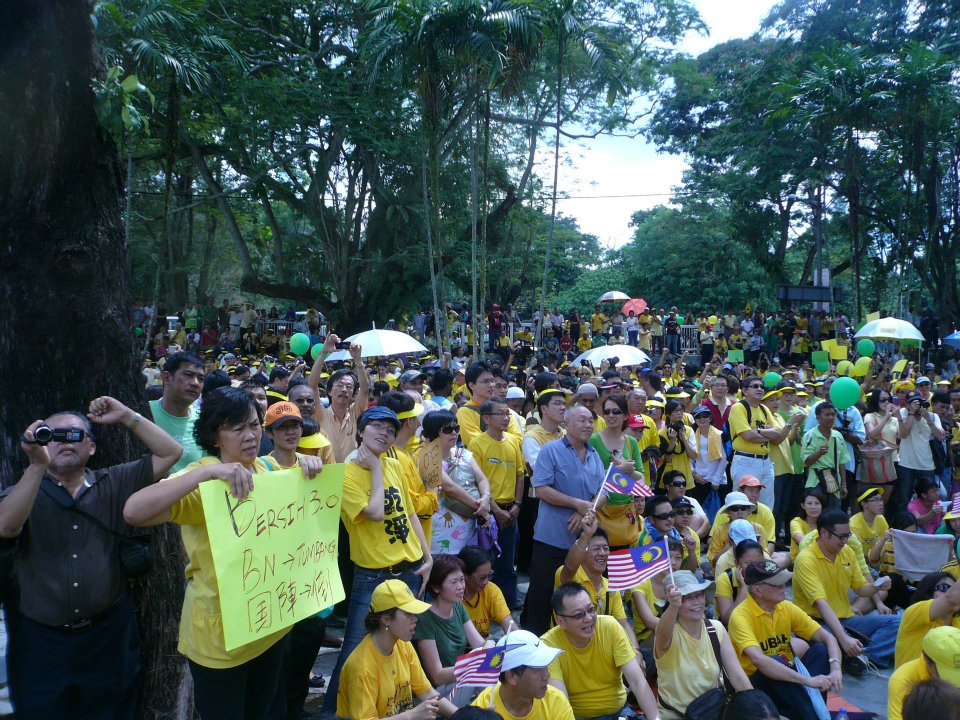
A scene from the Bersih 3.0 rally in Polo Ground, Ipoh.

Following the Bersih 2.0 demonstration, the Malaysian government set up Parliamentary Select Committee (PSC) on 2 October 2011 to respond to the electoral issues. In early April 2012, PSC released a report with 22 recommendations to improve the electoral system. The report was received and passed by the Dewan Rakyat (House of Representatives) on 3 April 2012 according to the voice of the majority without debate. An opposition minority report was proposed to be included but was rejected by the Speaker of the Dewan Rakyat.

Bersih was unsatisfied with the PSC reports as (i) the existing Election Commission was tasked to carry out the recommendations; (ii) many of the recommendations asked for a lengthy implementation period; (iii) many allegations of electoral frauds were not acknowledged in the report. In light of the issues, the third public demonstration, namely the Bersih 3.0 rally, was announced and took place on 28 April 2012 at Dataran Merdeka. The Bersih 3.0 rally was a sit-down protest (Duduk Bantah in Malay). In addition to the eight previous demands, seven of which had been approved by the government, it called for:

1. Resignation of the existing Electoral Commission
2. Implementation of the 8 demands before the 13th general election
3. Observation of the 13th general election by international observers

Bersih 3.0 was endorsed by 84 NGOs. In particular, it was joined by Himpunan Hijau (Green Assembly), a civil movement protesting the Lynas rare earth project in Malaysia. In addition to the main rally at Kuala Lumpur, smaller rallies were held in 10 other cities in Malaysia, as well as in 34 other countries.

The protest began as a peaceful demonstration allowed by the government under the Peaceful Assembly Act. However, the protestors later breached the agreed terms of the protest and began storming restricted areas, which led to the police deploying tear gas and water cannon against the protestors. Multiple video footages showed that when the chaos began, the police initially refrained from takinig action until a few minutes after the breach, when police began to scatter the crowd. Tear gas and water cannon targeted the exit points and the middle of the crowd.

The protest had among the most violent outcomes in Malaysian history, with protestors and journalists receiving a harsh response from the police using tear gas and water cannons. It was noted to be the second largest democratic protest in Malaysia, with independent sources citing 100,000 participants, second to the 1998 Reformasi protests, which analysts describe as a bad moment for the ruling government due to the strong opposition. In the end, 60 demonstrators, 20 policemen, and multiple bystanders including journalists were injured during the entire ordeal.

=== Bersih People's Tribunal ===
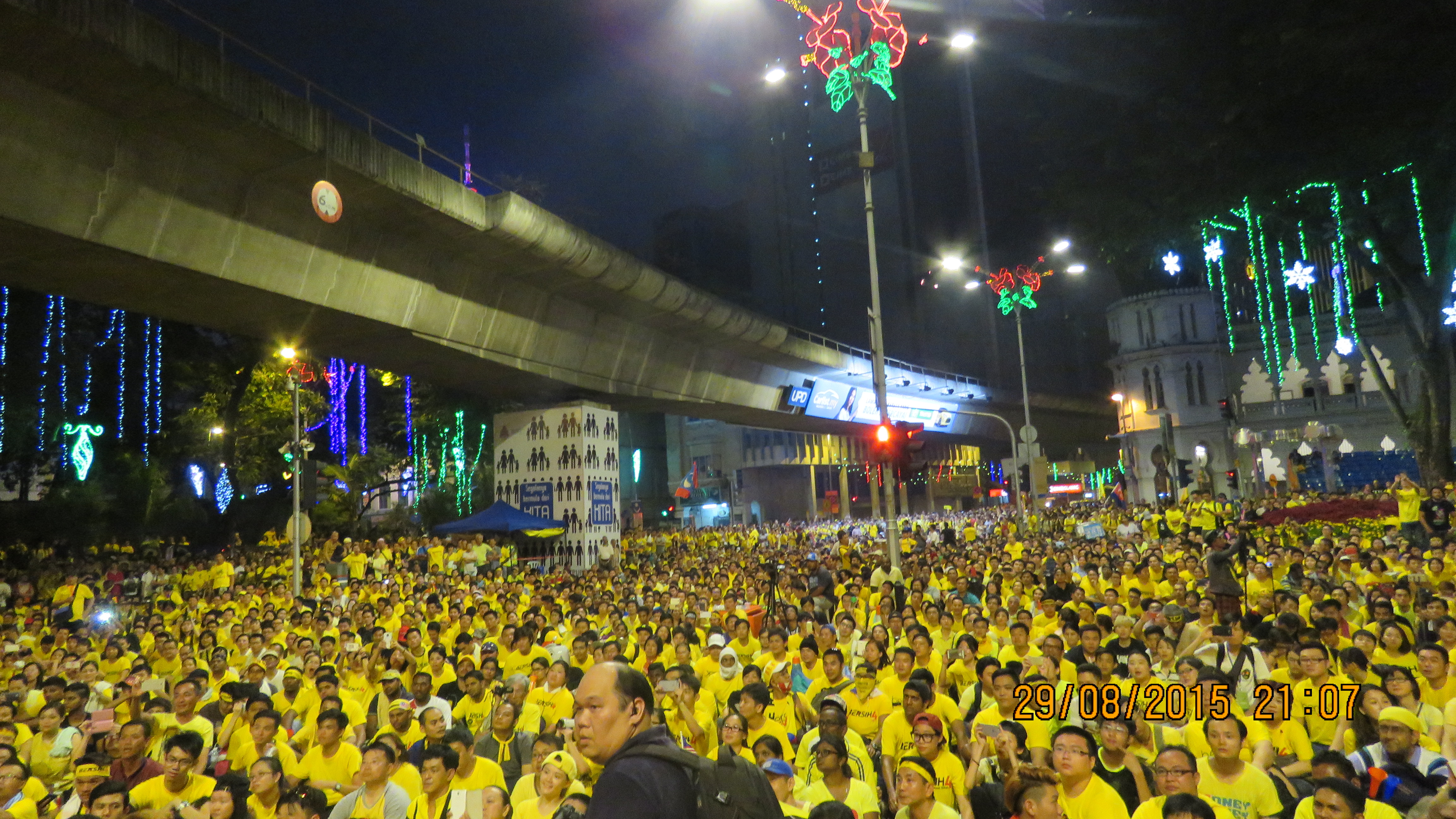
Crowd listening to Maria's speech in Merdeka Square, Kuala Lumpur

A tribunal was organised by Bersih on 18–21 September 2013 in regards to the general elections that was held on 5 May 2013, whereby invited witnesses gave testimonies on the irregularities and incidents of fraud. There were also calls for Election Commission to resign due to the way electoral demarcations were formed in past redelineation exercises.

=== 2015 Bersih 4 rally ===
Bersih 4 rallies were held on the streets of Kuala Lumpur, Kuching, and Kota Kinabalu in 2015 from 29 to 30 August, 2pm until midnight.

The gathering places for the rally should be located at Brickfields, Pasar Seni, Dataran Maybank, National Mosque, and Sogo shopping mall, according to the Bersih 2.0 chairperson. This was the first Bersih rally that had a strong racial imbalance, with Chinese predominantly at the rally.

=== 2016 Bersih 5 rally ===
The Bersih 5 rally was held peacefully on 19 November 2016 in Kuala Lumpur. A Bersih convoy was also launched and targeted all parts of Malaysia to raise awareness of the current democratic problems nationwide.

In January 2017, soon after Bersih 5, the movement’s former treasurer Masjaliza Hamzah was called in for question by the police over the funding behind the group’s activities.She told the media that she had declined to answer any questions posed by the police.

=== Transition during and after 2018 Malaysian General Election ===
Ahead of the 14th Malaysian General Election, Bersih worked with Suara Rakyat Malaysia (SUARAM), Pusat KOMAS, and other civil organisations through the "PEMANTAU" election-monitoring operations. It mobilised 100 coordinators and more than 500 volunteers to monitor matters including alleged vote-buying, misuse of government resources, electoral-roll and administration malpractices, racial campaigning and political violence.

Its former leader, Maria Chin Abdullah, left Bersih's leadership after confirming her entry in electoral politics, and was succeeded by Thomas Fann.

Following the first ever change in federal government since independence in the aftermath of this election, Bersih switched its focus on monitoring the progress of institutional reform and the conduct of the new government.

=== Post 2020 Sheraton Move ===
In the aftermath of the 2020 Sheraton Move political crisis, Bersih took a strong stand in opposing the formation of a federal government through the reconfiguration of parliamentary support without a general election and called for institutional safeguards against political defections. It called for reforms in party hopping laws, parliamentary independence, constituency fund allocations, political appointments and electoral administration.

The Malaysian parliament eventually passed the constitutional amendments dubbed the "Anti-Hopping Law" in 2022.

In 2022, the organisation officially reverted from "Bersih 2.0" back to its original name "Bersih" to avoid confusion.

=== Activities during 2022 Malaysian General Election ===
Bersih participated in the Election Commission's accredited "PEMERHATI" election observation programme in the run up towards the 15th Malaysian General Election. It mobilised 100 observers to monitor nomination, early voting and polling in 57 parliamentary constituencies, while separate teams monitored online campaigning and news coverage. It also operated a public reporting platform for alleged election offences, involving issues such as vote-buying, misuse of other public resources, and illegal campaigning practices.

=== 2023 leadership dispute ===
Incumbent chairperson Thomas Fann was initially reappointed for the 2023-2025 term. However, he announced his resignation soon after the steering committee election, citing divided views and a "no confidence" vote. Muhammad Faisal Abdul Aziz was elected the new chair on 15 December 2023, following a narrow win of 23 votes against Gopalan K. Papachan's 22.

=== 2024 Reformasi 100 Peratus rally ===
On 27 February 2024, Bersih led a march of an estimated 60-100 people from Tugu Negara to the parliament building under the banner "Reformasi 100 Peratus" (100 Per Cent Reform), and presented a memorandum calling for the implementation of electoral and institutional reforms. The demands included reforms involving parliament, the Election Commission, political financing and the separation of powers of the attorney general and public prosecutor.

== Leadership history ==
Period	Chairperson	Notes
2011–2013	Ambiga Sreenevasan and A. Samad Said	Served as co-chairpersons during the early Bersih 2.0 period.
2013–2018	Maria Chin Abdullah	Elected to succeed Ambiga in November 2013.
2018–2023	Thomas Fann	Elected in 2018 and re-elected in 2023 before resigning following an internal dispute over organisational direction.
2023–present	Muhammad Faisal Abdul Aziz	Elected in December 2023 and returned unopposed for the 2026–2028 term.

=== Current leadership ===
Position	Office holder
Chairperson	Muhammad Faisal Abdul Aziz
Deputy Chairperson	Lee See Kiang (Kelvin)
Vice-chairperson, Peninsular Malaysia	Azmil Mohamad Tayeb
Vice-chairperson, Sabah	Muhammad Fadhil Muhammad Kassim
Vice-chairperson, Sarawak	Ann Teo Chiang Joo
Treasurer	Alexzander Bernard Johnson
Committee member	Wong Siew Yun
Committee member	'Alyaah Hani Anuar
Committee member	Siti Hawa Abd Wahid

== Global Bersih ==
Global Bersih is a movement by Malaysian diaspora communities to lend support to Bersih and its cause. In conjunction with the Bersih 2.0 rally, Global Bersih organised rallies in 38 international locations with 4,003 overseas Malaysians in solidarity:

- New Zealand
  - Wellington, Auckland, Christchurch
- Australia
  - Sydney, Canberra, Melbourne, Hobart, Adelaide, Brisbane, Perth
- China
  - Suzhou, Shenzhen, Shanghai, Hong Kong
- Taiwan
  - Taipei
- Japan
  - Osaka
- South Korea
  - Seoul
- Singapore
- United Arab Emirates
  - Dubai
- Egypt
  - Cairo
- Turkey
  - Istanbul
- Sweden
  - Stockholm
- Austria
  - Graz
- Switzerland
  - Zurich, Geneva
- France
  - Paris
- England
  - London
- Scotland
  - Glasgow
- Northern Ireland
  - Belfast
- Ireland
  - Cork, Limerick, Dublin
- Canada
  - Ottawa
- USA
  - New York City, Washington DC, Chicago, San Francisco, Los Angeles, Denver, Portland

== Endorsees ==
As of 28 October 2014, the 61 non-governmental organisations that endorse Bersih include:

- Aliran Kesedaran Rakyat (Aliran) (The Peoples Flow of Awareness)
- Anwar Ibrahim Club (AIC)
- ABIM - Malaysian Islamic Youth Movement
- All Women's Action Society (AWAM)
- Council of Churches of Malaysia (CCM) Youth
- Centre for Independent Journalism (CIJ)
- Child Development Initiative
- Dewan Perhimpunan Cina KL-Selangor (Jawatankuasa Hak Sivil)
- Educational, Welfare and Research Foundation Malaysia
- Empower (Pusat Janadaya)
- Friends in Conversation (FIC)
- Federation of Indian Non-Governmental Organisations
- Good Governance Penang
- Group of Concerned Citizens (GCC)
- Indian Malaysian Active Generation (IMAGE)
- Independence People Action Committee (IPAC)
- Islamic Renaissance Front (IRF)
- Jaringan Rakyat Tertindas (JERIT) (Oppressed Citizens Network)
- Persatuan Kebangsaan Pelajar Islam Malaysia (PKPIM)
- Klang Consumer Association
- Kumpulan Aktivis Media Independent (KAMI)
- Labour Resource Centre (LRC)
- LLG Cultural Development Centre
- Majlis Kelab Bell Belia Tamil Malaysia
- Malaysian Association of Indian University Graduates
- Malaysian Dravidian Association
- Malaysian Hindu Youth Council
- Malaysian Indian Development & Unity Association
- Malaysian Indian Historical Association
- Malaysian Tamil Forum
- Malaysia Youth and Students Democratic Movement (DEMA)
- Micah Mandate, The
- Movement For Change, Sarawak (MoCS)
- Oriental Hearts and Minds Institute (OHMSI)
- Penang Independent Schools Education Society
- Permas
- Persahabatan Semparuthi
- Persatuan Alumni Han Chiang, Malaysia
- Persatuan Alumni Han Chiang, Pulau Pinang
- Persatuan Hak Asasi Manusia (HAKAM) (National Human Rights Society)
- Persatuan Pengguna & Sosial Daerah Petaling Jaya
- Pertubuhan IKRAM Malaysia (IKRAM)
- Pusat Komunikasi Masyarakat (KOMAS)
- Research for Social Advancement (REFSA)
- Rumah Anak Teater (RAT)
- Sahabat Wanita
- Saya Anak Bangsa Malaysia (SABM)
- Sembang-sembang Forum
- Sisters in Islam (SIS)
- Solidariti Mahasiswa Malaysia (SMM) (Students Solidarity Malaysia)
- Southeast Asian Centre for e-Media
- Students Reserve Unit (SERU)
- Suara Rakyat Malaysia (Suaram) (Voice of the People Malaysia)
- Tamil Foundation Malaysia
- Tenaganita
- University Malaya Association of New Youth (UMANY)
- Women's Aid Organisation (WAO)
- Women in Disability Association
- Women Institute for Research Development and Advancement (WIRDA)
- Writers' Alliance for Media Independence (WAMI)
- Youth for Change (Y4C)

== Original member organisations ==
On 23 November 2006, Bersih issued its first joint communiqué with the endorsement from 26 non-governmental organisations and 5 political parties:

Non-government organisations:

- Aliran Kesedaran Rakyat (Aliran) (The Peoples Flow of Awareness)
- All Women's Action Society (AWAM)
- Centre of Independent Journalism (CIJ)
- Citizens' Health Initiative (CHI)
- Civil Rights Committee, KLSCAH (CRC)
- Community Action Network (CAN)
- EMPOWER (Pusat Janadaya)
- ERA Consumer Malaysia (ERACON)
- Gabungan Mahasiswa Islam Se-Malaysia (GAMIS) (Coalition of Muslim Students Malaysia)
- Group of Concerned Citizens (GCC)
- Jaringan Rakyat Tertindas (JERIT) (Oppressed Citizens Network)
- Labour Resource Centre (LRC)
- Malaysian Trade Union Congress (MTUC)
- Malaysian Voters Union (MALVU)
- Malaysia Youth and Students Democratic Movement (DEMA)
- Persatuan Hak Asasi Manusia (HAKAM) (National Human Rights Society)
- Persatuan Ulama' Malaysia (PUM)
- Pusat Komunikasi Masyarakat (KOMAS)
- Research for Social Advancement (REFSA)
- Save Ourselves Penang (SOS Penang)
- Solidariti Mahasiswa Malaysia (SMM) (Students Solidarity Malaysia)
- Suara Rakyat Malaysia (Suaram) (Voice of the People Malaysia)
- Tamil Foundation Malaysia
- Unit Pemikiran Politik (UPP) (Political Thinktank Unit)
- Women's Development Collective (WDC)
- Writers' Alliance for Media Independence (WAMI)

Political parties:

- Democratic Action Party (DAP)
- Parti Islam Se-Malaysia (PAS)
- Parti Keadilan Rakyat (PKR)
- Parti Sosialis Malaysia (PSM)
- Sarawak National Party (SNAP)
