= Suara Rakyat Malaysia =

Malaysian human-rights organisation

Suara Rakyat Malaysia Voice of the Malaysian People SUARAM
- Founded: 5 August 1989
- Type: (registered as company) Non-profit; NGO
- Location(s): Headquarters: B-G-15, 8 Avenue Business Centre, Jalan Sungai Jernih 8/1, 46050 Petaling Jaya; Penang branch: 91C-02-21, University Heights, Jalan Sungai Dua, 11700 Penang
- Services: Advocacy and practice of Human Rights
- Fields: Human Rights, Environment Rights, Activism
- Key people: Kua Kia Soong (Director), Sevan Doraisamy (Executive Director)
- Website: www.suaram.net

Suara Rakyat Malaysia, better known by its abbreviation SUARAM (Malay for "Voice of the Malaysian People"), is a human rights organisation in Malaysia created in 1989 after Operation Lalang, when 106 opposition, unions, activist leaders were detained without trial under the Internal Security Act. In 1989, the detainee support group, ISA detainees and other activist groups decided to form SUARAM, whose primary object was to campaign for the abolition of the ISA and detention without trial. SUARAM later evolved into other areas of human rights and environmental rights.

Suaram is considered one of the leading human rights organisations in Malaysia. Other general human rights organisations in Malaysia include the Penang-based Aliran Kesedaran Negara (ALIRAN), HAKAM (National Human Rights Society) and many others. Suaram has often worked with these organisations on a minimal platform of co-operation on issues such as the abolishment of the Internal Security Act (ISA) and electoral reform. The secretariat in KL also publishes an annual report on the status of civil and political rights in Malaysia since 1998.

Suaram is a founding member of the Asian Forum for Human Rights and Development (FORUM-ASIA).

According to SUARAM's website, "SUARAM is an independent and a human rights organisation which is not linked to any other agencies. We will always be on the side of victims of human rights violations, the poor and the oppressed, without fear or favour. Its mandate is enshrined in the Malaysian Human Rights Charter and the Universal Declaration of Human Rights. Thus SUARAM's main objective is the protection and realisation of human rights in Malaysia regardless of the government-of-the-day."(http://www.suaram.net/?page_id=4377)

SUARAM is funded by donations and grants from public and private sources. However, the most important source comes from private donations, local fund-raising events, sales of books and campaign merchandise. Funds are accepted strictly on the basis of non-interference of donors.

== History ==
=== 1989: The Founding Year ===
Suaram was founded on 5 August 1989 by several Operation Lalang detainees, lawyers, as well as family members of these ISA detainees. The aims and objectives were set forth in the founding statement, where the protection and promotion of human rights and the development of public awareness being the areas that needed to be addressed in Malaysia.

The newly fledged organisation also organised a fund raising dinner on 9 September at the Selangor Chinese Assembly Hall and sold its first publication: "The Why? Papers", which was a critique of the Malaysian Government's "White Paper on the October 1987 affair". SUARAM also began to compile a database of ISA cases since the 1960s and worked on "Knowing your Rights" leaflets.

=== The 1990s: Building Coalitions ===
SUARAM officially moved into a permanent location in Petaling Jaya by April 1990 and formed a secretariat to plan and execute policies and plans of action. Subcommittees were soon formed to produce leaflets about SUARAM. During that same year, SUARAM joined forces with other NGOs including Aliran and Selangor Graduate Society in signing a joint statement calling for the release of all ISA detainees.

By 1991, SUARAM had also moved into the developmental state of a "Malaysia Charter of Human Rights", once again working with other human rights organisations in Malaysia. A Handbook for Families of ISA Detainees was also launched in October 1991, and soon after, SUARAM was invited to become a founding member of the Asian Forum for Human Rights and Development (FORUM ASIA) in December 1991.

In 1993, SUARAM and other Human Rights organisations finally saw the Malaysian Charter of Human Rights come into being. The following year saw SUARAM forming a Support Committee for Indigenous Peoples especially to highlight the plight of affected communities in the Bakun Area in Sarawak. A Human Rights education and training committee was also formed to help in the training of trainers for Human Rights and Development.

1995 saw the launch of the "Stop Bakun Dam Campaign" coalition where SUARAM and 40 other Malaysian NGOs came together to mobilise public support against the Bakun Dam project, and to support the indigenous communities affected by the dam project. Many aspects of the project, including the lack of consultation and secrecy, were raised by these NGOs. Fact-finding missions were also organised by the Coalition and a report was issues in 1999. Due to the fact finding missions and campaigns against the Bakun Dam project, many key SUARAM members including director Kua Kia Soong and former executive director Cynthia Gabriel have since been barred by the Sarawak State Government from entering Sarawak.

SUARAM also took part in the East Timor Conference in 1996, where Human Rights organisations in Malaysia once again came together to discuss the political situation in East Timor. However, the conference was disrupted by members of Youth Wings from the ruling Barisan Nasional coalition, and activists and protesters from both sides were eventually arrested during the incident.

In 1998, SUARAM and other Malaysian NGOs organised the Asia-Pacific People's Assembly (APPA) with the theme "Confronting Globalisation: Reasserting People's Rights" in response to the APEC leaders meeting being held at the same time in Malaysia. APPA helped SUARAM and other NGOs in the region to build coalitions, educate activists and furthered the discussion of the effects of globalisation in the Asia-Pacific. Malaysia's human rights record was highlighted by SUARAM during this Assembly. That year also saw the launch of SUARAM's annual Human Rights Report, which continues to be published to this day.

To cap the successful end of the decade for SUARAM, the secretariat finally launched its first autonomous branch outside of Kuala Lumpur, with SUARAM Johor Bahru being launched at a forum on 10 April 1999. The branch in Johor Bahru has its own monitoring and documentation unit, a media unit, an issue response unit and a campaigning unit. A coordinator was also appointed and funded by headquarters in KL, and also developed its own secretariat.

=== 2000s: Expansion ===
The beginning of 2000 saw the Selangor State Government announcing a plan to build a dam across the Sungai Selangor at Kuala Kubu Baru. Two major public gatherings were soon organised by SUARAM and other NGOs, and these organisations later formed the SOS Selangor coalition against the dam. During that same year, SUARAM also organised a nation conference on "People before Profits: Asserting the Rights of Communities in Malaysian Development" on 4–5 November 2000. This conference saw the gathering of communities across Malaysia who have been victims of unsustainable development.

2002 saw SUARAM branching up north to the state of Penang after a positively received training workshop for students. The organisation followed the same organisational structure used in Johor Bahru, quickly finding itself being involved in a coalition against the Penang Outer Right Road project. The Penang Branch was officially launched on 10 December 2002. Since 2002, SUARAM Penang has been actively working with NGOs on local issues, has published its own newsletter and organised many forums and conferences.

By 2006, SUARAM saw itself expanding into the areas of refugee rights and local democracy. Special desks were set up at SUARAM HQ, where full-time coordinators were appointed for these areas of human rights work. A "Green Desk" was also set up but currently lacks a full-time coordinator to handle environmental issues. Nevertheless, SUARAM has continued to be involved with environmental issues and has attended international environmental conferences and conferences in support of environmental rights.

== Controversies ==
=== Suaram Is Not Registered/Illegal Association ===
The Registrar of Societies is investigating Suaram for raising funds while operating as an unregistered society. ROS director Datuk Abdul Rahman Othman said the Companies Commission of Malaysia (CCM), however, was investigating Suara Inisiatif Sdn Bhd the company linked to Suaram. "The group has held events like forums and fund raisers under the banner of 'Suaram' rather than Suara Inisiatif," explained Abdul Rahman.

Suaram, helmed by Dr Kua Kia Soong, had carried out their events under the banner of Suara Inisiatif, the Societies Act would not have been breached. Meanwhile, the Attorney-General Chambers has ordered CCM to further investigate the accounts and other related offences allegedly committed by Suaram and Suara Initiatif Sdn Bhd under the Companies Act 1965.

Meanwhile, a Bank Negara official confirmed that its probe on the accounts and "money trail" of Suaram and the company was still ongoing. The official said they were still looking "for (the) source of the fund and its money trail and other suspected transactions", adding that Bank Negara was also working with other agencies to avoid possible overlapping of investigations before forwarding their own investigation papers to the Attorney-General Chambers.

Domestic Trade, Cooperative and Consumerism Minister Datuk Seri Ismail Sabri Yaakob disclosed that CCM's thorough investigation had allegedly detected serious violations of at least five sections of the Companies Act by Suaram and the company. The minister called for another investigation into whether a US NGO's alleged funding of Suaram was linked to maverick currency speculator George Soros.

Ismail Sabri asked Bank Negara to investigate the matter under the Anti-Money Laundering and Anti-Terrorism Financing Act 2001. He also asked the Home Ministry and Registrar of Societies to determine Suaram's status.

But SUARAM in their responds clearly stated that SUARAM is (Suara Inisiatif Sdn Bhd) and it is guided by the Memorandum and Articles of Association pursuant to the Companies Act, 1965. SUARAM believe in the universality, interdependence and indivisibility of all rights: civil, political, economic, social and cultural.(http://www.suaram.net/?page_id=4377). As SUARAM (Suara Inisiatif Sdn Bhd) is registered under the Companies Act of Malaysia, our operations and activities complies with our registration under the law.

== Campaigns ==
Some of the key campaigns that are synonymous with SUARAM are

- Campaign against the Internal Security Act and detention without trial (Right to Trial)
- Right to Justice
- Police reforms and
- Freedom of Expression, Assembly and Association.

== Organisational structure ==
SUARAM's present executive director is Sevan Doraisamy, replacing Yap Swee Seng in 2015.

Other Key activists that are and/or have been associated with SUARAM include:-

- Dr. Kua Kia Soong (former Member of Parliament)
- Fan Yew Teng (former Member of Parliament)
- Sivarasa Rasiah, Member of Parliament for Subang, Petaling
- Julian Jayaseelan - the 1st Coordinator
- Charles Hector - the 2nd Coordinator
- Lee Siew Hwa - the 3rd Coordinator
- Irene Fernandez (now of Tenaganita and Caram Asia)
- Bruno Gentil Pereira
- Dr Syed Husin Ali (ex-Senator, former Deputy President of Parti Keadilan Rakyat)
- Tian Chua, Member of Parliament for Batu, Kuala Lumpur
- S. Arutchelvan (now Secretary-General of Parti Sosialis Malaysia and Local Councillor, MPKJ)
- Elizabeth Wong - a former Coordinator, now State assemblyman in Selangor
- Cynthia Gabriel - a former Coordinator, now with Caram Asia, and Local Councillor, MBPJ
- Premesh Chandran (of Malaysiakini)
- Irene Xavier - (Sahabat Wanita)
- Dr. Mohd Nasir Hashim -(now President of Parti Sosialis Malaysia and former State assemblyman in Selangor)
- Toni Kasim - a former volunteer and activist
