= Maria Chin Abdullah =

Malaysian politician

- مارية چين بنت عبدالله 陈清莲
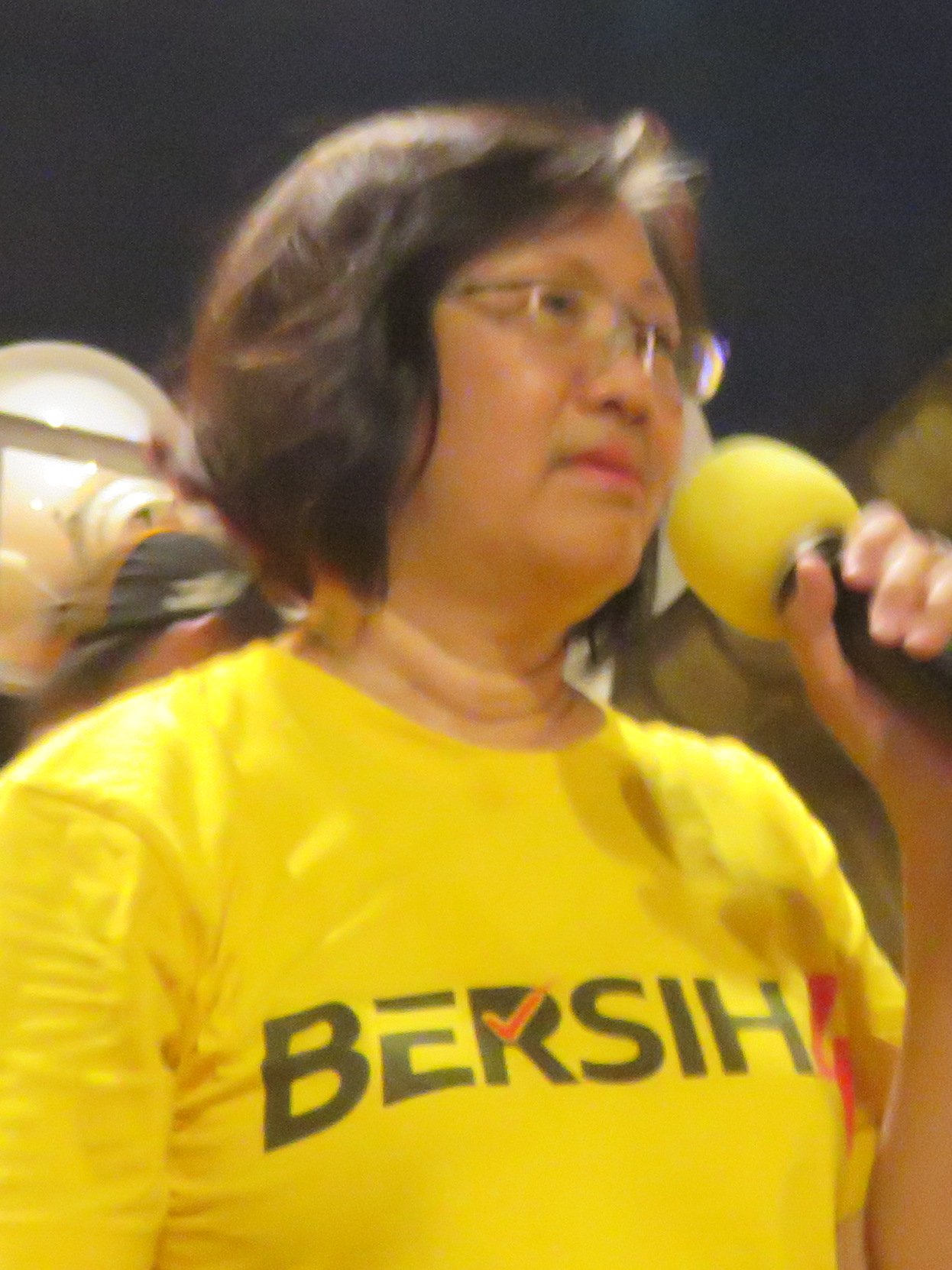
- Maria speaking at the Bersih 4 rally in 2015.

Member of the Malaysian Parliament for Petaling Jaya
- In office 9 May 2018 – 19 November 2022
- Preceded by: Hee Loy Sian (PR–PKR)
- Succeeded by: Lee Chean Chung (PH–PKR)
- Majority: 57,137 (2018)

Chairperson of Bersih 2.0
- In office 2013–2018
- Preceded by: Ambiga Sreenevasan
- Succeeded by: Thomas Fann

Personal details
- Born: Mary Chin Cheen Lian; 1956 (age 69–70) United Kingdom
- Citizenship: Malaysian
- Party: People's Justice Party (PKR)
- Other political affiliations: Pakatan Harapan (PH)
- Spouse: Yunus Ali (1992–2010)
- Children: 3 sons; Azumin Mohamad Yunus, Aziman Maria and Azemi Maria.
- Occupation: Politician, Social Activist

Maria Chin binti Abdullah (Jawi: مارية چين بنت عبدالله; born 1956 in United Kingdom) also known as Mary Chin Cheen Lian (simplified Chinese: 陈清莲; traditional Chinese: 陳清蓮; pinyin: Chén Qīnglián; Jyutping: Can4 Cing1 Lin4; Pe̍h-ōe-jī: Tân Chheng-liân) is a Malaysian politician and social activist who served as the Member of Parliament (MP) for Petaling Jaya from May 2018 to November 2022. She is a member of the People's Justice Party (PKR), a component party of the Pakatan Harapan (PH) ruling coalition. She also held the Bersih rally and formed the Coalition for Clean and Fair Elections 2.0 (Bersih 2.0) and All Women's Action Society (AWAM) non-governmental organisations (NGOs). She served as the Chairperson of Bersih 2.0 from 2013 to 2018, the Chairperson of AWAM and the executive director of the Persatuan Kesedaran Komuniti Selangor (Empower). As a social activist, she champions both the women and human rights.

== Family ==
Maria met Mohamad Yunus bin Lebai Ali, a Malaysian student activist of the 1970s. Yunus Ali was in exile and was a former Palestine Liberation Organisation (PLO) freedom fighter. In 1987 Yunus Ali was detained as a result of Operation Lalang, where the Internal Security Act was used against 106 other social activists and politicians. They were married in 1992, three years after Yunus was released in 1989. Maria converted to Islam then. Yunus died in 2010 from lupus. The couple has three sons, namely, Azumin Mohamad Yunus, Aziman Maria and Azemi Maria.

== Detention ==
On 18 November 2016, the Royal Malaysian Police arrested Maria under the Security Offences, Special Measures Act (SOSMA), which allows the Malaysian police to detain a person for 28 days before filing any charge. She was released on 28 November 2016 after 11 days in detention.

The US government has criticised her detention in a permanently-lit isolation confinement cell, saying that the US government is "troubled by the ongoing detention and solitary confinement of Maria Chin Abdullah under national security laws". She was detained the day before massive public protests against the Malaysian federal government head of Najib Razak for widespread corruption allegation involving a US$4 billion state fund scandal.

== Political involvement ==
In March 2018, she announced her decision to leave her post in Bersih 2.0 and contest as an independent parliamentary candidate under the Pakatan Harapan (PH) banner. Later that month, she announced that she would contest under the PKR party banner, with then-party-vice-president Nurul Izzah Anwar welcoming her as "part of the PKR family". In the subsequent 2018 general election, she won the Petaling Jaya constituency with 78,984 votes against Barisan Nasional's Chew Hian Tat (21,847) and Gagasan Sejahtera's Noraini Hussin (14,448).

== Election results ==
Parliament of Malaysia
Year	Constituency	Candidate	Votes	Pct	Opponent(s)	Votes	Pct	Ballots cast	Majority	Turnout
2018	P105 Petaling Jaya	Maria Chin Abdullah (PKR)	78,984	68.52%	Chew Hian Tat (MCA)	21,847	18.95%	116,597	57,137	82.74%
2018	P105 Petaling Jaya	Maria Chin Abdullah (PKR)	78,984	68.52%	Noraini Hussin (PAS)	14,448	12.53%	116,597	57,137	82.74%

Parliament of Malaysia
Preceded by Hee Loy Sian	Member of Parliament for Petaling Jaya; 10 May 2018–19 November 2022
