= Malaysia Youth and Students Democratic Movement =

Malaysia Youth & Student Democratic Movement
- Gerakan Demokratik Belia & Mahasiswa Malaysia 马来西亚青年与学生民主运动
- Abbreviation: DEMA
- Formation: 1998
- Purpose: Youth and student movement in Malaysia.
- Website: Wordpress website Official website
- Remarks: Malaysia Youth and Students Democratic Movement on Facebook

Malaysia Youth & Student Democratic Movement (Malay: Gerakan Demokratik Belia & Mahasiswa Malaysia; Chinese: 马来西亚青年与学生民主运动; abbrev: DEMA) formed on 17 September 1998. The movement consists of a group of students from various universities who were responsible for presenting the effects of globalization on the youth and student movement in Malaysia. The presentation was in November 1998 where two conferences - Asia Pacific Economic Cooperation (APEC) and the Asia Pacific People’s Assembly (APPA) were organized around that issue of economic policy in the framework of globalization and human rights.

== Structure ==
DEMA has a network involving several state campuses in Malaysia. DEMA has a national body with bases known as Students Progressive Front in several state universities across Malaysia. The Students Progressive Fronts are largely autonomous, with internal meetings, activities and annual general meetings (AGM) where posts are elected. Within each Students Progressive Front, there is an external coordinator who also functions as the Campus Coordinator of DEMA. The Campus Coordinator ensures that information, issues, activities and members flow between the Students Progressive Front at the campus level and DEMA. DEMA coordinates different campus-based issues and activities at the national level. The structure of DEMA encourages bottom-up participation.

== Legacy ==
DEMA continues to have an influence on the political culture of youth movements in Malaysia. In 2007 some members of DEMA released a short film.
