= Human rights in Malaysia =

The protection of basic human rights is enshrined in the Constitution of Malaysia. These include liberty of the person (Article 5) and prohibition of slavery and forced labour (Article 6). At the national level, legislative measures that exist to prevent human rights violations and abuses can be found in acts and laws on issues that either have a human rights component or relate to certain groups of society whose rights may be at risk of being violated. Human rights groups are generally critical of the Malaysian government and the Royal Malaysia Police.

Preventive detention laws such as the Internal Security Act 1960 and the Emergency (Public Order and Prevention of Crime) Ordinance 1969 allow for detention without trial or charge and as such are a source of concern for human rights organizations like Suara Rakyat Malaysia. However, the Internal Security Act 1960 has been repealed and replaced by SOSMA in 2012 and the 1969 Emergency Ordinance has lapsed following the annulment of three Emergency Proclamations in 2011.

== Legislation ==
Several Malaysian laws are said to restrict basic human rights. Recent sweeping changes in these laws have been described by the government as human rights reforms but, according to critics, have actually, in some regards, made restrictions even more stringent.

The Ministry of Foreign Affairs has defended the country's strict controls on human rights with the explanation that the nation "takes a holistic approach to human rights in that it views all rights as indivisible and interdependent. In Malaysia, the rights of every citizen are protected by legal provisions in the Federal Constitution... But these rights are not absolute and are subject to, among others, public order, morality and security of the country." Hence, while claiming to "uphold... the universal principles of human rights," Malaysia finds it important to "take into account the history of the country as well as the religious, social and cultural diversities of its communities. This is to ensure that the respect for social harmony is preserved and protected. The practices of human rights in Malaysia are reflections of a wider Asian value system where welfare and collective well-being of the community are more significant compared to individual rights."

=== Traditional restrictive legislation ===
There are several strong and sweeping pieces of legislation that have long been used by Malaysia to restrict the human rights of individuals and thus preserve, in its view, social order. In 2008, Amnesty International summed up the state of human rights in Malaysia, in part, by noting that the government had "tightened control of dissent and curtailed the right to freedom of expression and religion," arresting bloggers under the Sedition Act, using the Printing Presses and Publications Act (PPPA) to control the content of newspapers, and arbitrarily arresting several individuals under the Internal Security Act (ISA). In 2012 there were major changes in a number of these laws that were officially described as human rights reforms but that have been widely criticised either for not going far enough or for, in fact, further restricting human rights.

=== Internal Security Act 1960 (Repealed) ===
Perhaps the best known of these laws is the Internal Security Act, which was passed in 1960, three years after Malaysia gained its independence from Britain. Widely viewed as draconian, it permits long-term detention without trial, and over the decades has been used systematically against individuals who have been viewed, for various reasons, as threats to Malaysia's government or to the "social order."

In 2012, the Internal Security Act 1960 was officially repealed by the Parliament of Malaysia and replaced by the Security Offences (Special Measures) Act 2012.

=== Sedition Act 1948 ===
Another powerful and widely employed piece of legislation, which dates back to 1948, when Malaysia was still a British colony, is the Sedition Act, which criminalizes speech or writing that is considered to be seditious. Many critics and political opponents of the Malaysian government have been arrested and held under the Sedition Act, the effect of which has been to restrict freedom of expression in Malaysia.

=== Printing Presses and Publications Act 1984 ===
Passed in 1984, the Printing Presses and Publications Act, which makes it a crime to publish anything without a government licence that must be renewed every year by the Home Affairs Ministry, has been used to silence government critics and to ban various publications for a variety of reasons. As with the Sedition Act, the practical effect of the Printing Presses and Publications Act has been to severely restrict freedom of speech in Malaysia. Meanwhile, in East Malaysia (Sabah and Sarawak), the press is more free as there is less concern of controversy happening there.

=== Police Act 1967 ===
The Police Act of 1967 allows the Royal Malaysia Police to detain persons without warrants, and has been used especially to restrict the freedom of assembly. Before 2012 and the introduction of Peaceful Assembly Act 2012, under Section 27 of the Police Act, police permits were required for gatherings of over four people, other than strikes.

=== Changes in restrictive laws ===
On 15 September 2011, Prime Minister Najib Razak announced that the Internal Security Act 1960 would be totally repealed and "be replaced by a new law that incorporates far more judicial oversight and limits the powers of the police to detain suspects for preventive reasons". The government also committed itself to the repeal of some of its other best known legal instruments for restricting human rights, including the Sedition Act 1948, three Emergency Proclamations and Banishment Act 1959. In addition, the government agreed to review several laws, including Section 27 of the Police Act, the Printing Presses and Publications Act and the Official Secrets Act.

Between 2011 and 2012, numerous legislative changes have taken place. The Internal Security Act 1960 was officially repealed and replaced by SOSMA on 31 July 2012. Three Emergency Proclamations issued in 1966, 1969, and 1977 were also annulled by the Parliament on 20 September 2011. The Restricted Residence Act 1933 and the Banishment Act 1959, which has not been used for 34 years before 2011, was formally abolished by the Parliament of Malaysia in December 2011. Section 27 of the Police Act 1967, which required a police permit to organise any public assembly was abolished in 2012 and the Peaceful Assembly Act 2012 was also enacted in the same year.

=== Security Offences (Special Measures) Act 2012 ===
In a June 2012 article published in the East–West Center's Asia Pacific Bulletin and reprinted in the Bangkok Post and on Human Rights Watch's website, writer Mickey Spiegel noted that in April 2012, the Malaysian parliament had passed the replacement for the Internal Security Act (ISA), called the Security Offences (Special Measures) Act 2012 (SOSMA). Spiegel complained that SOSMA "does not go far enough to protect the fundamental rights and freedoms of Malaysians." In fact, asserted Spiegel, SOSMA is "actually more repressive and retrograde" than the ISA in some ways, an indication that the government was "playing 'bait-and-switch' with human rights."

For example, "coupled with amendments to other laws," SOSMA "tightened restrictions or banned outright activities already under constraint, added limits to previously unrestricted activities, and broadened police apprehension and surveillance powers in new and innovative ways." In addition, it "further erodes citizens' individual protections, for example by ceding to the police rather than judges the power to intercept communications."

=== Peaceful Assembly Act 2012 ===
The Peaceful Assembly Act replaced Section 27 of the Police Act, which required police permits for large gatherings. Under the Peaceful Assembly Act, such permits are not necessary. Instead, organisers must give the police five days' notice (previously ten days' notice before 2019) of any planned gathering, after which the police will reply, outlining any restrictions they wish to place on the gathering. This Act prohibits persons under 15 from taking part in gatherings, prohibits persons under 21 from organising them, and bars them from taking place near schools, mosques, airports, railway stations, and other designated places. Though touted as a reform of Section 27 of the Police Act, the Peaceful Assembly Act has been severely criticised by the political opposition and others as more restrictive than the legislation it replaced, with one opposition leader saying that the it gives "absolute powers to the police."

In 2019, this Act was amended by the Pakatan Harapan government formed after the 2018 General Election, which saw the notice period for organisers planning peaceful protests shortened from ten days to five days, and the ban on street protest was also abolished. Offences under Section 9 and 15 of this Act were also converted to compoundable offences with a RM5000 fine, which is not classified as a crime and parliamentarians found to have violated these sections would not lose their seats or eligibility to contest in election.

=== ASEAN human-rights declaration ===
In November 2012, Prime Minister Najib Razak signed the first human rights declaration by the ASEAN nations, an action that officially committed Malaysia "to its first foreign convention to promote fair treatment of every individual irrespective of race, religion and political opinion." This signing, it was noted, took place at a time when Malaysia had "come under close international scrutiny for its alleged mishandling of several recent human rights issues," including crackdowns on two major pro-democracy protests in July 2011 and April 2012. The Human Rights Commission of Malaysia expressed its disappointment that the declaration permits "restrictions to be made on grounds wider than what are accepted internationally," and pointed especially to General Principle 7, "which declares on the one hand, that all human rights are universal, indivisible, interdependent and interrelated, recognises on the other, that Member States may take into consideration their political, economic, legal, socio-cultural, and historical backgrounds in the realisation of human rights in their countries."

=== Employment Act (Minimum Wage) ===
As on 1 May 2022, minimum monthly payable wage binding by the Minimum Wages Order 2022 was RM 1,500 for firms that have more than five employees, whereas minimum hourly wage amounts to RM7.21 per hour.

== Human Rights Commission of Malaysia ==
The Human Rights Commission of Malaysia, better known in the country as Suhakam (which is short for Suruhanjaya Hak Asasi Malaysia), is the country's major agency for addressing human-rights issues.

== Basic rights ==
The Constitution of Malaysia forbids discrimination against citizens based on sex, religion, and race, but also accords a "special position" in Article 153 of the Constitution, to Bumiputera, the indigenous peoples of Malaysia including ethnic Malays and members of tribes indigenous to the states of Sabah and Sarawak in eastern Malaysia. Those who are not members of the ethnic Malay majority are treated according to article 153 of the Malaysian Federal Constitution where special privileges to ethnic Malays and the natives of Sabah and Sarawak are to be provided in education, employment, and other spheres.

=== Freedom of speech ===
Freedom of speech in Malaysia has been widely disputed upon as many rallies and protests, including Bersih, have been seen to have their members arrested without warrant.

On 8 July 2020, Human Rights Watch reported that Malaysian authorities have initiated criminal investigations against people criticising the government. Journalists, civil society activists, and ordinary people have faced police questioning for peaceful speech.

On July 30, 2020, Human Rights Watch appealed to the Malaysian authorities for the release of Mohamed Rayhan Kabir, a Bangladeshi migrant worker, who was arrested for his criticism of government policies towards migrants. He was featured in an Al Jazeera documentary that aired on July 3 about the treatment of migrant workers during the COVID-19 pandemic in Malaysia.

=== Freedom of assembly and movement ===
Although citizens technically enjoy the right to assembly, public gatherings are subject to police approval. The Societies Act requires organisations of seven or more people to register, with the government denying registration to certain groups, including human rights organisations, and the Universities and University Colleges Act restricts the formation of student groups. While Malaysians generally enjoy freedom to travel within the country and abroad, and to move abroad and move back to Malaysia, residents of peninsula Malaysia require passports or national IDs to enter the states of Sabah and Sarawak, and citizens cannot travel to Israel without official permission.

=== Freedom of religion ===
The constitution guarantees freedom of religion, but also states that Islam is the official religion. Among the official public holidays in Malaysia (varying by area) are Muslim, Buddhist, Hindu, and Christian holy days. Marriages between Muslims and non-Muslims are not recognised and ethnic Malays are considered Muslim by law. Non-Sunni interpretations of Islam are illegal. Islamic courts enforce sharia law in certain areas of responsibility. In practice, citizens who are not Sunnis face religious discrimination. Apostasy by Muslims is, depending on the state, punishable by imprisonment, detention, whipping or fines. Two states have the death penalty on apostasy, but federal law prevents the implementation of the death penalty for apostasy.

In 2024, the country was scored 1 out of 4 for freedom of religion according to Freedom House.

=== Political freedoms ===
Though Malaysia has a multi-party parliamentary system of government with a constitutional monarchy, the United Malays National Organisation (UMNO) had held power since 1957 and opposition parties do not compete on a level playing ground. However, UMNO was voted out of office in 2018, ending its 61-year reign as Malaysia's ruling party. Over the years, the Prime Minister's powers have increased and Parliament's have declined. The only elected officials are members of state assemblies and of the federal parliament. Since 1969, municipal and other officials have been appointed.

However, there are signs of improvement in recent years, especially after the fall of Barisan Nasional government in 2018.

Malaysia's ranking in the Press Freedom Index has been gradually increasing since 2017, with 144th place in 2017; 145th place in 2018; 123rd place in 2019; 101st place in 2020; 119th place in 2021; 113th place in 2022; 73rd place in 2023; and 107th place in 2024. The year 2023 saw the highest leap in Malaysia's ranking by 40 places to 73rd compared to the previous year, making it the only country in Southeast Asia at the time (besides East Timor) without a 'Difficult situation' or 'Very Serious situation' with regards to press freedom. However, the following year 2024 saw Malaysia's ranking dropped by 34 places to 107th place, making it only the second-highest ranking country among ASEAN countries behind Thailand (87th).

In terms of Democracy Index, Malaysia has scored 7.29 in 2023, thereby placing it at 40th (the highest ranking of a Muslim-majority country) in the global ranking, and is classified as a 'Flawed democracy'. The score also makes Malaysia the highest ranking country in Southeast Asia, and 6th in the Asia and Australasia region after New Zealand, Taiwan, Australia, Japan and South Korea. Malaysia's score has seen gradual rising over the years, started out with 5.98 in 2006 as "Hybrid regime" to 7.29 in 2023 as "Flawed democracy", with notable increase in 2018 (6.88), 2019 (7.16), 2020 (7.19), 2021 (7.24), and 2022 (7.30).

== Children's rights ==
Malaysians inherit citizenship from their parents. Persons who cannot prove that their parents were married, or whose parents were of different religions, are denied citizenship and considered stateless. Children who lack birth certificates cannot attend public or private schools. Primary education is compulsory, but this requirement is not enforced. Incest and other forms of sexual exploitation of children are problems in rural areas. Statutory rape is illegal, for which the age of consent is 16 years old under the Penal Code. Child prostitutes are often treated not as victims but as delinquents. Many children of illegal immigrants live on the street and work menial jobs, commit crimes, or engage in prostitution. Malaysia is not a party to the 1980 Hague Convention on the Civil Aspects of International Child Abduction, but after the United Nations Human Rights Council's Universal Periodic Review of Malaysia in 2009, the government withdrew several but not all of its reservations under the Convention on the Rights of the Child (CRC) and acceded to the two optional protocols to the CRC.

== Women's rights ==
Malaysia ratified the Convention on the Elimination of All Forms of Discrimination Against Women (CEDAW) in August 1995 with reservations. Certain reservations were removed in 2010 but some were maintained, namely Articles 9(2), 16(1)(a), 16(1)(c), 16(1)(f) and 16(1)(g) as these Articles were said to be in conflict with the Malaysian Federal Constitution and sharia law.

=== Weakness in rape laws ===
There are crisis centres at many government hospitals where victims can report acts of rape and domestic abuse, but owing to cultural attitudes and other factors about 90 percent of rape victims remain silent. Domestic abuse cases are often complicated, moreover, by provisions of sharia law that forbid wives to disobey their husbands, including in bed. Medical treatment for women is adequate, including pre- and postpartum care.

The punishment for rape in Malaysia is a prison term of up to 30 years, plus whipping and a fine; the law against rape is enforced effectively. Despite effective rape enforcement, however, there is also a complicated issue concerning the way the law limits, much to the detriment of rape victims, what actually constitutes as rape. Under Section 375 of the Penal Code, rape only happens when a man's penis enters a woman's vagina without consent, or when the women being penetrated is under the age of 16.

Before 2017, the penetration of a women's vagina, by body parts other than the penis, may not be considered as rape. Such as a 2011 case in Sarawak, which a 60 years old man named Bunya Jalong, who had impregnated a 15 years old girl was acquitted of rape charges by the Court of Appeal only because he used his finger, prompting public outcry and uproar from several NGOs. In 2017, the Penal Code was amended in Section 377CA to cover this legal loophole by expanding the definition of "sexual connection by objects" to include any body parts other than the penis, which makes it punishable with 5 to 30 years of imprisonment and whipping.

Section 375 under the Penal Code also allows men to perform intercourse against their spouses without permission. Marital rape is not officially recognised as a crime in Malaysia, but since 2007, Section 375A has been added to the Penal Code to outlawed husbands from deliberately hurting their wives for sex. Despite that, it can still be a problem for victims who have not sustained injury and no one has ever been charged under Section 375A as of June 2015.

Adding to the issue of marital rape is also the fact that courts sometimes allow the release of rapists who decide to marry their own victims. One case in 2016 involved a 28 years old man in Sarawak who sexually abused an underaged girl 14 years of age, but was discharged by the Sessions court as the victim has withdraw her complaint against the accused on the ground that the man have married her. However, the High Court has reinstated the case and ordered for a retrial set for 2017 following the appeal by the prosecutors. Another 2013 case which involved a 40 years old man in Sabah also saw the rapist tried to escape his conviction by marrying the 13 years old victim mid-trial under shariah law, but his attempt was unsuccessful and was sentenced to 12 years jail and 2 strokes of the cane in his final appeal in 2015.

=== Sharia courts ===
Women are discriminated against in sharia courts, especially in family-law matters. Sharia allows men to have multiple wives and favours males in inheritance cases. Non-Muslim women, and Muslim women in four states, enjoy equal parental rights. There is employment discrimination against women. In Kedah, women performers can appear only before female audiences.

=== Sexual harassment ===
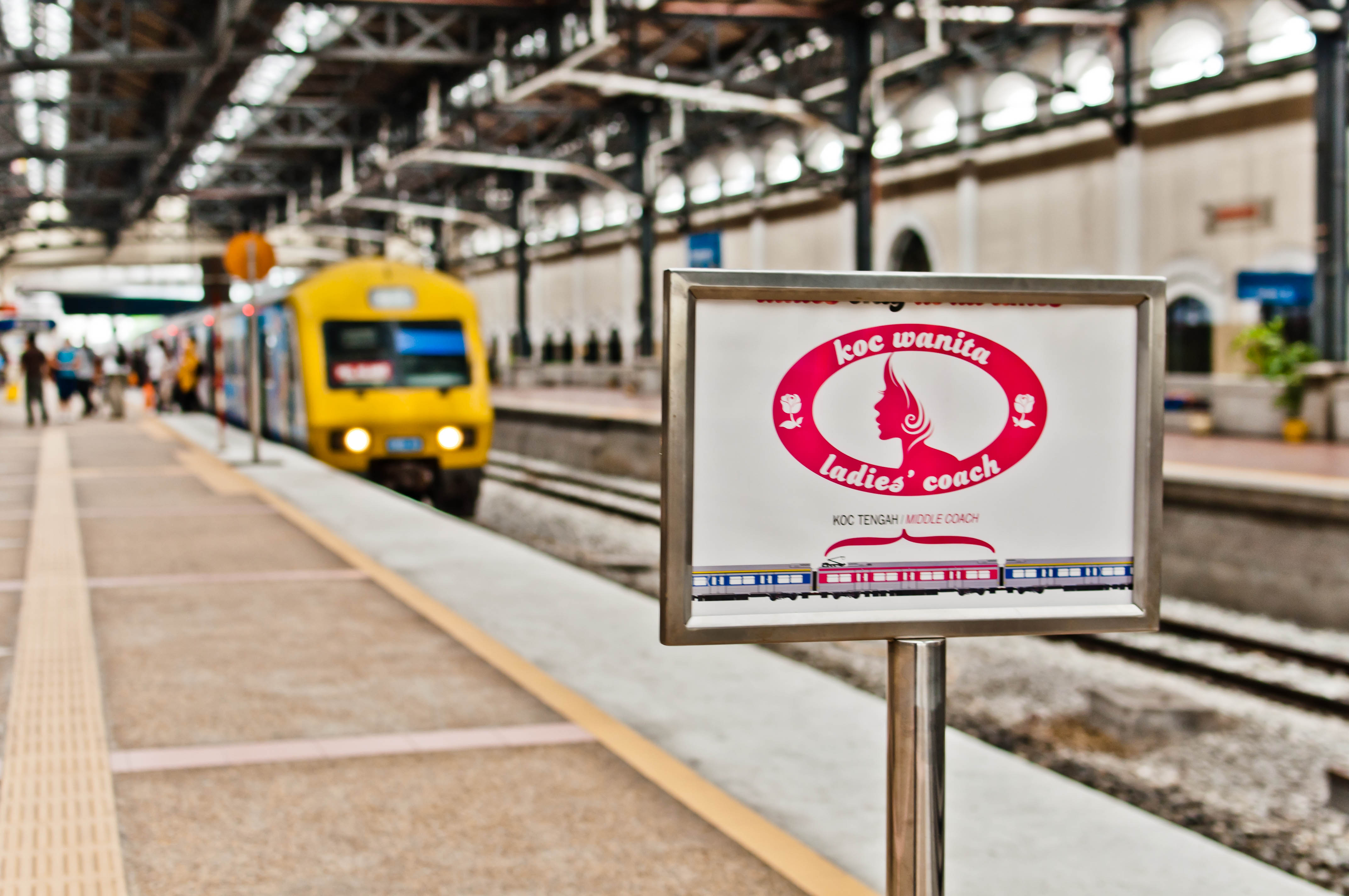
A designated commuter section for women only in Kuala Lumpur.

In Malaysia, sexual harassment, as defined by the Employment Act 1955, is "any unwanted conduct of a sexual nature, whether verbal, non-verbal, visual, gestural or physical, directed at a person which is offensive, humiliating or a threat to their well-being." The Act does not distinguish between male and female or employer and employee. As such, sexual harassment can be committed by a female against a male, or an employee against an employer.

Sexual harassment is common, and since 2010 trains on Malaysian railways have included pink-coloured women-only cars as a means of cutting down on it. There are also women-only buses in Kuala Lumpur since 2010. In 2011, the government launched a women-only taxi service in the greater Kuala Lumpur area. The taxis have women drivers, and operate on an on-call basis.

== Disability rights ==
Discrimination against the disabled is legal, but the government promotes the acceptance and employment of such persons. While new government buildings are designed with disabled people in mind, older buildings and public-transportation vehicles are not. A lower excise duty is charged on cars and motorcycles designed for disabled persons. The Ministry of Human Resources is tasked with protecting disabled rights. A Persons with Disabilities Act was passed in 2008 but violators are not penalised. In the wake of the United Nations Human Rights Council's Universal Periodic Review of Malaysia in 2009, Malaysia ratified the Convention on the Rights of Persons with Disabilities, though with certain reservations.

== Indigenous people's rights ==
For the most part, indigenous people do not participate in decisions affecting their lives, and their rights are not effectively protected. Under the Aboriginal People's Act, members of indigenous groups do not have land rights, and logging firms encroach on their traditional lands. Although for a long time indigenous persons were often deprived of their lands without due process, this situation has improved in recent years. Malaysia is signatory to the United Nations Declaration on the Rights of Indigenous Peoples (UNDRIP), but has still not ratified ILO Convention 169.

The 20-point agreement, or the 20-point memorandum, is a list of 20 points drawn up for North Borneo, proposing terms for its incorporation into the new federation as Sabah, during negotiations prior to the formation of Malaysia on 16 September 1963. Some of the twenty points were incorporated, to varying degrees, into what became the Constitution of Malaysia; others were merely accepted orally, thus not gaining legal status. Point 12: Special position of indigenous races ~ "In principle the indigenous races of North Borneo should enjoy special rights analogous to those enjoyed by Malays in Malaya, but the present Malaya formula in this regard is not necessarily applicable in North Borneo".

== Trafficking in persons ==
Malaysia, according to Amnesty International, "is a destination and, to a lesser extent, a source and transit country for women and children trafficked for the purpose of commercial sexual exploitation, and men, women, and children for forced labour... Malaysia improved from Tier 3 to the Tier 2 Watch List for 2008 when it enacted comprehensive anti-trafficking legislation in July 2007."

As of 2021, Malaysia is listed as a Tier-3 country.

== Official persecution of minorities ==
=== Laws favouring Islam ===
Islam is the sole official religion of Malaysia. The Constitution of Malaysia declares that Malay are by definition a Muslim, who habitually speaks the Malay language and conforms to Malay customs. Conversion from Islam to another religion is against the law, but the conversion of non-Muslims to Islam is actively pursued through institutionalised means and discriminatory laws against non-Muslims. The government actively promotes conversion to Islam in the country. The discriminatory law requires that any non-Muslims who wish to marry a Muslim must first convert to Islam, or else the marriage is considered illegal and void.

There have also been reports where in a non-Muslim family, one of the parents decided to convert to Islam and also unilaterally convert his or her children to become Muslim, either against the children's will or without the consent of the other parent, with the conversion usually upheld by Shariah courts. However, this practice has been declared illegal in 2018 by the Federal Court in the landmark case of Indira Gandhi Mutho v. Pengarah Jabatan Agama Islam Perak & Ors. The Federal Court also unanimously declares that such unilateral conversion of children to Islam without both parents' consent is deemed void and invalid by the Malaysian Constitution. Malaysia civil courts have since then repeatedly affirmed this ruling by quashing unilateral conversion of children to Islam.

=== Persecution of Hindus ===
People of Indian descent are derogatorily called keling in Malaysia. In many modern cases, keling is used as a derogatory term. It was used in 2005 by members of parliament because of misconception about ethnic Indians, which resulted in an uproar accusing the members of parliament of racism.

There are numerous cases in Malaysian courts relating to official persecution of Hindus. For example, in August 2010, a Malaysian woman, Siti Hasnah Banggarma, was denied the right to convert to Hinduism by a Malaysian court. Siti Hasnah Banggarma, who was born a Hindu, but was forcibly converted to Islam at age 7, desired to reconvert back to Hinduism and appealed to the courts to recognise her reconversion. The appeal was denied. In 2016, an association of eight Hindu NGOs found that about 7,000 Hindus in Malaysia wrongly documented as Muslims. This problem was widespread throughout Peninsular Malaysia and involved mostly practising Hindus from the lower income group who are documented as Muslims.

=== Destruction of Hindu temples ===
Between April and May 2006, several Hindu temples were demolished by city hall authorities in the country, accompanied by violence against Hindus. On 21 April 2006, the Malaimel Sri Selva Kaliamman Temple in Kuala Lumpur was reduced to rubble after the city hall sent in bulldozers. The authorities' excuse was that these temples were unlicensed and squatting on government land.

== LGBT rights ==
Both section 377 of the Penal Code as well as several state-level shariah laws criminalise homosexuality and sodomy. Laws forbidding sodomy and unnatural carnal intercourse are occasionally enforced, and there is considerable social prejudice founded in the Islamic view of homosexuality, although the situation in this regard is reportedly improving. Gays are not permitted to appear in the state media, and cannot be depicted in films unless the gay characters "change their ways by the end of the story".

In two speeches given in June and July 2012 to Muslim groups, Prime Minister Najib Razak described gays as a "deviant culture" that had no place in Malaysia. In December of that year, Human Rights Watch decried Najib's remarks, saying that his "actions against LGBT people are a glaring contradiction to his self-proclaimed profile as a 'global moderate' leader." Those actions include shutting down a November 2011 sexual-diversity festival and a government programme to train people to "convert gays".

The Malaysian establishment's view of LGBT rights was reflected in a 12 September 2012, letter to a Malaysian newspaper by the vice president of the Muslim Lawyers Association of Malaysia, Azril Mohd Amin. Writing about the proposed declaration of human rights by the ASEAN countries, Azril, wrote that: "There will be attempts by LGBTs, NGOs, and various other activists to include LGBT rights and the right of absolute freedom of religion in the declaration." But if such rights were included in the declaration, "Malaysia as a Muslim-majority country would have to reiterate her strong objections; as such a policy clearly contradicts the principles enshrined in the religion of Islam." According social recognition to LGBT people "would be confusing and destructive to the development and witness of our own children... Malaysian and those who are against LGBT rights are thereby protecting the human race from the secular fallacy, perpetrated by the United Nations, that human beings may do as they please, within their so-called 'sovereign borders' (as laid down by the European powers)."

== Rights of refugees and asylum seekers ==
Malaysia is not a party to the 1951 United Nations Convention Relating to the Status of Refugees and its 1967 Protocol, and it has no provision for the granting of asylum or refugee status or for protecting persons from being returned to countries where their lives are in danger. Nonetheless, Malaysia does co-operate with the United Nations Human Rights Council (UNHRC) by not deporting registered refugees whose resettlement in other nations is being arranged. Illegal immigrants and asylum seekers are held in immigration detention centres (IDCs). Since 2009, Malaysia has not deported persons carrying UNHRC refugee cards. Refugees may work but are not provided with access to education. Immigration officials used to be accused of trafficking IDC-held refugees to Thailand to be sold into slavery, but no such accusations were made in 2010.

According to Amnesty International, officers of RELA (Ikatan Relawan Rakyat), a civilian volunteer force empowered to arrest migrants and refugees, "often extort money from migrants and refugees, and sometimes beat them."

=== Refugee employment in Malaysia ===
At present, refugees in Malaysia do not have the right to work. The Employment Act only applies to citizens and registered foreign employees. No foreign citizen can enter Malaysia validly without a valid Entry Permit, therefore refugees in Malaysia are not considered as a "foreign employee".

Despite that, 60% of refugee adults in Malaysia are employed, and Rohingya refugees are already part of the workforce in industries that face labour shortages such as the service industry and the informal employment sector.

A study by IDEAS Malaysia suggests that tax contribution would increase to RM50 million a year by 2024 if they were given the right to work.

On 31 October 2023, the Human Resources Ministry in Malaysia stated that it is currently examining an appropriate mechanism to allow refugees registered with the UNHCR to seek employment. However, these jobs will be limited to those that are 'Dirty, Dangerous, and Difficult". This move was criticised by rights groups as a "face for the government's lack of empathy over the plight of refugees."

=== Rohingya refugee detainees ===
Tens of thousands of Rohingya, a mostly Muslim minority who have long been persecuted in Myanmar, have sought safety in Malaysia with many risking dangerous boat journeys to get to the country following a brutal military crackdown in 2017. Malaysia detains these individuals in detention centers in order to deter others from entering the country. The United Nations refugee agency UNHCR It said it was ready to work with the Malaysian government on alternatives to detention, especially for children and the elderly. “Depriving individuals of their liberty in order to deter others from entering the country is unlawful, inhumane and ineffective,” the statement said. “Seeking asylum is not an unlawful act. In all cases detention should be a measure of last resort, should be authorized by the law and only undertaken if necessary and reasonable in all the circumstances, and proportionate to a legitimate aim.

== Employee rights ==
Most workers can join unions, but this right is restricted by the Trade Unions Act (TUA) and the Industrial Relations Act (IRA), as well as by other laws limiting the freedom of association. The right to strike is so severely limited that striking is effectively impossible. Private-sector workers are allowed to engage in collective bargaining. Malaysia's minimum wages policy is decided under the National Wages Consultative Council Act 2011 (Act 732). Forced labour is illegal, but occurs, with many women and children essentially being forced to work in households, and many of them suffering abuse. Children under 14 are not allowed to work but some exceptions are permitted. The Employment Act limits working hours and imposes other restrictions, but they are not enforced strictly. The United States Department of Labor's List of Goods Produced by Child Labor or Forced Labor indicates that instances of child labour and forced labour have been observed in the electronics and the textile industries as well as in the production of palm oil. Many foreign employees work under unfair and abusive conditions, with employers withholding pay and confiscating passports. There is an Occupational Safety and Health Act, but workers who walk out of dangerous workplaces are subject to dismissal.

=== Forced labour concerns ===
In 2020, the U.S. Customs and Border Protection (CBP) had banned Malaysian products of Sime Darby Plantation, the world's biggest palm oil planter by land size, from entering the United States, citing reasonable suspicion of use of forced labour. That allowed the authorities to detain goods at ports. In January 2022, the U.S. Customs and Border Protection (CBP) published a finding that Sime Darby Plantation was using forced labour on its plantations in Malaysia to harvest fresh fruit bunches used to extract palm oil and produce derivatives. This finding would allow CBP to seize the firm's products. In April 2022, Cargil announced that it had halted palm oil purchases from Sime Darby as the company had not presented sufficient information to address forced labor allegations by the U.S.

=== Migrant worker housing standards ===
The vast majority of Malaysia's 2 million documented migrant workers live in accommodation that does not meet Malaysia's housing standards, according to the Ministry of Human Resources. Companies have been accused of demanding excessive overtime, not paying wages, retaining workers’ identity documents and keeping them in debt bondage.

==== Pact with Indonesia ====
On 1 April 2022, Malaysia and Indonesia signed a memorandum of understanding on the placement and protection on Indonesian migrant workers in Malaysia. The One Channel System regulates the entire process of recruiting, placing and repatriating Indonesian migrant workers in Malaysia. On 13 July 2022, Indonesia announced a freeze on sending its citizen migrant workers to Malaysia, citing a breach in the One Channel System, which was linked to allegations of trafficking and forced labour.

== Rights of persons under arrest ==
Warrantless arrests are not permitted, and suspects may be held without charge for up to three weeks with a magistrate's permission. Suspects are sometimes released and then re-arrested, often questioned without being offered legal representation, and occasionally denied family visits. Detention of material witnesses in criminal cases is permitted. Pre-trial detention can last several years. Several laws permit the detention of suspects without judicial review or the filing of charges.

In addition, there have been several cases of extra-judicial enforced disappearances. In 2017, a Christian pastor Raymond Koh, and a Shia Islam practitioner, Amri Che Mat, were abducted by agents of the Malaysian Special Branch. In 2025, businesswoman Pamela Ling was alleged to have been abducted by government authorities.

Previously under the now-repealed Internal Security Act (ISA), police were permitted to arrest and detain for 60 days, without warrant or counsel or judicial review, persons who acted "in a manner prejudicial to the national security or economic life of Malaysia." The ISA did not permit judicial review of most ISA decisions, and the United Nations Human Rights Council considered the ISA inconsistent with the Universal Declaration of Human Rights. In 2012, the ISA was repealed and replaced by Security Offences (Special Measures) Act 2012 (SOSMA) under Najib Razak's administration.

Under SOSMA, "initial police detention is cut to a maximum of 28 days, after which the attorney-general must decide whether to prosecute and on what charges." But "judicial oversight is notably absent during the first 24 hours of police custody and such absence can be extended to the entire 28-day investigatory period." While SOSMA "promised to ease incommunicado detention by mandating immediate notification of next-of-kin and access to a lawyer chosen by the suspect," in fact "initial access can be postponed for 48 hours should a higher level police officer consider it prudent; another serious violation of an individual's due process rights."

The Emergency Ordinance (EO) empowers the Home Affairs Minister to issue an order to detain persons for up to two years to preserve public order or prevent violent crimes. In 2009, 548 persons were held under the EO. Suspected drug traffickers, including those already freed by ordinary court processes, may be arrested and held for 39 days without trial or a detention order, and thereafter held without charge indefinitely, with their detention approved every two years by an advisory board. In 2009, over 1,000 persons were detained in this fashion. Under the Restricted Residence Act, the Home Affairs Minister may compel individuals to live in residences other than their homes and to remain within the neighbourhood; such an order can be renewed indefinitely by authorities.

In 2009 alone, police killed 108 persons during arrests. Torture as such is not illegal. In the past there were many allegations of abuse in immigration detention centres and of persons detained under the ISA, but the number of such allegations declined considerably in 2010.

In 2017, Ri Jong Chol, a North Korean citizen living in Malaysia, was arrested as a murder suspect. After his release, Ri told the media that he was coerced into making false accusations and that the police had threatened to hurt his wife and two children.

== Rights of persons on trial ==
The Constitution provides for a dual justice system, under which secular law and sharia (syariah) law are both recognised, and secular criminal and civil courts co-exist with sharia courts. Sharia law applies only to, and sharia courts have jurisdiction over, only Muslims. In some states, sharia courts solely or principally adjudicate family and personal law, while in other states they are empowered to pass judgment on criminal matters.

Malaysia's secular law is based on English common law. Defendants in serious criminal cases are entitled to government-paid lawyers. Pre-trial discovery in criminal cases is limited. Testimony by witnesses is sometimes disallowed. Defendants are not routinely entitled to see evidence held by the government. The right to appeal is sometimes restricted.

Due process rights are sometimes compromised. Women do not enjoy equal treatment in sharia courts, especially in divorce and child custody cases.

Privacy rights are sometimes infringed upon, with the authorities monitoring emails sent to websites and police permitted to search homes, confiscate items, and take people into custody without a warrant. Officials from the Department of Islamic Development Malaysia (JAKIM) may even enter private premises without a warrant if they suspect Muslims are gambling, consuming alcohol, or committing adultery. Messages sent or received by individuals suspected of corruption or terrorism may be intercepted.

Under the new SOSMA legislation, the prosecutor at a trial is permitted to keep secret the identity of prosecution witnesses, thus preventing cross-examination. SOSMA also revised the rules of evidence, enabling prosecutors to use information without disclosing sources.

== Rights of inmates ==
Prisoners suffer from overcrowding, poor food, and irregular water supplies. Inmates are allowed visitors. Religious observance is allowed, provided the religion in question is not one of 56 Islamic sects considered "deviant". Medical care is poor, with hundreds dying of communicable diseases in immigration detention centres, prisons, and jails from 2001 to 2007. Non-governmental organisations and the media are usually not allowed to monitor conditions in prison. Preventive and investigative detention are permitted. Police are provided with human rights training. Caning is allowed as a disciplinary measure for aggravated offences committed by inmates while they are serving their sentences in prison.

== Capital and corporal punishment ==
Malaysia retains both capital punishment (in the form of long-drop hanging) and corporal punishment (in the form of caning on the bare buttocks) for certain criminal offences; the latter is applicable only to male criminals. A 6 December 2010 report by Amnesty International entitled A Blow to Humanity criticises the practice of judicial caning in Malaysia and concludes the punishment "subjects thousands of people each year to systematic torture and ill-treatment, leaving them with permanent physical and psychological scars". The report describes the process as follows: "In Malaysian prisons specially trained caning officers tear into victims' bodies with a metre-long cane swung with both hands at high speed. The cane rips into the victim’s naked skin, pulps the fatty tissue below, and leaves scars that extend to muscle fibre. The pain is so severe that victims often lose consciousness."

Under sharia law, several dozen offences, such as alcohol consumption, are punishable by sharia-style caning, which is different from judicial caning and is applicable to both male and female Muslims.

Under Malaysian criminal law, before 2023, the death penalty was mandatory for persons found guilty of possessing illegal drugs above certain quantities; in 2010, 114 people were sentenced to death.

However in 2023, mandatory death penalty was abolished for all crimes in Malaysia, with the Abolition of Mandatory Death Penalty Act 2023 come into force on 4 July 2023. This changes allow the judges to either impose the death penalty, or 30 to 40 years imprisonment in addition to whipping, at their own discretion and on a case-by-case basis.

== Political controversies ==
In November 2007, two of the largest political rallies since 1998 took place in Kuala Lumpur, challenging the government of Prime Minister Abdullah Badawi. The Bersih rally was held on 10 November and the Hindu Rights Action Force rally on 25 November. The Bersih rally was organised by a number of non-governmental organisations and opposition political parties to demand electoral reform in Malaysia and about 50,000 people took to the streets. The rally was attended by at least 10,000 protesters, mainly ethnic Indians, demanding equal social and economic rights from the Bumiputras. Tamil politicians from India such as M. Karunanidhi also came out in support of ethnic Indians in Malaysia by demanding that the Indian government take up their matter with their Malaysian counterparts.

In a letter dated 10 December 2007, the Ministry of Internal Security banned the Malay-language section of the Catholic Herald due to its use of "Allah" to refer to God in Christianity. This led to a court case, in which the Federal Court of Malaysia ruled that there was no constitutional right for non-Muslims to use the word "Allah".

On 14 May 2014, Prime Minister Najib Razak was quoted as saying that said Islam and its followers are now being tested by new threats under the guise of humanism, secularism, liberalism and human rights, although he later reversed his position three days later after coming under criticism.

== NGOs ==
- SUHAKAM (Human Rights Commission of Malaysia)
- SUARAM (Suara Rakyat Malaysia)
- SIS (Sisters in Islam)
- Malaysian Bar
- HINDRAF
- Amnesty International Malaysia
- WAO (Women's Aid Organisation)
- JFS (Justice for Sisters)
- Tenaganita

== See also ==
- Human Rights Commission of Malaysia
- Human trafficking in Malaysia
- Ketuanan Melayu
- Censorship in Malaysia
