= Ambiga Sreenevasan =

Malaysian lawyer

Yang Berbahagia Dato' Ambiga Sreenevasan DPMP
- அம்பிகா ஶ்ரீநிவாஸன்
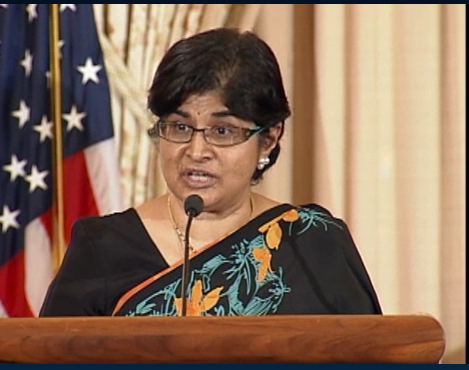
- Ambiga Sreenevasan speaks at the International Women of Courage Awards ceremony in 2009.

24th President of Malaysian Bar Council
- In office March 2007 – March 2009
- Deputy: Mr. Ragunath Kesavan
- Preceded by: Mr. Yeo Yang Poh
- Succeeded by: Mr. Ragunath Kesavan

Member of the International Commission of Jurists
- Incumbent
- Assumed office 2018 Serving with Chinara Aidarbekova (Kyrgyzstan), Gamal Eid (Egypt), Jamesina Essie L. King (Sierra Leone) and Michael Sfard (Israel)
- President: Robert K Goldman (USA)

Chairwoman of Bersih 2.0
- In office 2011 – 30 November 2013
- Preceded by: none
- Succeeded by: Maria Chin Abdullah

Chairperson of Bar Council Orang Asli Committee
- In office 2010–2012 Co-leading with Steven Thiru on 2011/2012 tenure
- Preceded by: Position established
- Succeeded by: Steven Thiruneelakandan & Hon Kai Ping (Co-chair)

Independent Director of Securities Industry Dispute Resolution Centre
- In office 2011–2013

Executive Committee of Women's Aid Organisation
- In office 2009–2010

President of National Human Rights Society (HAKAM)
- Incumbent
- Assumed office 2014
- Preceded by: Mr. Abdul Rashid Ismail

Member of Committee on Institutional Reforms
- Incumbent
- Assumed office 15 May 2018
- Appointed by: Council of Elders
- Prime Minister: Mahathir Mohamad

Personal details
- Born: 13 November 1956 (age 69) Seremban, Negeri Sembilan, Federation of Malaya (now Malaysia)
- Spouse: Mr. S. Radhakrishnan (grandson of S. S. Vasan)
- Education: University of Exeter, England
- Occupation: Lawyer
- Award(s): Darjah Dato' Paduka Mahkota Perak (DPMP), 2008
- International Women of Courage Award, 2009
- Honorary Graduate of University of Exeter, 2011–12
- Honorary Doctorate in Law (LLD) of University of Exeter, 2011
- Legion of Honour, 23 September 2011

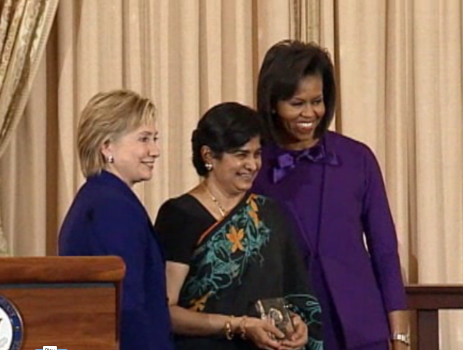
Ambiga Sreenevasan with Secretary of State Hillary Clinton and First Lady Michelle Obama

Ambiga Sreenevasan (Tamil: அம்பிகா ஶ்ரீநிவாஸன், romanized: Ambikā Śrīnivāsaṉ; born 1956) is a Malaysian lawyer and human rights advocate, and one of eight recipients of the US International Women of Courage Award in 2009. She was the president of the Malaysian Bar Council from 2007 to 2009, and co-chairperson of Bersih, an NGO coalition advocating for free and fair elections.

She previously served in the executive committee of the Women's Aid Organisation as well as in the Bar Council Special Committee on the rights of the indigenous Orang Asli people. She is a director of the Securities Industry Dispute Resolution Centre, and has been involved in the preparation and presentation of papers and memoranda on issues relating to the rule of law, the judiciary, the administration of justice, legal aid, religious conversion, and other human rights issues.

As former president of the Malaysian Bar, she played a significant role in the establishing of a panel of eminent persons, together with LAWASIA, the International Bar Association's Human Rights Institute and Transparency International-Malaysia in the year 2008. This panel reviewed the judicial crisis of 1988 and issued a report which was the first of its kind, setting an important precedent for organisations to establish their own panel inquiring into abuses of power.

In July 2011, she received an honorary Doctorate in Law (LLD) from the University of Exeter.

== Education, entry into law ==
Sreenevasan attended Convent Bukit Nanas in Kuala Lumpur, where she also served as head prefect in 1975. She graduated with a Bachelor of Laws (LLB) from the University of Exeter in 1979, and was called to the English Bar at Gray's Inn in 1980. After working in two London law firms, she was admitted to the Malaysian Bar in 1982.

== Career ==
Sreenevasan has been a practising advocate and solicitor since March 1982. She is a founding partner of Sreenevasan, Advocates & Solicitors. She had served as the president of Hakam, Malaysia's National Human Rights Society.

=== Malaysian Bar Council President 2007 – 2009 ===
Elected in March 2007, Sreenevasan is the second woman to serve as president of the Bar Council. Six months after assuming her leadership, she organised the "March for Justice," in Malaysia's administrative capital, calling for judicial reform and the investigation of a videotape allegedly showing a key lawyer fixing judicial appointments and judges' case assignments. Her public actions, and an intense lobbying campaign, led to the formation of a Royal Commission, which called for corrective action.

As a result of her attempts to resolve issues that continue to generate inter-ethnic tensions and constitutional problems, Sreenevasan received hate mail, death threats, and had a Molotov cocktail thrown at her house. Hundreds of people from religious groups and conservative members of government protested at the Bar Council building and called for her arrest.

In 2008, as President of the Malaysian Bar she played a significant role in the establishing, in collaboration with LAWASIA, the International Bar Association's Human Rights Institute and Transparency International-Malaysia, of a panel to review the judicial crisis of 1998. The panel issued a report that was the first of its kind, setting a precedent for the establishment of panels to inquire into abuses of power.

=== Bersih 2.0 rally ===
Sreenevasan chaired Bersih 2.0, the organisation behind the July 2011 rally in Kuala Lumpur that drew 20,000 people. She summed up the main issues raised by Bersih as "unhappiness... in the Sarawak [election], unhappiness about corruption, [and] unhappiness about the lack of independence of our institutions." She said demands made during the first rally in 2007 have not been addressed, hence the follow-up rally.

Sreenevasan later said that the rally "exploded many myths" in Malaysia, including the notion that people of different ethnic and religious backgrounds could not work together and that the middle class was "too comfortable to step up to the plate."

On September 21, 2012, Malaysia's New Straits Times published "Plot to destabilize government," which accused Bersih and other nongovernment organizations of plotting a conspiracy to destabilise the government using foreign funding. Sreenevasan and fellow Bersih organizers filed for defamation, which resulted in High Court Justice Lee Heng Cheong ordering the New Straits Times Press (NSTP) to pay damages to the plaintiffs. NSTP also issued an apology admitting the article was "false and without foundation."

Dato Ambiga was appointed to the International Commission of Jurists in 2018.

=== Memberships ===
She is a member of the Malaysian Intellectual Property Association and was its vice president in 2002. She is also a member of the International Association for the Protection of Intellectual Property (AIPPI). She headed Bersih 2.0, also called Coalition for Clean and Fair Elections, a citizen's movement for free and fair elections. In 2015, she led the Bersih 3.0 rally.

== Honours ==
=== Malaysian honours ===
- Perak
  - Knight Commander of the Order of the Perak State Crown (DPMP) – Dato' (2008)

=== Foreign honours ===
- France
  - Knight of the Legion of Honour (2011)
