= National Human Rights Society =

Human rights organisation in Malaysia

- Persatuan Kebangsaan Hak Asasi Manusia; HAKAM
- Founded: 14 June 1991
- Founders: Former Prime Ministers Tunku Abdul Rahman Putra Al-Haj, alongside prominent civil activists Raja Aziz Addruse, Dr. Tan Chee Khoon and Tan Sri Ahmad Nordin
- Type: Non-profit; NGO
- Location: B-01, Ground Floor, Block B, Kompleks Pejabat Damansara, Jalan Dungun, Damansara Heights, 50490 Kuala Lumpur, Malaysia. Tel. : +603-2095 2122
- Services: Advocacy and practice of Human Rights
- Fields: Human Rights, Environment Rights, Activism
- President: Ambiga Sreenevasan
- Website: Official website
- Remarks: National Human Rights Society on Facebook

The National Human Rights Society (HAKAM; Malay: Persatuan Kebangsaan Hak Asasi Manusia) is a human rights non-governmental organisation (NGO) that works on human rights issues in Malaysia. HAKAM is considered to be one of the most vocal human rights NGOs in Malaysia. Anyone who is at least 18 years of age and a Malaysia citizen can be a member. There is a new member and renewal membership form.
