= Bersih 3.0 rally =

Malaysian democratic protest

- Part of Bersih movement
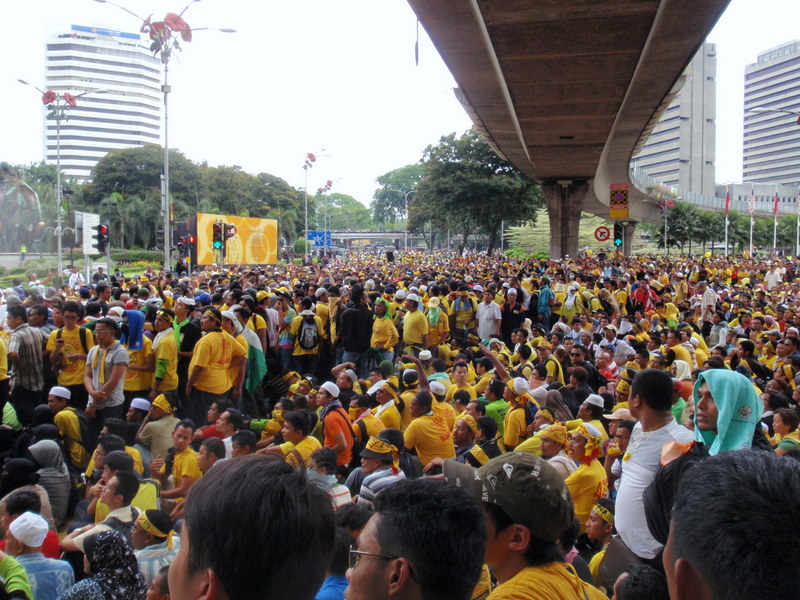
- Rallying crowd around the Kuala Lumpur city center
- Date: 28 April 2012
- Location: Kuala Lumpur, Malaysia
- Goals: To call for free and fair elections in Malaysia
- Status: Concluded

Parties
Bersih; Pakatan Rakyat; Himpunan Hijau	Election Commission; Government of Malaysia; Royal Malaysia Police; RELA Corps

Lead figures
Anwar Ibrahim; Ambiga Sreenevasan; A. Samad Said; Wong Tack	Najib Razak; Hishammuddin Hussein; Ismail Omar

Number
Official estimation: 22,000 Independent estimation: 80,000 – 100,000 Bersih estimation: 250,000 – 300,000 worldwide	

Casualties and losses
60 local demonstrators injured, 512 arrested	20 policemen injured 12 vehicles damaged

The Bersih 3.0 rally (also called Sit In rally or Duduk Bantah in Malay) was the second largest democratic protest in Malaysia. This rally was organised as a follow-up to the 2011 Bersih rally and the 2007 Bersih rally. The rally, organised by the Coalition for Clean and Fair Elections (Bersih), was supported by Pakatan Rakyat, the coalition of the three largest opposition parties in Malaysia along with other small political parties like Parti Sosialis Malaysia and social organisations such as Malaysian Trades Union Congress, Human Rights Commission of Malaysia (SUHAKAM) and Malaysian Bar.

In addition, Bersih 3.0 was endorsed by 84 NGOs. In particular, it was joined by Himpunan Hijau (Green Assembly), a civil movement protesting the Lynas rare earth project in Malaysia. In addition to the main rally at Kuala Lumpur, smaller rallies were held in 10 other cities in Malaysia, as well as in 34 other countries. Following the last rally in 2011, the government of Malaysia organised a Public Select Committee (PSC) to look into electoral reforms in Malaysia, which released their proposals in April 2012.

Seven of the eight demands by the Bersih have been included in the 22 recommendations submitted by the PSC. PSC Committee member P. Kamalanathan said only one demand by Bersih, on a minimum 21 days campaign period, was not included because it was not suitable to be implemented in Sabah and Sarawak. However, the matter was still being considered, where the current campaign period of seven days had been extended to 10 days. Bersih claimed that PSC proposals were half-hearted and accused the Election Commission of Malaysia (EC) of being insincere in introducing electoral reforms. Bersih has stated that they would call off the rally if the Malaysian government gave a guarantee that electoral reforms take place before the next Malaysian general elections.

== Background ==
=== Bersih ===
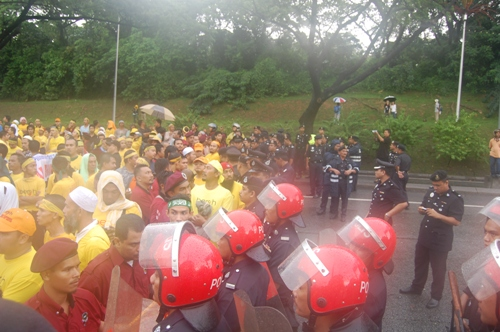
A scene from the 2007 rally. Protestors on the left are dressed in yellow. They are met by the Federal Reserve Unit (FRU), the riot control force (in red helmets). Standing in between the protestors and the FRU are PAS's Jabatan Amal volunteer unit (dressed in maroon).

Bersih, short for the Coalition for Clean and Fair Elections (Malay: Gabungan Pilihanraya Bersih dan Adil), is a coalition of 62 non-governmental organisations founded in November 2006. Since its founding, Bersih has been supported by the three main opposition parties, Parti Keadilan Rakyat (PKR), PAS, and DAP. Bersih is the Malay word for "clean."

Bersih, is chaired by former Bar Council president Ambiga Sreenevasan. Ambiga served as president of the Bar from 2007 to 2009 and is a recipient of the US State Department's International Women of Courage Awards.

The first Bersih rally on 10 November 2007 was estimated to have drawn between 30,000 and 50,000 people. It was broken up by police using tear gas and chemical-laced water cannons. The rally was said to play a major role in helping the opposition parties make big gains in the 2008 general election. The second rally on 9 July 2011 was met with similar force by the police after they tried to make their way to the Merdeka Stadium.

==== Bersih's demands ====
The Bersih's initial demands were:

1. Clean the electoral roll
2. Reform postal voting
3. Use of indelible ink
4. A minimum campaign period of 21 days
5. Free and fair access to mainstream media
6. Strengthen public institutions
7. Stop corruption
8. Stop dirty politics

These demands were later agreed by the government prior to the 2012 protests except for one demand.

Following the government's agreement to the demands, Bersih shifted to demanding the resignation of the entire Election Commission, a demand which analysts consider unreasonable.

==== Public select committee ====
The Parliamentary Select Committee (PSC) on Electoral Reforms was formed in the aftermath of the 2011 Bersih rally. The committee, consisting of five Barisan Nasional MPs, three Pakatan Rakyat MPs and one Independent MP, came up with 22 recommendations for reforming the electoral system in Malaysia. However an opposition minority report was rejected by the parliament speaker without further debate.

== Lead up to the rally ==
=== Announcement ===
Early in April 2012, the Public Select Committee released a report of their findings on electoral reform. The speaker in the Dewan Rakyat, or House of Representatives, passed the report with no debate between the opposition and ruling parties. An opposition minority report was not included in the final report. So far, none of Bersih's demands have been met, and with indications that the Malaysian Government would be calling a general election without any electoral reforms, Bersih announced a third rally for clean and fair elections for 28 April 2012.

=== Non-government organisations ===
Bersih has been backed by the Bar Council of Malaysia and Suhakam. The Malaysian Consultative Council of Buddhism, Christianity, Hinduism, Sikhism and Taoism (MCCBCHST) supports the Bersih's right for a peaceful assembly. Bersih 3.0 was also backed by Pertubuhan IKRAM Malaysia (IKRAM), an Islamic missionary NGO.

=== Government reaction ===
Home Minister Hishammuddin Hussein stated that the government over-reacted in its response to the Bersih rally in 2011. Hishammuddin has said that the government does not view the Bersih 3.0 rally as a security threat. He offered two alternative venues to that of Dataran Merdeka, Bukit Jalil National Stadium and Stadium Merdeka, but these were rejected by Bersih.

Information, Communications and Culture Minister Rais Yatim has described the Bersih ("clean") rally as "dirty", saying they do not respect the laws of the country.

After several meetings between Bersih and DBKL, no compromise was made regarding the choice of venue for the rally. DBKL erected barricades to prevent the sit-in rally by Bersih.

=== Court orders ===
The Malaysian High Court instructed the Hishammuddin to clarify whether Bersih is a banned organisation, especially since his recent statements were inconsistent regarding the organisation.

The Malaysian police received an order from Kuala Lumpur Magistrate Court barring any entry by Bersih into Dataran Merdeka and any rally gathering there would be considered illegal.

=== False claims ===
During the lead up to the rally, PKR secretary-general Saifuddin Nasution Ismail claimed in a Malay daily, that the Election Commission (EC) chairman and deputy chairman were members of the governing party, leading to claims of conflict of interest. Bersih stated they would give the two men the benefit of the doubt until more information surfaced.

Saifuddin alleged that EC chairman, Tan Sri Abdul Aziz Mohd Yusof is a member of Bunga Daisy UMNO branch under the Putrajaya division and his deputy, Datuk Wan Ahmad Wan Omar is a member of Kubang Bunggor UMNO branch under the Pasir Mas Kelantan Division. Wan Ahmad denied the allegations and in slamming the PKR secretary-general for the "big lie", he wanted the former to apologise for slandering him. In response to the demand to step down by the opposition, EC chairman said under the Constitution, the chairman and the deputy were appointed by the King, in line with advice from the Malay rulers. The EC Chairman stated that this was a sign of disrespect by the opposition of the royal institution.

The claims were later disproven when it was later discovered that the Abdul Aziz Mohd Yusof was a driver at the Prime Minister's Office, unrelated to the EC chairman. Then, a pensioner who runs a food stall in Kelantan, Wan Ahmad Wan Omar also came forward denying the allegation and said that Saifuddin had mistaken him for the EC deputy chairman. Both the national identification card and party membership numbers revealed by Saifuddin were actually his. UMNO Head Office also confirmed that both Tan Sri Abd Aziz and Datuk Wan Ahmad are not UMNO members.

== Protest ==
Despite the police roadblocks, independent journalists estimate a turn up of up to 100,000 people, although the organisers themselves claimed up to 300,000 people turned up for the rally in Kuala Lumpur. Nearly 58 roads leading into the city were blocked by the police. Protestors gathered at several points in the city such as Masjid Negara, Masjid India, Pasar Seni, Kuala Lumpur Convention Centre (KLCC), Brickfields and Jalan Sultan before proceeding to Dataran Merdeka.

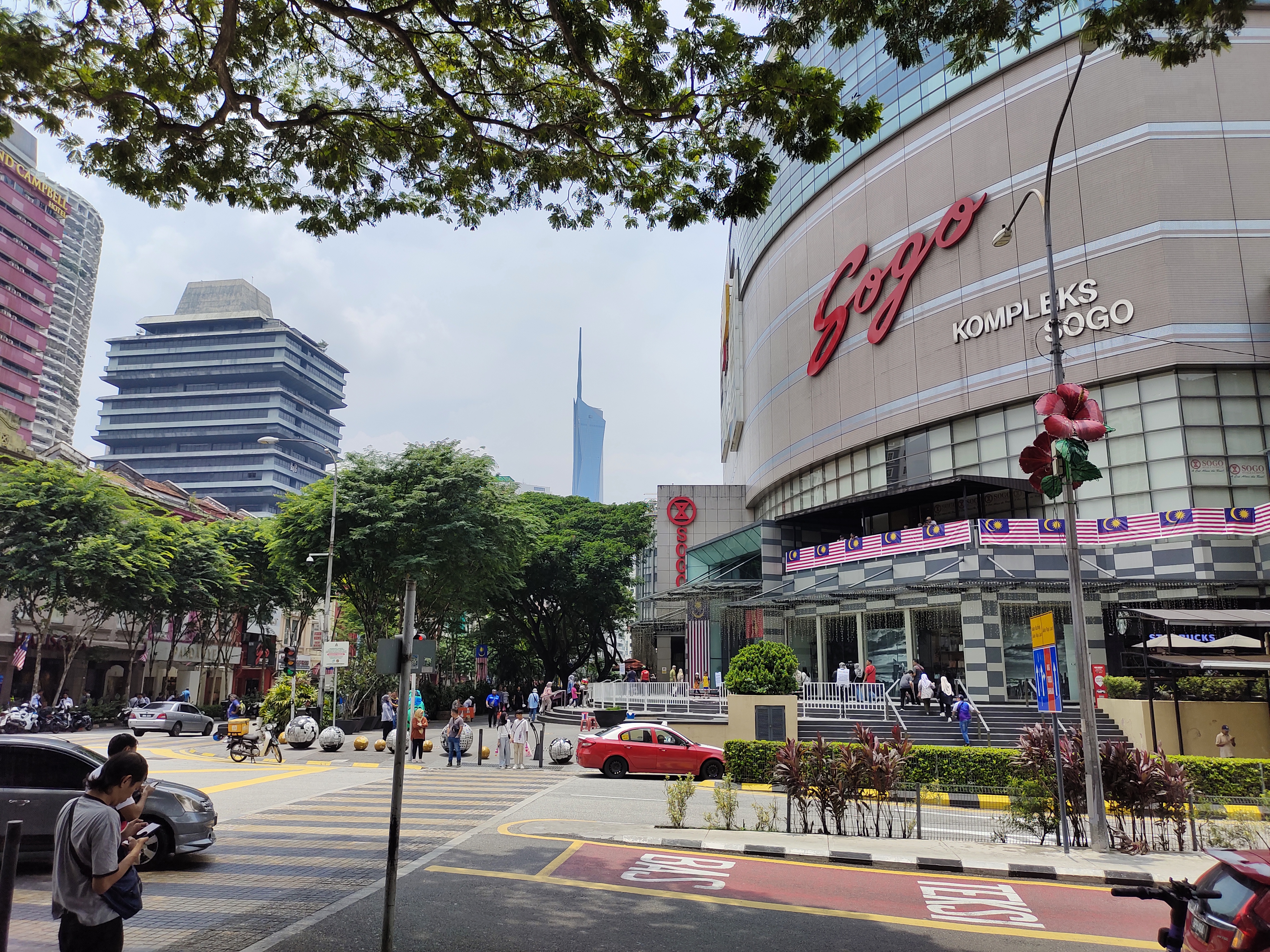
KL Sogo Complex, one of the assembly points and where a journalist was assaulted by the protestors.

Prior to the protest, a minor unrest was reported when a group of people attacked a police patrol car passing through Dataran Merdeka at around 3 AM, around 10 hours before the protest even began. The crowd chanted abuse, hitting the patrol car and banging on its bonnet.

The protest itself initially began peaceful. However, at around 2:55 PM, protestors at Dataran Merdeka eventually broke into the barrier and the crowd darted into the barricaded area. Less than two minutes later, the police began using tear gas and water cannons to disperse the protestors.

A police car was overturned after the driver was beaten up, causing the car to crash into a sidewalk.

Multiple violent incidents were reported, including police vehicles being assaulted by protestors. One such incident involved the policeman driving the car being knocked unconscious after being attacked while he was driving, causing him to crash into a pavement outside a shopping mall, injuring two protesters. The car would later be overturned by the protesters.

During the same incident, a journalist who was trying to save the unconscious policeman, was beaten by the protesters, marking one of the many incidents of violence and hostility towards journalists during the protest.

Some protesters were beaten by over a dozen police which kicked and punched or surrounded the latter. There are protesters which are beaten by sticks and even beaten even though they are being carried to the detention centre without retaliation. When near the press, the police stopped all their harassments.

A total of 512 people were arrested for various offences in the rally, far less than the 1,667 detained in the Bersih 2.0 rally the previous year.

909 tear gas canisters and 58 tear gas grenades were used by the police against the protesters in the rally.

20 policemen were injured by protestors, and a total of 12 vehicles from the Malaysian police were damaged by the protestors during the protest.

Social media were used not only to organise the rally, but to spread the mission of Bersih 3.0.

The protest was participated by an estimated 100,000 people, making it the second largest democratic protest in Malaysia after the 1998 Reformasi protests which saw several hundred thousand participants.

Analysts consider the protest a bad event for the Malaysian government as well as the protest organisers themselves. For the government, it was the biggest show of defiance since the protest against the fourth Prime Minister of Malaysia, Mahathir Mohamad in the 1990s. However, for the protestors, the violent outcome of the protest defeated the core message of the movement's peaceful protests.

=== Other Malaysian cities ===
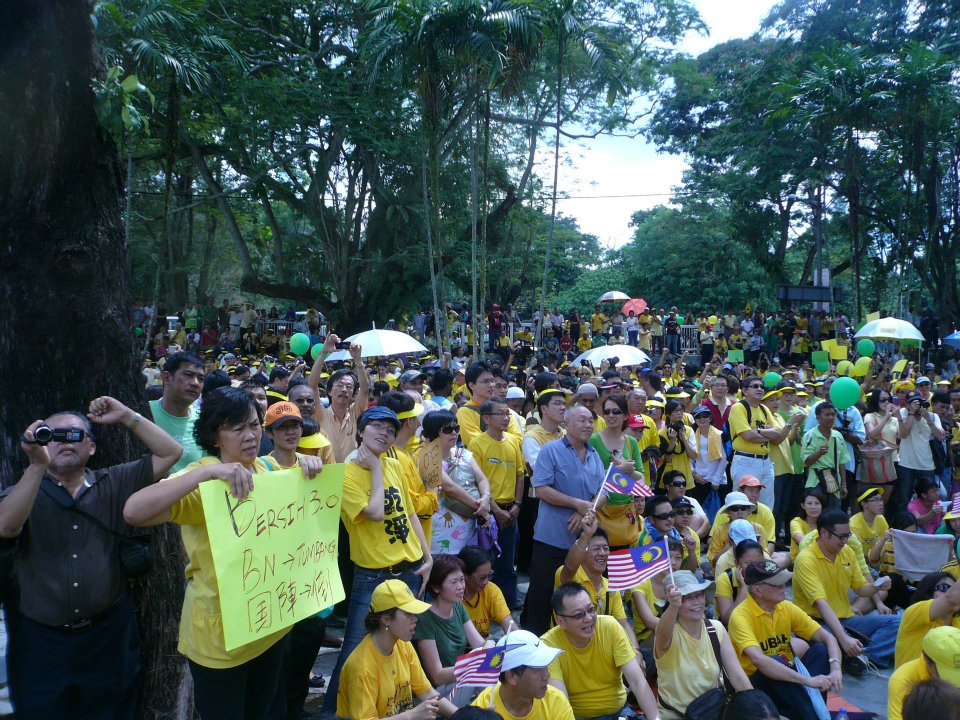
A scene from the rally in Padang Polo, Ipoh, Perak.

Simultaneous Bersih rallies were held in other cities throughout Malaysia such as Kota Kinabalu, Sabah, Kuching, Sarawak, Kuantan, Penang, Pahang; Ipoh, Perak; Miri, Malacca, Johor Bahru, and Johor.

=== Overseas rallies ===
In total there were rallies held in 35 countries and 85 cities around the world.

Large rallies were held in cities in Australia such as Sydney, Melbourne, Canberra, Hobart, Adelaide, Brisbane and Perth. Rallies in Singapore, Thailand and other Asian countries were also large.

Rallies were organised in India, Nepal, Sri Lanka, Bangladesh, Egypt, Saudi Arabia, South Africa, Japan, Jordan, South Korea, China, Taiwan (Taipei and Tainan), United States, Canada, Russia and various countries in Europe, including the United Kingdom; one of the largest of which was held in London, with smaller rallies being organised in Manchester, Nottingham, Newcastle, and Edinburgh.

== Aftermath ==
=== Statements of Malaysian Prime Minister ===
The Prime Minister of Malaysia, Najib Razak, gave remarks in the aftermath of the rally. Najib claimed that Bersih activists merely wanted to paint a negative image of the Government to the world and confront the police so that they could throw allegations of police brutality to the public. Najib also claimed that the organizers are not concerned about fair and clean elections, that the rally was politically motivated, and that it was conducted by supporters of Pakatan Rakyat in an attempt to take over Putrajaya.

=== International observers ===
International observers have described the Bersih rally as 'peaceful', 'festive' and 'exemplary'. However, international media reports the protest as being filled with rioting, mob, and violence.

In the aftermath of the protests, analysts said premier Najib Razak's reform credentials had been dented, which could force him to push back elections.

== Controversy ==
=== Fatwa ===
A few days before the violent demonstration, Kelantan Menteri Besar and Pan-Malaysian Islamic Party spiritual leader and politician, Datuk Seri Nik Abdul Aziz Nik Mat had reportedly issued a "fatwa" (Muslim non-binding legal opinion) that it is wajib (compulsory) for all Muslims to attend the rally and halal (permissible) to overthrow a 'sinful' government through street demonstrations.

=== Allegation of being hijacked by the opposition ===
A young Malaysian director, Benji Lim, alleged that the opposition have hijacked the rally and cause a harness to the protesters. Lim, standing among the reporters during Anwar Ibrahim press conference regarding the rally, said,

There is no leadership and people are not controlled. It were hijacked by the opposition.

Hishamuddin Hussein, said,

I know most of them are coming to the square, not all malicious. Some came in peace, but when it were hijacked by this group (opposition), I believe they also want us to take action and bring them to justice

A petition website were also made by Bersih supporters, dearambiga.com, which said in its introduction,

We are angry. Why? Because Bersih should be an NGO by the people for the people of all races, areas and political views. But in Bersih 3.0, some Pakatan Rakyat bosses took advantage of our noble cause for their own political interests and benefit!

Abdul Haleem Abdul Rahiman said that

During Bersih 3, the moment this particular political figure (Parti Keadilan Rakyat) started his provocative speech, me and my friends got up and left the scene for some chilled drinks. By the time we finished the first drink, the whole area turned into war zone.

Dato' S.Ambiga later denied that Bersih 3.0 rally were hijacked."No one can (hijack Bersih) if we remain focused and single-minded about ensuring reforms before the 13th general election".

PKR Youth chief, Shamsul Iskandar Md Akin later denied that the opposition have hijacked the rally and accused UMNO as it were a part of it "propaganda strategy"

=== Unruly behaviour of the participants ===
The Malaysian Bar, in its interim report on the gathering, said that words like sampah ('garbage') anjing ('dog') and anjing kurap ('mangy dog') were hurled at police and Federal Reserve Unit (FRU) who were on duty.

It said that at around 2:50 pm, near the barricades at Dataran Merdeka, some of its monitors observed rally participants shouting masuk, kita masuk ('enter, let's enter'). The opposition leader, Anwar Ibrahim was caught on video near one of the police barricades talking to one of his colleagues in which critics allege that he was inciting supporters to push aside the barriers. The police force then used water cannons as well as fired tear gas towards the participants after repeated warnings to disperse were ignored. The monitors, who were trapped within the crowd of participants, then heard a group of participants yelling undur, undur ('retreat, retreat'). However, some of the participants kept on shouting masuk, masuk ('enter, enter'), and some of the monitors later observed participants taunting policemen and FRU at another location, especially after tear gas and water cannons were used. According to the report, some of the participants also hurled words like anjing, anjing ('dogs, dogs') and anjing kurap ('mangy dog') at police and FRU officers.

The report said that some of the monitors heard rally participants calling police officers sampah ('garbage') as they passed the police line near the roundabout at Jalan Kinabalu, the police officers, however, did not heed what was said by the participants or retaliate. It further said that between 12 pm and 1 pm, participants at the intersection of Jalan Tun Perak, Jalan Tuanku Andul Rahman and Jalan Raja booed and jeered at policemen but there was no retaliation from the police. The report mentioned that rally participants, at times, threw objects like cans, empty plastic bottles and other items at police and City Hall vehicles moving along Jalan Tun Perak between 12 pm and 2 pm.

Participants were also criticised for bringing young children to the protests, exposing them to the dangerous environment of the violent protest. Police also recovered some suspicious objects at the rally presumed to be explosive materials, although it was never clear on who were the perpetrators.

Other noted incidents were:

1. At about 3 am in the early Saturday morning, an unruly mob attacked a police patrol car passing Dataran Merdeka. The crowd chanting abuse, hitting the patrol car and banging on its bonnet.
2. At 1:23 pm, protesters at Dataran throw plastic bottles at police trucks passing by, heading to Jalan Parlimen roundabout.
3. At 4:16 pm, in another violent incident, unruly demonstrators were seen assaulting a policeman driving a police patrol car, causing him to fall unconscious, leading to the car crashing onto the pavement and accidentally ran over two people outside a complex. The patrol car was vandalised thereafter. A journalist for a local TV station TV Alhijrah, who tried to protect the injured policeman was also assaulted by the protestors. The police car was later overturned by the protestors.
4. At 4:28 pm, several police jeeps parked outside Maju junction take off in a hurry as protesters kick and throw water bottles at them.
5. At 4:35 pm, a police gun was snatched by protestors.
6. At 5:15 pm, several protesters taunt FRU at Tune Hotel near Jalan Sultan Ismail.
7. At 6:20 pm, protesters at Masjid Jamek hurl things at passing police cars. Some car windows broken.
8. At 6:45 pm, an unidentified person threw a rock and smashed the window of a four-wheel vehicle with Special Action Force in it, near Jalan Parlimen roundabout.
9. A demonstrator was recorded viciously kicking a traffic police personnel after he fell from his motorcycle.
10. A traffic police, Mohd Nasir Abu Mansor claimed he and his partner were severely tortured by the protestors who were wearing red-coloured shirts at the Mara Complex in Jalan Raja Laut.
11. In an incident near KLCC, 15 protesters, believed to be from PAS' Unit Amal were recorded charging and broke through a human barricade formed by police personnel. The policemen, who were not in riot gear, purposely broke their human chain to avoid an altercation which would have happened if they had stood their ground, and telling each other, "biarkan, biarkan" (let them be, let them be).
12. In an incident, a woman participant was seen assaulting a foreign journalist verbally, calling him "you white idiot" and asking him to leave the country.

Most of the conducts were visible in over 30 video footages which were made publicly available by the Royal Malaysian Police.

=== Unprofessional conduct by the police force ===
According to an interim report by the Malaysian Bar Council, police brutality was widespread, with instances of savage beatings of civilians as well as arbitrary use of tear gas and water cannons. However, the same report admits that demonstrators had consistently provoked the police. The council noted that the demonstrators had booed, jeered and insulted with derogatory words but no retaliation came from the policemen. Home Minister, Hishammudin Hussein defended the police as "professional in controlling NGO rally, supported by opposition which turn as a chaos"

Between 9.30 am and 2.30 pm, majority of Bar Council monitors observed the police force (including the FRU team) appeared unperturbed by the participants, and some were courteous towards the participants. Around 12.00 pm, near the KLCC – between Jalan P Ramlee and Jalan Raja Chulan, crowds marched towards the direction of Jalan Tun Perak. Along the way, traffic police gave full co-operation and managed the traffic for the crowd to march. Monitors observed there was no disturbance at all. And for hours the police stood aside, looking relaxed and doing nothing. The peaceful rally later descended into chaos when police officers retaliated after the demonstrators removed the barbed wire and barriers at Dataran Merdeka and storm into the square, access to which was barred by a magistrate's court restraining order. Inspector General of Police Tan Sri Ismail Omar in a statement after the riots had pointed that the water cannon and tear gas was only fired to disperse rioters after they broke through police barricades, an action which made them breach the law, violate a court order and ignore the spirit of Peaceful Assembly Act 2012.

The Bar Council's report also noted that:

1. The rally was peaceful until around 3 pm when the police unleashed water cannon and tear gas on the crowd;
2. The use of force by the police without any obvious provocation or cause, was far worse, indiscriminate, disproportionate and excessive;
3. Police brutality was more widespread;
4. There was a concerted effort by the police to prevent and stop any recording of their actions and conduct;
5. Police fired tear gas directly at the crowd and their firing pattern was to box in the participants rather than allow them to disperse quickly
6. After which pockets of retaliatory behaviour was exhibited by some participants of the rally to the wrongful use of force by the police;
7. The police were observed taunting and mocking the crowd;
8. When items were thrown by some of the participants at the police, the police stooped to return like for like; and
9. Not all police personnel were wearing and displaying their police identification number on their uniforms.

The Bar Council further stated that the authorities had disregarded provisions within the United Nations Basic Principles on the Use of Force and Firearms by Law Enforcement Officials (UNBPUFF), the United Nations Code of Conduct for Law Enforcement Officials (UNCC), and Amnesty International guidelines.

However, the Bar Council report failed to cite the unruly and violent acts of the protestors that happened before 9.30 am, such as the attacks on police vehicles at 3 in the morning.

=== Violence and hostility towards journalists ===
Several journalists were attacked by protestors and police officers, where some photographers had their cameras and memory cards destroyed after taking photos of the protest.

TV AlHijrah journalist, Mohd Azri Mohd Salleh, was attacked by protestors while he was helping a policeman who was also being assaulted by other protestors. Mohd Azri suffered serious injuries which resulted in him being hospitalised in an intensive care unit at Kuala Lumpur Hospital, requiring 15 stitches to treat the injuries. Mohd Azri was on duty to report the protest, but his camera equipment was subsequently destroyed despite his efforts to protect it, although he managed to recover the video footages later. He was hit on his head using his own motorcycle helmet and other hard objects.

Malaysiakini photographer Koh Jun Lin was arrested and his camera equipment confiscated. Malay Mail confirmed that its photographer Arif Kartono was punched by police and his camera destroyed. Al-Jazeera's crew was roughed about and their camera damaged after they tried to film an officer beating up a protester.

The Inspector-General of Police, Ismail Omar promised that there will be investigations. He refuted an earlier statement made by the Home Minister, Hishammuddin Hussein, who claimed that the Standard Operating Procedure (SOP) of the police allows them to seize media equipment including cameras or memory cards.

A recording of the protest also showed a protestor verbally assaulting a foreign-looking journalist, calling him a "white idiot" and telling him to leave the country. The journalist would later reply to her, in Malay, saying "saya tinggal di sini" (I live here).

=== Unfair reporting ===
There are claims of widespread media blackout, biased reporting and censorship by the Malaysian mass media on the Bersih 3.0 event.

An international observer, Senator Nick Xenophon, of the Australian Senate, was accused of being anti-Islamic and pro-gay & lesbian in the New Straits Times, Utusan Malaysia and Berita Harian. The New Straits Times subsequently published a retraction and apology.

The Centre for Independent Journalism (CIJ) stated that there was significantly less print media coverage on Bersih 3.0, in comparison to Bersih 2.0 in 2011. CIJ began monitoring articles on Bersih 3.0 on 14 April 2012, two weeks before the scheduled 28 April rally, matching an identical study conducted which began two weeks before 9 July 2011 rally. CIJ monitored articles in four newspapers – Utusan Malaysia, New Straits Times, The Star and theSun – and showed between 90% and 60% drop in the volume of news coverage. Neutrality of the articles were also disputed, with two major newspapers providing largely negative view of the event. Overall, given the significance of Bersih 3.0, it was assumed that the major newspapers were deliberately toning down their Bersih coverage – either of their own accord, or due to interference from the government or the political parties which own them.

The BBC issued a statement seeking explanation over the apparent doctoring of one of its news reports by the Malaysian satellite broadcaster Astro. Two interviews with demonstrators were cut, as well as a partial deletion of the narration of the correspondence on how the violence was triggered after the event was concluded. Astro admitted to censoring BBC's coverage but expressed disappointment with the global news channel for failing to understand that they did so to comply with local guidelines.

== See also ==
- List of protests in the 21st century
