= Operation Lalang =

1987 Malaysian police crackdown

Operation Lalang (Operasi Lalang)
- Location: Kuala Lumpur, Malaysia
- Commanded by: Mohammed Hanif Omar
- Objective: to defuse racial tension that had reached "dangerous proportions"
- Date: 27 October – 20 November 1987
- Executed by: Malaysian Special Branch; Royal Malaysian Police
- Outcome: 119 people arrested, suspension of four newspapers
- Casualties: None

Operation Lalang (Malay: Operasi Lalang, also called Ops Lalang; lalang is Malay for cogon grass and this was taken to mean "Operation Weeding") was a major crackdown undertaken by the Royal Malaysian Police from 27 October to 20 November 1987, ostensibly to prevent the occurrence of race riots in Malaysia. The operation saw the arrest of 106 to 119 people—political activists, opposition politicians, intellectuals, students, artists, scientists and others—who were detained without trial under the Internal Security Act (ISA). It was the second largest mass arrest in Malaysian history involving the ISA since the 13 May riots 18 years earlier. It also involved the revoking of the publishing licenses of two dailies, The Star and the Sin Chew Jit Poh and two weeklies, The Sunday Star and Watan.

The Malaysian government argued that racial tensions had reached a dangerous level within the country, forcing the government to arrest those responsible for stoking the tensions. The notion that race riots were imminent however is contested, and it is widely believed that the operation was designed to control the political opponents of the Prime Minister Mahathir Mohamad. The event, which was followed by the 1988 Malaysian constitutional crisis the following year, marked the beginning of a period of Mahathir's authoritarian rule.

== Causes ==
A number of political developments and issues preceding the operation had caused mounting political and racial tensions in the country. According to the Malaysian government's white paper explaining the arrests, various groups had exploited the government's "liberal" and "tolerant" attitude and played up "sensitive issues", thereby creating racial tension in the country. This racial tension, the government said, forced the government to act "swiftly and firmly" to contain the situation.

=== Background issues ===
The crackdown happened against a backdrop in late 1986 and 1987 of a split within UMNO into two opposing groups, commonly referred to as Team A led by Mahathir, and Team B led by Tengku Razaleigh Hamzah and Musa Hitam. Mahathir was challenged for the leadership and narrowly won, but faced a subsequent legal challenge on his win.

There were also attacks by the government on several non-governmental organizations (NGO) which were critical of various government policies. Mahathir called these "intellectual elites" as "tools of foreign powers" and saboteurs of democracy.

In addition, a number of race and religion-related issues had arisen which had a cumulative effect in raising ethnic tension. These included the switch to Malay language as a medium of instruction for optional courses in the departments of Chinese and Tamil studies at the University of Malaya, the use of Chinese characters in certain signboards, the deputy president of the Malaysian Chinese Association (MCA) Lee Kim Sai questioning use of the term pendatang (immigrants) that was seen as challenging Malay's bumiputra status, as well as rumours of forced conversion to or from Islam.

=== Vernacular Chinese school personnel controversy ===
The immediate cause, however, was the Ministry of Education's decision to appoint some 100 senior assistants and supervisors to Chinese-medium primary schools. Concerns were raised by Chinese politicians and organizations that those appointed were Chinese who were not Chinese-educated, implying that students and parents might be forced to use English or Malay to communicate with the school personnel. Chinese educationalist groups contended that the move would limit the usage of Chinese in these schools.

On 11 October 1987, a 2,000-strong gathering was held by the United Chinese School Committees Association of Malaysia (UCSCAM, the association of Chinese school teachers and trustees, also known as Dong Jiao Zong) at the Hainanese Association Building beside the Thean Hou Temple in Kuala Lumpur. It was joined by prominent politicians from Chinese-based parties such as the MCA's Deputy President and Labour Minister Lee Kim Sai, the leader of Democratic Action Party (DAP) Lim Kit Siang, as well as representatives from GERAKAN and other parties. The meeting resolved to call a three-day boycott in Chinese schools if the government did not settle the appointments issue. The boycott was called off at the eleventh hour to allow time for the government to resolve the issue, nevertheless 57 schools went ahead with the strike on 15 October, either because they did not receive the notice of postponement, or they disagreed with the decision.

=== Response by UMNO Youth ===
Even though the boycott was officially postponed, the stage was set for a response from the Malays led by UMNO Youth. A mass rally of 10,000 was held at the TPCA Stadium on Jalan Raja Muda in Kampung Baru, Kuala Lumpur on 17 October. UMNO politicians condemned MCA leaders (both UMNO and the MCA are component parties of the ruling Barisan Nasional coalition) for their collusion with the Dong Jiao Zong and the opposition DAP. The UMNO protesters called for the resignations of MCA's Lee Kim Sai that mirrored the call for the resignation of UMNO Education Minister Anwar Ibrahim by the Chinese protesters. Najib Razak, then chairman of the UMNO Youth wing, led the Malay rally in Kampung Baru, Kuala Lumpur. During the rally, Najib was alleged to have threatened to soak a keris in Chinese blood, evoking fears of repeating the 13 May incident within the Chinese community. Many Chinese businesses around the city were closed for a few days for fear of any potential attacks from the Malay ultra-nationalists.

=== Prebet Adam amok incident ===
To make matters worse, a tinder box situation was created by an unrelated event on 18 October – the rampage of a Malay soldier, widely known as 'Prebet Adam', who killed a Malay and injuring two other persons with an M16 rifle in the Chow Kit area, which straddles two large Chinese and Malay communities.

=== Proposed UMNO rally ===
While Prime Minister Mahathir was away abroad, Sanusi Junid, the UMNO party secretary-general, and other UMNO leaders called for the holding of a large rally in Kuala Lumpur on 1 November to celebrate its 41st Anniversary. The rally was originally to be held in Johor Bahru but later changed to Kuala Lumpur, where UMNO leaders claimed would see the attendance of half a million members. The rally was cancelled after the Prime Minister returned and Operation Lalang was launched.

== Launch of Operation Lalang ==
On 27 October 1987, Mahathir together with the police launched an operation he said was necessary to defuse racial tension that had reached "dangerous proportions". He said that the country was facing an economic recession and high unemployment, and could not afford race riots. The operation was codenamed lalang after a type of weed found in Malaysia. According to Mahathir the decision for the operation was taken by the police, and that he, as the Minister of Home Affairs, had to go along with it. The Inspector General of Police Tan Sri Mohammed Hanif Omar said the police operation was for the sake of national security, and had nothing to do with politics.

The proposed UMNO rally was given as one of the reasons by the Inspector General of Police for the 27 October crackdown under the Internal Security Act. It was argued that had the rally been held, it could have sparked off race riots given the likely incendiary nature of the speeches of UMNO politicians. It has also been argued that the Prime Minister had to have a quid pro quo for cancelling the UMNO rally, therefore opposition leaders and civil libertarians were arrested in order to placate the disappointed would-be rally participants.

== Effects ==
The immediate effect of the operation was the arrest of a number of prominent political leaders, social activists and others, for incitement of racial sentiments and for showing Marxist tendencies. The publication licences of three newspapers were revoked. Mahathir also announced a nationwide ban on any gathering or rally, including those previously approved. Later in December 1987, Dr Mahathir introduced two pieces of legislation to impose additional restrictions on publications and grant police greater powers to curb public gatherings.

=== Arrests ===
The Prime Minister gave the approval for the arrest of 106 people, later increased to 119, under the Internal Security Act. The first 19 people were detained on 27 October 1987, rising to 54 by 10pm the next day, and later the night, the number grew to 63. By 20 November 1987, 106 had been arrested. Among the more prominent detainees were opposition leader and DAP Secretary-General Lim Kit Siang, DAP Deputy chairman Karpal Singh, MCA Vice-President and Perak Chief Chan Kit Chee, Malaysian Islamic Party (PAS) Youth Chief Halim Arshat, UMNO MP for Pasir Mas Ibrahim Ali, and UMNO Youth Education chairman Mohamed Fahmi Ibrahim. Other prominent non-political detainees included Dong Jiao Zong Chairman Lim Fong Seng, Publicity Chief of the Civil Rights Committee Kua Kia Soong, and Women's Aid Organisation member Irene Xavier. The MCA deputy president Lee Kim Sai had apparently been warned beforehand and he left for Australia for a few months the day the arrests began.

Of the politicians arrested, three were UMNO members, eight MCA, five Gerakan, fifteen PAS, sixteen DAP, and two PSRM. The three UMNO members arrested were closely associated with Mahathir's rivals, even though the UMNO's rallies were supported and initiated by Mahathir's allies (a further UMNO member who was a Mahathir ally was said to have been detained for an unrelated reason). The UMNO, MCA and Gerakan detainees were released within two months, while most of those from the opposition parties and NGOs were detained much longer.

The majority of the detainees had no connection with the events in Kuala Lumpur, for example, several Baptist Church members in Petaling Jaya were arrested for allegedly converting seven Malays, and at least nine PAS members were arrested for making claims about Christians converting Malays. Many of those detained were not involved in creating racial tensions; for example, Chandra Muzaffar, chairman of Aliran whose philosophy involves intercommunal cooperation, and members of Insan, a social reformist group that campaigned against exploitation of the poor, and Environment Protection Society of Malaysia, were also arrested.

Although most of the detainees were released either conditionally or unconditionally, 49 were served with two-year detention orders, with the last one being freed in April 1989. The detainees were first interrogated and kept at various police stations, those retained longer were sent to the Kamunting Detention Center, the usual place used for ISA detainees. Those who were detained longer included Lim Kit Siang, Karpal Singh plus five other party colleagues, a number of PAS members including Mohamad Sabu, and many social activists such as Tuang Pik King and Mohd Nasir Hashim.

Some of the prisoners detained during Operation Lalang were alleged to have been tortured during their captivity.

=== Curtailment of press freedom ===
In the afternoon the day following the first arrests, the Home Ministry withdrew the licences of the English language newspapers The Star and Sunday Star, the Chinese language Sin Chew Jit Poh, and the Malay language Watan. The Star was claimed to have being targeted as it had served as an outlet for alternative views from non-established groups as well as dissident opinions from Mahathir's rival Team B, and it and the other two were also the only domestic newspapers that regularly covered the activities of public interest groups. Former Prime Minister Tunku Abdul Rahman, who wrote a column for The Star, said that "we are on the road to dictatorship", a comment which wasn't reported by the other newspapers.

The Star, Sin Chew Jit Poh and Watan regained their licences on 22 March 1988 and soon resumed publication, however Watan never fully recovered and shut down permanently in 1996. In the aftermath of the crackdown on newspapers and a subsequent legislation on press activity, editorials of newspaper started to self-censor and became cautious about the stories they ran. According to journalists working during that period, newspapers were also advised by the Home Ministry to avoid certain issues, and editors were called for briefings with various ministries on the way a subject should be covered. The Star itself, after its return, never regained its previous 'liberal flavour'.

The Printing Presses and Publications Act was amended to make printers and publishers re-apply for their licences annually, and established an ouster clause preventing any revocation of license by the Home Affairs Minister from being called into question by the courts. A new criminal offence of "maliciously publishing false news" which carries a three-year jail sentence and/or fines was also added. The Act was subsequently amended in 2012 to remove the requirement for annual licence application and the government's 'absolute discretion' over permits, and reinstated judicial overview.

=== Amendments to the Police Act ===
Amendments were also made to the Police Act to restrict right to free assembly by making a police permit mandatory for public gatherings. It required that any assembly of more than five people in a public area to obtain a police permit 14 days before the assembly. The law also prohibited public rallies for electoral campaigns, and only allowed ceramah (public lecture) by the political parties which would also require a permit. It made it practically impossible to hold any political meeting, including a party's annual general meeting, without a police permit. A conviction could mean a fine of RM10,000 and a jail term of one year.

According to Mahathir, the amendments to the Police Act and the Printing Presses and Publications Act were aimed at individuals and groups who abused the government's liberal attitudes: "Being liberal to them is like offering a flower to a monkey. The monkey would rather tear the flower apart than appreciate its beauty".

== Significance and assessment ==
Operation Lalang is a major event in Mahathir's administration that had a strong impact on civil liberties in Malaysia, and it was seen as an excuse by the Mahathir government to tighten the executive hold by restricting fundamental liberties. To the opposition parties, Operation Lalang came to symbolise 'injustice' and government 'oppression'. The first prime minister of Malaysia, Tunku Abdul Rahman, commenting on Operation Lalang, said: "We are on the road to dictatorship. I cannot see any other way... This is no democracy." The operation is seen as the beginning of Mahathir's authoritarian rule which continued with the sacking of Supreme Court judges in the 1988 Malaysian constitutional crisis the following year.

Although Operation Lalang was ostensibly undertaken for reason of national security, it is also widely seen by commentators as a show of force by Mahathir against his political challengers. The operation created considerable fear inside and outside UMNO. Lim Kit Siang, one of the detainees, similarly argued that the ISA arrests were more directed against UMNO rather than the racial crisis, and that Mahathir allowed the situation to escalate so he could then crack down and consolidate his position against his internal rivals.

Dr Mahathir later expressed regret in his memoir about the severity of Operation Lalang, but suggested that it was the result of a recommendation of strong action by the police. He said that the government response had probably been "excessive and disproportionate", and that the operation was a "permanent blot on my time in office" and "a black mark in the administrative history of Malaysia". But, he added, "I had to suppress my own personal doubts and feelings. I had to recognize the role and expertise of the police and defer to their exercising their appointed role in our system of government."

== Notable detainees ==
- Ibrahim Ali (UMNO MP for Pasir Mas)
- Halim Arshat (PAS youth chief)
- Chan Kit Chee (MCA Perak chief)
- Chee Heng Leng (Rights activist)
- Mohd Nasir Hashim (INSAN chairman)
- Mohammad Fahmi Ibrahim (UMNO youth education chairman)
- Hu Sepang (DAP MP for Rasah)
- Kua Kia Soong (Rights activist)
- Lau Dak Kee (DAP MP for Pasir Pinji)
- Lim Fong Seng (Dong Jiao Zong chairman)
- Lim Guan Eng (DAP MP for Kota Melaka)
- Lim Kit Siang (DAP secretary general)
- Chandra Muzaffar (Aliran chairman)
- Cecelia Ng (INSAN co-founder)
- Harrison Ngau (Friends of the Earth Malaysia representative)
- P. Patto (DAP MP for Ipoh)
- Mohamad Sabu (PAS youth chief)
- Karpal Singh (DAP deputy chairman)
- Tan Chai Ho (MCA)
- Tang See Hang (MCA, Rawang)
- Tan Seng Giaw (DAP MP for Kepong)
- Tuang Pik King (Rights activist)
- Meenakshi Raman (Social activist)
- V. David (DAP MP for Puchong)
- Irene Xavier (Rights activist)
- Yap Pian Hon (MCA youth chairman)

== See also ==
- 2014 Malaysian sedition dragnet
- Operation Coldstore
