= Tuang Pik King =

Malaysian civil and social activist

- Born: Tuang Pik King; Perak, Federation of Malaya (now Malaysia)
- Occupation(s): Social Activist; Educator

Tuang Pik King is a Malaysian civil and minority rights activist and educator from Perak who was detained in the Kamunting Detention Centre Prison during Operation Lalang in the late 1980s along with Mohamad Sabu, Lim Kit Siang, Lim Guan Eng, Kua Kia Soong, Karpal Singh, Mohd Nasir Hashim, and many more people. Operation Lalang was part of the Malaysian government's crackdown on opposition and dissenting voices at the time.
