= 2009 anti-ISA rally =

2009 rally in Kuala Lumpur

The Anti-ISA Rally, also known as the MANSUH Rally, was a demonstration held on 1 August 2009 in Kuala Lumpur, Malaysia, organised by the Abolish ISA Movement (GMI). The rally called for the abolition of the Internal Security Act (ISA), the release of detainees and the closure of the Kamunting detention camp. Demonstrators planned to march to Istana Negara to submit a memorandum to the Yang di-Pertuan Agong, Tuanku Mizan Zainal Abidin.

The demonstration coincided with a planned pro-ISA gathering organised by the Majlis Permuafakatan Ummah (Pewaris) and other organisations. Police did not issue permits for the planned gatherings, citing concerns about possible clashes. On the day of the rally, police dispersed demonstrators using tear gas and water cannons and detained hundreds of participants.

== Background ==
The Internal Security Act 1960 was a Malaysian preventive detention law that permitted detention without trial under specified circumstances. Its use became controversial among opposition parties, lawyers and human rights organisations, which argued that the law restricted civil liberties and allowed detention without adequate judicial oversight. The Abolish ISA Movement (GMI) campaigned for the repeal of the act and the release of detainees held under it. In April 2008, GMI and the Malaysian Bar's Human Rights Committee presented a joint memorandum calling for the abolition of the ISA and other preventive detention laws.

GMI organised the 1 August demonstration under the leadership of its chairman, Syed Ibrahim Syed Noh. The movement formally announced the planned rally in June 2009, with the intention of mobilising a large crowd to demand the repeal of the ISA.

The organisers initially aimed to gather approximately 100,000 people at several locations in Kuala Lumpur, including Masjid Jamek, the Sogo shopping complex and the National Mosque, before marching to Istana Negara to submit a memorandum to the Yang di-Pertuan Agong. The rally had been postponed several times and received support from Pakatan Rakyat and non-governmental organisations concerned with human rights. Student organisations also expressed support for the demonstration.

GMI's demands included the abolition of the ISA, the release of detainees held under the act and the closure of the Kamunting detention camp in Taiping. Participants were expected to assemble at several locations, including Sogo, Masjid Jamek and KL Sentral, before proceeding towards Istana Negara.

== Pro-ISA rally ==
On 22 July 2009, Pewaris and ten Malay non-governmental organisations announced plans to hold a procession on 1 August. The proposed route ran from Central Market to Merdeka Square and then to Istana Negara. The organisers supported retaining the ISA, in contrast to GMI's demand for its abolition.

The planned gathering at Central Market was scheduled to begin at 11:30 am under the theme "1Malaysia, Save Malaysia, Retain the ISA and Defend the Special Rights of the Malays". Approximately 3,000 participants were expected to gather before proceeding to Merdeka Square, where they planned to sign a petition on a banner measuring 200 feet in length and submit a memorandum to the Yang di-Pertuan Agong.

GMI chairman Syed Ibrahim Syed Noh urged the pro-ISA group to use a different route or hold its demonstration on another date to avoid a confrontation between the two groups.

Pewaris's second deputy president was Rahimuddin Md Harun. Other organisations supporting the retention of the ISA included the Pertubuhan Kebajikan dan Dakwah Islamiah Malaysia (Pekida) and the Gabungan Graduan Melayu Muda (GGMM).

== Police response and arrests ==
On 28 July 2009, Kuala Lumpur police chief Datuk Muhammad Sabtu Osman announced that police permits had not been issued for either gathering because of concerns that the groups might encounter one another and create tensions. Police planned to establish roadblocks and warned that organisers and individuals suspected of involvement could be arrested. The planned gatherings were considered by police to contravene Section 27(5) of the Police Act 1967 because permission had not been granted.

On 1 August, thousands of people gathered at locations including Masjid Jamek, the National Mosque, Jalan Tuanku Abdul Rahman, the Sogo shopping complex and the PAS headquarters on Jalan Raja Laut. Participants included People's Justice Party (PKR) adviser Anwar Ibrahim and Democratic Action Party (DAP) adviser Lim Kit Siang. Contemporary reports estimated the anti-ISA crowd at approximately 15,000 to 20,000 people, although estimates varied between reports.

Police, including the Federal Reserve Unit (FRU), dispersed demonstrators using tear gas and water cannons at several locations in central Kuala Lumpur, including the Sogo shopping complex and the area around Masjid Jamek. Police also established roadblocks and closed roads leading to parts of the city centre. GMI was unable to deliver its memorandum directly to the Yang di-Pertuan Agong during the demonstration.

The pro-ISA procession was also disrupted. Pewaris cancelled its planned march to Istana Negara and indicated that representatives would submit a memorandum supporting the ISA. Reports differed over whether the memorandum was formally delivered to the palace. Malaysiakini reported that pro-ISA representative Mohd Khairul Azam Abdul Aziz had handed the memorandum to a palace guard, while a subsequent report in mStar quoted police denying that the memorandum had been formally submitted to Istana Negara.

Mohd Khairul Azam, legal adviser to the Majlis Gabungan Badan Bukan Kerajaan Pembela Negara (Magaran), was reported to have been arrested at approximately 7 pm after approaching the gates of Istana Negara to submit a memorandum calling for the retention of the ISA.

Police reported detaining a total of 589 people, including 44 juveniles, during the demonstration. The Malaysian Bar also reported that 589 people had been arrested and described efforts by volunteer lawyers to monitor arrests and provide legal assistance during remand hearings and bail applications. According to the Bar, 18 people were remanded after hearings on 2 August, while others were released without remand orders.

The arrests and the use of tear gas and water cannons drew criticism from opposition politicians and human rights campaigners. Critics questioned the use of force against demonstrators, while the government defended the police response on security grounds.

== Legal proceedings ==
On 3 August 2009, 29 people were brought before the Kuala Lumpur Sessions Court following the arrests. According to the Malaysian Bar, 16 were charged in connection with participation in an unauthorised assembly, while another 13 faced charges relating to the distribution of T-shirts for an unregistered society, GMI. The court granted bail to those charged with participating in the assembly and to those accused in connection with the T-shirts.

On 4 September 2009, 13 GMI supporters maintained their pleas of not guilty at the Kuala Lumpur Sessions Court to an alternative charge of attempting to participate in an unauthorised assembly under Section 27(5)(a) of the Police Act 1967. The provision carried a penalty of up to six months' imprisonment and a fine of up to RM10,000 upon conviction.

The 13 individuals had originally been accused of supplying six long-sleeved red T-shirts for use at the demonstration on 1 August along Jalan Kinabalu, near the National Mosque. The original charge was reported to carry a penalty of up to three years' imprisonment and a fine of up to RM3,000.

In a separate case involving 16 people arrested during the demonstration, the Kuala Lumpur Sessions Court found the defendants guilty of participating in an unlawful assembly on 22 February 2012. Eleven defendants who were present were sentenced to one day's imprisonment and fined RM2,000 each. The court deferred sentencing for five others who were absent, and they were sentenced on 21 March 2012 to one day's imprisonment and a RM2,000 fine each. The defendants were granted stays of execution of their prison sentences pending appeal.

== Aftermath ==
On 15 September 2011, Prime Minister Najib Razak announced that the government would repeal the Internal Security Act and introduce replacement legislation. The announcement formed part of a wider set of proposed legal and political reforms, although the government rejected claims that the decision was solely the result of opposition or civil-society campaigns.

The ISA was subsequently repealed and replaced by the Security Offences (Special Measures) Act 2012.

== See also ==
- Human rights in Malaysia
- Internal Security Act 1960
- 2011 Bersih 2.0 rally
