= Irene Xavier =

Malaysian activist

Irene Xavier is a Malaysian women's rights activist. She is a prominent member of Friends of Women, Selangor - Persatuan Sahabat Wanita, Selangor (PSWS), a women's rights NGO. She is also a key activist of Suaram, Malaysia's leading human rights organisation.

Irene was one of the 106 people detained under the Internal Security Act (Malaysia) in 1987 during Operation Lalang. As the Internal Security Act is often used to silence dissent, Irene was targeted because of her work as a women's rights activist. In the first 60 days of incommunicado detention, she claimed that she was beaten, humiliated and mentally abused.
