= Shatiri Mansor =

Malaysian politician

Member of the Selangor State Legislative Assembly for Kota Damansara
- In office 9 May 2018 – 12 August 2023
- Preceded by: Halimaton Saadiah Bohan (BN–UMNO)
- Succeeded by: Muhammad Izuan Ahmad Kasim (PH–PKR)
- Majority: 15,703 (2018)

Personal details
- Born: 27 April 1963 (age 63)
- Party: People's Justice Party (PKR)
- Other political affiliations: Pakatan Harapan (PH)
- Education: Wichita State University (Science Engineering Degree (Aeronautics))
- Occupation: Politician

Shatiri bin Mansor is a Malaysian politician who has served as Member of the Selangor State Legislative Assembly (MLA) for Kota Damansara from May 2018 to August 2023. He is a member of the People's Justice Party (PKR), a component party of the Pakatan Harapan (PH).

== Election results ==
Selangor State Legislative Assembly
Year	Constituency	Candidate	Votes	Pct	Opponent(s)	Votes	Pct	Ballots cast	Majority	Turnout
2018	N39 Kota Damansara	Shatiri Mansor (PKR)	26,440	61.14%	Halimaton Saadiah Bohan (UMNO)	10,737	24.83%	43,767	15,703	86.77%
2018	N39 Kota Damansara	Shatiri Mansor (PKR)	26,440	61.14%	Siti Rohaya Ahad (PAS)	5,633	13.03%	43,767	15,703	86.77%
2018	N39 Kota Damansara	Shatiri Mansor (PKR)	26,440	61.14%	Sivarajan Arumugam (PSM)	435	1.01%	43,767	15,703	86.77%
