= Mohd Nasir Hashim =

Malaysian politician

- محمد ناصر هشيم
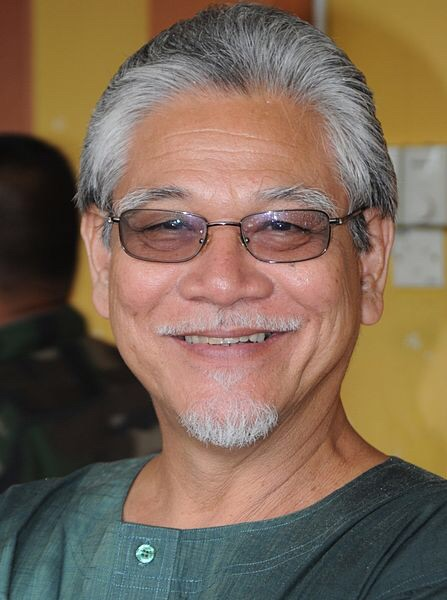

Chairman of the Socialist Party of Malaysia (PSM)
- In office 17 June 2008 – 13 July 2019
- Preceded by: Position established
- Succeeded by: Michael Jeyakumar Devaraj

Member of the Selangor State Assembly for Kota Damansara
- In office 8 March 2008 – 5 May 2013
- Preceded by: Mokhtar Ahmad Dahalan
- Succeeded by: Halimaton Saadiah Bohan
- Majority: 1065 (2008)

Personal details
- Born: Mohd Nasir bin Hashim; 1946 (age 79–80) Malacca, Malayan Union (now Malaysia)
- Party: Socialist Party of Malaysia (PSM) (1998–present); Malaysian People's Party (PRM) (until 1989)
- Education: Royal Military College
- Alma mater: Monmouth College (BSc); Cornell University (MSc, PhD)
- Occupation: Politician
- Profession: Acupuncturist

Mohd Nasir bin Hashim (Jawi: محمد ناصر بن هشيم; born 1947) is a Malaysian democratic socialist politician and former president of the Socialist Party of Malaysia (PSM). He was also the State Assemblyman for Kota Damansara in Selangor from 2008 to 2013. He is a former Chairman of INSAN and Social Research Institute.

== Education ==
Mohd Nasir completed his secondary education at Royal Military College. As a student he also pursued boxing and was also a chess champion.

He obtained Bachelor of Science (BSc) in Biology from the Monmouth College, Master of Science (MSc) in Food Science and Technology and Doctor of Philosophy (PhD) in International Nutrition from Cornell University.

== Political career ==
Mohd Nasir left the traditionally socialist Malaysian People's Socialist Party (Parti Sosialis Rakyat Malaysia; PSRM) after its name reversion to PRM by the party's congress and the new leadership of Syed Husin Ali elected in 1989.

He led a small dissident group to form Parti Sosialis Malaysia in 1998, although its registration was only approved in 2008 after a 10-year battle.

He contested in three elections, winning the Kota Damansara Selangor state assembly seat in 2008, serving a single 5-year term.

In 2019, he stepped down after more than 20 years as party leader.

== Operation Lalang ==
Mohd Nasir was arrested and detained without trial under the Internal Security Act 1960 (ISA) for 15 months at the Kamunting Detention Centre during Operation Lalang, a government-sponsored crackdown that saw the arrest of many people, including activists, intellectuals and opposition politicians in 1987.

== Election results ==
Parliament of Malaysia
| Year | Constituency | Candidate | Votes | Pct | Opponent(s) | Votes | Pct | Ballots cast | Majority | Turnout |
|---|---|---|---|---|---|---|---|---|---|---|
| 2004 | P107 Subang | Mohd Nasir Hashim (PKR)^{1} | 17,481 | 34.67% | Karnail Singh Nijhar (MIC) | 32,941 | 65.33% | 52,017 | 15,460 | 75.67% |

Selangor State Legislative Assembly
| Year | Constituency | Candidate | Votes | Pct | Opponent(s) | Votes | Pct | Ballots cast | Majority | Turnout |
|---|---|---|---|---|---|---|---|---|---|---|
| 2008 | N39 Kota Damansara | Mohd Nasir Hashim (PKR)^{2} | 11,846 | 50.27% | Zein Isma Ismail (UMNO) | 10,771 | 45.71% | 23,566 | 1,075 | 79.34% |
| 2013 | N39 Kota Damansara | Mohd Nasir Hashim (PKR)^{3} | 14,860 | 37.21% | Halimaton Saadiah Bohan (UMNO) | 16,387 | 41.03% | 39,938 | 304 | 61.34% |
| 2013 | N39 Kota Damansara | Mohd Nasir Hashim (PKR)^{3} | 14,860 | 37.21% | Ridzuan Ismail (PAS) | 7,312 | 18.31% | 39,938 | 304 | 61.34% |
| 2013 | N39 Kota Damansara | Mohd Nasir Hashim (PKR)^{3} | 14,860 | 37.21% | Halmi Omar (IND) | 116 | 0.29% | 39,938 | 304 | 61.34% |
| 2013 | N39 Kota Damansara | Mohd Nasir Hashim (PKR)^{3} | 14,860 | 37.21% | Edros Abdullah (IND) | 57 | 0.14% | 39,938 | 304 | 61.34% |
| 2013 | N39 Kota Damansara | Mohd Nasir Hashim (PKR)^{3} | 14,860 | 37.21% | Suppiah Anandan (IND) | 39 | 0.10% | 39,938 | 304 | 61.34% |

Note: ^{1} ^{2} ^{3} Mohd Nasir Hashim while a member of PSM contested under the PKR ticket in the 2004, 2008 and 2013 elections.
