= Ivy Josiah =

Malaysian activist

- Born: 1954 or 1955 (age 71–72); Kuala Lumpur, Malaysia
- Occupations: Teacher, activist
- Employer: Women's Aid Organisation

Ivy Nallammah Josiah (born 1954 or 1955 in Kuala Lumpur) is a teacher and women's rights activist in Malaysia. She has been a pioneer in setting up the Women's Aid Organisation that provides help and refuge to women fleeing from domestic violence in Malaysia.

== Early life ==
Josiah was born in Kuala Lumpur and grew up in Brickfields. Her parents were originally from Jaffna in Sri Lanka but her father came to Malaysia to work for the colonial government. Eventually, Josiah's father returned home to Jaffna, married Josiah's mother and moved back to Malaysia.

== Career ==
For more than 15 years, Josiah was Executive Director of the Women's Aid Organisation (WAO), a Malaysian organisation which helps abused women and children. Through her contributions, Josiah has been described as helping to "put domestic violence on the national agenda". When Josiah started working with WAO, she saw it as a way to eliminate discrimination in her own life saying, "I never saw it as charity work. It's activism." She was introduced to WAO through Datuk Ambiga Sreenevasan, a lawyer and human rights advocate who was her friend in Convent Bukit Nanas.

In 2004 and 2005, she served on the Royal Commission to Enhance the Operation and Management of the Royal Malaysia Police and criticised the Emergency Ordinance.

In 2017, Josiah was still active in many types of civil and political rights causes including volunteering with Bersih, the Human Rights Society of Malaysia, and PROHAM (Society for the Promotion of Human Rights), for whom she is the secretary-general.

== Personal life ==
In 2016, Josiah was also planning on embarking on a creative project with Five Arts Centre founder Marion D'Cruz, a dancer and choreographer, and Mac Chan, a lighting designer. In 2020, she was tipped for an appointment to the Dewan Negara, but this was scuppered by the Sheraton Move which led to the collapse of the incumbent government.
