= Sepang (disambiguation) =

Sepang is a small border town and in Sepang District, Selangor, Malaysia.

Sepang may also refer to:

- Sepang District, Malaysia
- Sepang (federal constituency), Malaysia, represented in the Dewan Rakyat
- Hu Sepang (1947-2020), a former Malaysian politician and political detainee
- Sepang International Circuit, motorsport race track in Sepang, Malaysia
