= Occupy Dataran =

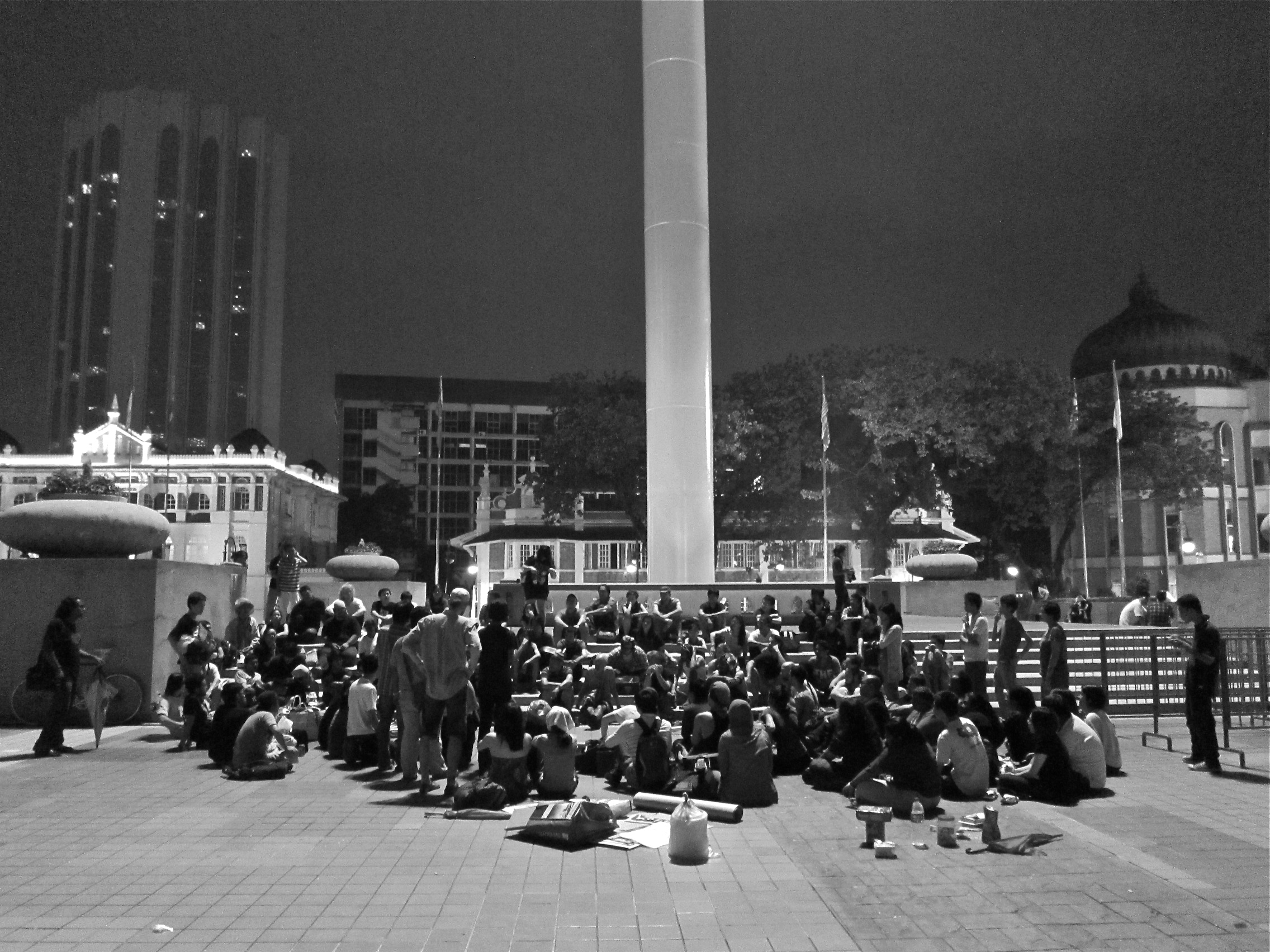
Occupy Dataran assembly on the 15 October 2011 global protests

Occupy Dataran was an autonomous grassroots movement based in Kuala Lumpur, that aims to create a platform to experiment participatory democracy based on the popular assembly model. The Malaysian Insider reported that Occupy Dataran was an offshoot of Occupy Wall Street. The online news portal also reported that the Malaysian protesters were expressing solidarity with the New York protest movement as part of the 15 October 2011 global protests. However, it is widely acknowledged that the first Occupy Dataran assembly was held on 30 July 2011, seven weeks before Occupy Wall Street.

The movement says that it aims to "redefine democratic participation beyond representative democracy, and imagine a new political culture beyond race, ideology and political affiliation". Besides this, it is also for people to get together, hang out, organize activities & spend the night at Dataran Merdeka. Participants of Occupy Dataran gathered every Saturday from 8pm - 6am at Dataran Merdeka. Part of Occupy Dataran is the "KL People's Assembly" where participants gather to share ideas, address problems, explore alternatives, propose solutions and make decisions. It is also open to other activities.

Since October 2011, the movement had spread to Penang with Occupy Penang and other new occupations in Kota Bharu, Johor Bahru, Shah Alam, Petaling Jaya, Dungun and Batu Pahat.

As of June 2012, Occupy Dataran had continued to engage in organized meetings, events and actions.

== Background ==
Occupy Dataran started on July 30, 2011, with a group of people who were inspired by the 15-M Movement and the 2011 Spanish protests. The first Occupy Dataran was planned to coincide with the EO6 overnight vigil organised by civil society groups, which was later canceled due to the release of the EO6. Nevertheless, Occupy Dataran continued.

The following Saturday, August 6, the first official KL People’s Assembly took place. The procedures and basic structures were discussed and agreed upon based on a collective agreement or consensus. Some rules include that the Assembly would be structured in a horizontal and non-hierarchical manner without a leader or governing body, a weekly rotation of assembly moderators and that each vote is equal and everyone’s voice is heard.

== KL People's Assembly ==
According to the official Facebook page, the KL People's Assembly aims to be "an open, egalitarian and democratic platform for people to share ideas, address problems, explore alternatives, propose solutions and make decisions on any issues collectively through consensus decision-making and direct participatory democratic processes". It starts from 8pm to 11pm, every Saturday.

The Assembly is structured in a horizontal and non-hierarchical manner with no leader or governing council. All members of the Assembly have equal standing and rights. The procedures, processes and ground rules were discussed and agreed upon collectively by the Assembly during their first meeting on 6 August 2011 based on a Consensus decision-making process.

The Assembly is facilitated by a moderator that is weekly rotated. Other roles that are weekly rotated are minute-takers, time-keepers, photo documenters and info person. Every member of the Assembly is free to express an opinion or propose an idea to be discussed and voted upon during Assembly.

=== Topics & Discussions ===
The Assembly usually begins by accepting topic proposals from members for discussion or debate. Topics that are voted and passed by everyone will set the agenda for an Assembly. Members take turns to speak by raising their hands and getting speaking approval from the moderator. If the discussion for a topic exceeds the allotted 20 minutes, the Assembly would then decide whether the topic should be extended for another 10 minutes or moved to a working group. Everyone is invited to join the working group which will meet outside of the Assembly period. The findings from the working group will be presented at the next Assembly to be debated. They avoid using delegates or representatives to make decisions for the Assembly. The final decision rests with the Assembly. The allotted 20 minutes per topic allows participants to discuss, debate and come up with proposals to be voted on.

=== Voting ===
The Assembly makes decisions through consensus to ensure that all opinions, ideas and concerns are taken into account before committing to a collective decision that work for everyone. Voting is done through the show of hand signals. Currently, a proposal is passed when there are no blocks from the Assembly during voting. Members who block a proposal are required to provide a justification.

=== Hand Signals ===
Hand signals are used to express opinions during deliberation and to vote. This silent expression is used to avoid shouting and disrupting a speaker.

=== Decisions ===
After a proposal is passed by consensus, the Assembly will form a working group to implement the decision and carry out the task of planning for action. Some decisions that have been turned into action includes the "I love Capitalism Film Week", the Occupy Parlimen protests to oppose the Peaceful Assembly Bill and the Shangri-La street theatre protest.

== Other Activities ==
Besides the KL People's Assembly, Occupy Dataran is also an open platform for people to run activities or hang out. Activities usually commence after the Assembly has ended. Previous activities include workshops, games, potluck picnics, music performances, poetry reading and more.

== 15 October Assembly ==
As part of the 15 October 2011 global protests, Occupy Dataran held a 12-hour program at Dataran Merdeka on the same day starting from 4:00pm. Over 200 people attended 15 October's Occupy Dataran, the largest since it started.

The following morning, The Malaysian Insider reported that Occupy Dataran is an offshoot of Occupy Wall Street. However, the first Occupy Dataran assembly was held on 30 July 2011, one and a half months before the first Occupy Wall Street assembly.

== V for Merdeka Flash Mob Protest on New Year's Eve ==
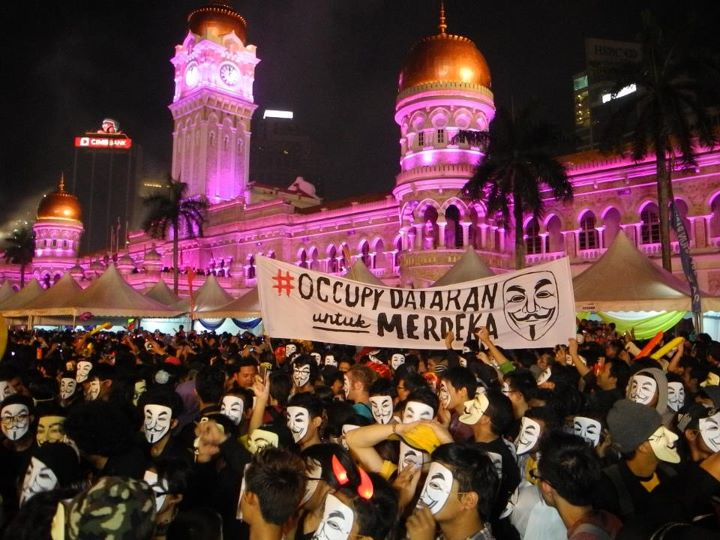
Protestors wear Guy Fawkes mask during the flash mob

On New Year's Eve, 200 people participated in a "V for Merdeka" flash mob protest at Dataran Merdeka organized by Occupy Dataran wearing the Guy Fawkes mask, a symbol of popular resistance that have appeared in many Occupy protests around the world. They were protesting against the Peaceful Assembly Bill, a piece of legislation enacted by the Malaysian government that bans street demonstrations and against the injustices that they saw happened in Malaysia throughout 2011.

== See also ==
Occupy articles

- List of global Occupy movement protest locations
- "Occupy" protests
- Timeline of Occupy Wall Street
- We are the 99%

Related articles

- 15 October 2011 global protests
- 2011 Spanish protests
- Consensus decision-making
- Direct democracy
- Participatory democracy
- Popular Assembly
