= Hu Sepang =

Malaysian politician (1947–2020)

Hu Sepang (1947 - July 3, 2020) was a Malaysian politician and political detainee. He represented the opposition Democratic Action Party, serving terms as state assemblyman and also a single term as Rasah MP.

He was also known for several highly publicised incidents during his career, which included campaigning on horseback.

== Biography ==
Born in 1947, Hu studied political science in Perth, Australia. He joined the DAP in 1972 and became a stalwart of Negeri Sembilan DAP politics.

He was elected to the Negeri Sembilan state legislature in Sungei Ujong (1978–1982), Rahang (1982–1986) and Mambau (1986–1990). He was also voted in as Rasah MP for the 1986 to 1990 term.

Hu said that while recognising that his job was serious and involved debating important issues, he tried to do it with humour.

Among the many incidents he was known for was sitting in front of a bulldozer that was about to demolish a makeshift food stall in 1978 and wearing a Stetson hat to parliament after finding a loophole in its dress code.

He was also once ejected from the Dewan Rakyat during a debate over the OSA (Official Secrets Act) during which he brandished a National Union of Journalists leaflet at the speaker.

In 1987 when he was both Mambau assemblyman and Rasah MP, he was detained in Operation Lalang. It was a major crackdown undertaken by the Royal Malaysian Police from 27 October to 20 November 1987, ostensibly to prevent the occurrence of racial riots in Malaysia.

The operation saw the arrest of at least 106 political activists, opposition politicians, intellectuals, students, artists, scientists and others who were detained without trial under the Internal Security Act (ISA).

In 1990 when contesting the Bukit Pelanduk state seat, a supporter loaned him a retired racehorse to use for his campaign, and he famously fell when the horse was alarmed by the revving motorcycle engines of his supporters.

He was defeated in 1990 and was one of many well-known DAP MPs like Lee Lam Thye, Kua Kia Soong, Fan Yew Teng and Wee Choo Keong, who left the party after clashing with heavyweight Lim Kit Siang.

In his last years, Hu suffered from diabetes which resulted in the amputation of both legs in 2015.

In 2020, he suffered a heart attack at his home and died, leaving behind his wife Judy, three sons and six grandchildren.
