= May 13: Declassified Documents on the Malaysian Riots of 1969 =

2007 book by Kua Kia Soong

- Author: Kua Kia Soong
- Language: English
- Subject: 13 May Incident
- Genre: Non-fiction
- Publication date: 2007

May 13: Declassified Documents on the Malaysian Riots of 1969 is a book published in 2007 and written by activist and scholar Dr. Kua Kia Soong on the 13 May Incident of 1969. It was published by the human rights group Suaram on the 38th anniversary of the worst racial riot in Malaysian history, which took place mostly in Kuala Lumpur. The official death toll was 196, but independent reporters and other observers estimated up to ten times as many people had died. Three quarters of the casualties were Chinese Malaysians, and 6000 of them were left homeless after fires.

As the title suggests, the book is based on declassified documents, which have become available at the Public Record Office, London after the lapse of the 30-year secrecy rule. These documents provide the only available confidential observations and memoranda by British and other foreign embassy operatives based on their intelligence and contacts with local officials and politicians. They include dispatches by correspondents which were then banned in Malaysia. The local media were suspended at the time and local documents remain classified under the Official Secrets Act.

The book challenges the Malaysian government's official position on the cause of the 13 May Incident. At the time, the government stated the cause was opposition parties' creating tensions after the 1969 elections. In contrast, Kua stated that the "ascendant state capitalist class" in the United Malays National Organisation (UMNO), the party in power, had intentionally started the riot, backed by the police and army, as a coup d'etat to topple the Prime Minister Tunku Abdul Rahman to implement the new Malay Agenda.

Due to the book's charges, numerous politicians called for it to be banned. The Internal Security Ministry seized 10 copies from a major bookstore in Kuala Lumpur several days after the release of the book. Malaysian Prime Minister Abdullah Badawi later indicated that the government did not plan to ban the book.
