= Petaling Jaya (federal constituency) =

Federal constituency of Selangor, Malaysia

Petaling Jaya (P105)
Selangor constituency

Federal constituency
- Legislature: Dewan Rakyat
- MP: Vacant
- Constituency created: 1984
- Constituency abolished: 1995
- Constituency re-created: 2018
- First contested: 1986
- Last contested: 2022

Demographics
- Population (2020): 362,290
- Electors (2023): 196,588
- Area (km²): 55
- Pop. density (per km²): 6,587.1

Petaling Jaya is a federal constituency in Petaling District, Selangor, Malaysia, that was represented in the Dewan Rakyat from 1986 to 1995 and 2018 to present.

The federal constituency was created in the 1984 redistribution and is mandated to return a single member to the Dewan Rakyat under the first past the post voting system.

== Demographics ==
Ethnic breakdown of Petaling Jaya's electorate as of 2022
1. Malay (46.3%)
2. Chinese (29.5%)
3. Indian (20.7%)
4. Other ethnicities (3.50%)
Age breakdown of Petaling Jaya's electorate as of 2022
1. 18-20 (5.17%)
2. 21-29 (17.6%)
3. 30-39 (19.7%)
4. 40-49 (18.0%)
5. 50-59 (16.2%)
6. 60-69 (13.2%)
7. 70-79 (6.98%)
8. 80-89 (2.47%)
9. above 90 (0.60%)
Gender breakdown of Petaling Jaya's electorate as of 2022
1. Male (49.4%)
2. Female (50.6%)

== History ==
It was abolished in 1995 when it was redistributed but re-created in 2018 redelineation exercise.

=== Polling districts ===
According to the federal gazette issued on 18 July 2023, the Petaling Jaya constituency is divided into 44 polling districts.

State constituency	Polling Districts	Code	Location
Seri Setia (N32)	Glenmarie	105/32/01	Politeknik Sultan Salahuddin Abdul Aziz Shah
Seri Setia (N32)	SS 6	105/32/02	SK Kelana Jaya (2)
Seri Setia (N32)	SS 5d	105/32/03	SK Kelana Jaya (1)
Seri Setia (N32)	SS 5b & 5c	105/32/04	SK Sri Kelana Jaya
Seri Setia (N32)	SS 5a	105/32/05	Dewan Serbaguna SS 5a/15
Seri Setia (N32)	Seri Setia	105/32/06	SK Sungai Way
Seri Setia (N32)	PJS 5 Kampung Penanga	105/32/07	Balai Raya MBPJ
Seri Setia (N32)	PJS 6/4 - PJS 6/6	105/32/08	SJK (T) Seaport
Seri Setia (N32)	PJS 10/1 - PJS 10/16	105/32/09	SK Kampung Lindungan
Seri Setia (N32)	Rumah Pangsa Sungai Way	105/32/10	SK Sungai Way
Seri Setia (N32)	PJS 5/1 - PJS 5/12	105/32/11	Kolej Tingkatan 6 Petaling Jaya
Seri Setia (N32)	PJS 6/1 - PJS 6/3	105/32/12	Sekolah KAFA Integrasi Al-Islamiah Kampung Lindungan
Seri Setia (N32)	PJS 8	105/32/13	Dewan Seberguna Dato' Hormat
Seri Setia (N32)	PJS 10/17 - PJS 10/34	105/32/14	SK Kampung Lindungan
Seri Setia (N32)	SS 7	105/32/15	Dewan Sri Kelana, Komplek Sukan Kelana Jaya
Seri Setia (N32)	Kampung Lindungan	105/32/16	Dewan Komuniti Jalan PJS 6
Seri Setia (N32)	PJS 5/13 - PJS 5/30	105/32/17	Kolej Tingkatan 6 PJS 5/26 Petaling Jaya
Seri Setia (N32)	Taman TTDI Jaya	105/32/18	SK Taman Tun Dr. Ismail Jaya Shah Alam
Seri Setia (N32)	Ara Damansara	105/32/19	SMK Lembah Subang Kelana Jaya
Seri Setia (N32)	Taman Glenmarie	105/32/20	Politeknik Sultan Salahuddin Abdul Aziz Shah
Taman Medan (N33)	Seksyen 51	105/33/01	SJK (T) Vivekananda Petaling Jaya Taman Templer
Taman Medan (N33)	Seksyen 4 Petaling Jaya	105/33/02	SK Jalan Selangor (1); SK Jalan Selangor (2)
Taman Medan (N33)	Kawasan Melayu	105/33/03	SK Petaling Jaya
Taman Medan (N33)	PJS 1	105/33/04	SJK (C) Yuk Chyun
Taman Medan (N33)	Medan Pejasa	105/33/05	Dewan Masyarakat Taman Sri Manja
Taman Medan (N33)	Taman Dato Harun 1	105/33/06	SRA Taman Datuk Harun
Taman Medan (N33)	Taman Dato Harun 2	105/33/07	SK Taman Dato' Harun (1)
Taman Medan (N33)	PJS 3	105/33/08	Dewan Seberguna Jalan Medan 12
Taman Medan (N33)	PJS 4	105/33/09	SRA Kampung Medan 2
Taman Medan (N33)	Baiduri	105/33/10	SRA Kampung Baiduri
Taman Medan (N33)	Petaling Utama	105/33/11	KAFA Integrasi Kampung Pinang Tunggal
Taman Medan (N33)	PJS 2	105/33/12	SK Taman Medan
Taman Medan (N33)	PJS 2c/12	105/33/13	SMK Taman Dato' Harun
Taman Medan (N33)	PJS 2d	105/33/14	Balai Raya PJS 2d/11 Taman Medan
Taman Medan (N33)	Kampung Medan	105/33/15	SRA Medan Harun
Taman Medan (N33)	PJS 2c	105/33/16	Dewan Seberguna PJS 2c/6
Bukit Gasing (N34)	Seksyen 17 Utara	105/34/01	SK Sri Damai
Bukit Gasing (N34)	Seksyen 17 Barat	105/34/02	SK Sri Damai
Bukit Gasing (N34)	Seksyen 17 Tengah	105/34/03	SK Sri Damai
Bukit Gasing (N34)	Seksyen 17 Selatan	105/34/04	Dewan Al-Malik Faisal (Pusat Asasi UIAM)
Bukit Gasing (N34)	Seksyen 16	105/34/05	SMK Sultan Abdul Samad
Bukit Gasing (N34)	Jalan Bukit	105/34/06	SK Sultan Alam Shah (Satu); SK Sultan Alam Shah (Dua)
Bukit Gasing (N34)	Jalan Semangat	105/34/07	SMK (Laki-Laki) Bukit Bintang Jalan Utara
Bukit Gasing (N34)	Seksyen 5 Utara	105/34/08	SMK La Salle PJ
Bukit Gasing (N34)	Taman Jaya	105/34/09	SMJK Katholik
Bukit Gasing (N34)	Kawasan Assunta Convent	105/34/10	SMK Assunta
Bukit Gasing (N34)	Kawasan Bandar Baharu	105/34/11	SK La Salle PJ
Bukit Gasing (N34)	Jalan Sungai Jernih	106/35/12	SK (L) Bukit Bintang (1); SK (L) Bukit Bintang (2)
Bukit Gasing (N34)	Seksyen Satu Petaling Jaya	105/34/13	SK (1) Jalan 1/10 Petaling Jaya; SK (2) Jalan 1/10 Petaling Jaya
Bukit Gasing (N34)	Kawasan Bangunan K.K.P.L	105/34/14	SMK (P) Taman Petaling
Bukit Gasing (N34)	Seksyen 5 Selatan	105/34/15	SMK (P) Taman Petaling
Bukit Gasing (N34)	Seksyen 17 A	105/34/16	SJK (C) Chung Hwa Damansara
Bukit Gasing (N34)	Seksyen 19	105/34/17	Gelanggang Bola Keranjang, SK Taman Sea
Bukit Gasing (N34)	Seksyen 14 Utara	105/34/18	SK Sri Petaling
Bukit Gasing (N34)	Seksyen 14 Selatan	105/34/19	SMK Sri Utama
Bukit Gasing (N34)	Seksyen 2 Petaling Jaya	105/34/20	SJK (C) Chen Moh

=== Representation history ===
Members of Parliament for Petaling Jaya
Parliament	No	Years	Member	Party	Vote Share
Constituency created from Petaling and Shah Alam
7th	P090	1986–1990	Eng Seng Chai (黄生财)	DAP	29,929; 55.88%
8th	P090	1990–1995	Kua Kia Soong (柯嘉逊)	GR (DAP)	40,685; 62.19%
Constituency abolished, split into Petaling Jaya Utara, Petaling Jaya Selatan and Subang
Constituency re-created from Petaling Jaya Selatan, Kelana Jaya, Subang and Shah Alam
14th	P105	2018	Maria Chin Abdullah (مارية چين عبدالله)	PH (Direct)	78,984; 68.52%
14th	P105	2018–2022	Maria Chin Abdullah (مارية چين عبدالله)	PH (PKR)	78,984; 68.52%
15th	P105	2022–2026	Lee Chean Chung (李健聪)	PH (PKR)	83,311; 57.12%
15th	P105	2026–present	Vacant		

=== State constituency ===
Parliamentary constituency	State constituency						
Parliamentary constituency	1955–59*	1959–1974	1974–1986	1986–1995	1995–2004	2004–2018	2018–present
Petaling Jaya							Bukit Gasing
Petaling Jaya				Damansara Utama			
Petaling Jaya				Kelana Jaya			
Petaling Jaya							Seri Setia
Petaling Jaya				Taman Aman			
Petaling Jaya							Taman Medan

=== Historical boundaries ===
State Constituency	Area	
State Constituency	1984	2018
Bukit Gasing		Jalan Othman; Jalan Templer; Jalan Universiti; Petaling Jaya; Seksyen 1-2, 5-18 Petaling Jaya
Damansara Utama	Bukit Lanjan; Kayu Ara; Seksyen 13, 16 - 17A , 19 - 20 Petaling Jaya; SS2, 4A, 20 - 26; Taman Mayang	
Kelana Jaya	Jalan Majilis; PJS5; Seksyen 51A Petaling Jaya; SS3, 5, 9, 9A; Sungai Way	
Seri Setia		Ara Damansara; Kelana Jaya; PJS5 - 6, 8, 10; SS7 - 9, 10 - 11; U1 - 2 & 7
Taman Aman	Kampung Tunku; Seksyen 14, 20 - 22 Petaling Jaya; SS1; Taman Aman; Taman Paramount	
Taman Medan		Kampung Dato Harun; PJ Old Town; Seksyen 2-4, 14, 51 & 52 Petaling Jaya; PJS1 - 4; Taman Sri Manja

=== Current state assembly members ===
No.	State Constituency	Member	Coalition (Party)
N32	Seri Setia	Mohammad Fahmi Ngah	PH (PKR)
N33	Taman Medan	Afif Bahardin	PN (BERSATU)
N34	Bukit Gasing	Rajiv Rishyakaran	PH (DAP)

=== Local governments & postcodes ===
No.	State Constituency	Local Government	Postcode
N32	Seri Setia	Petaling Jaya City Council; Shah Alam City Council (TTDI Jaya and Glenmarie areas)	40150 Shah Alam; 46000, 46050, 46100, 46150, 46200, 46350, 46400, 47300, 47301, 47308 Petaling Jaya; 58200 Kuala Lumpur
N33	Taman Medan	Petaling Jaya City Council	40150 Shah Alam; 46000, 46050, 46100, 46150, 46200, 46350, 46400, 47300, 47301, 47308 Petaling Jaya; 58200 Kuala Lumpur
N34	Bukit Gasing	Petaling Jaya City Council	40150 Shah Alam; 46000, 46050, 46100, 46150, 46200, 46350, 46400, 47300, 47301, 47308 Petaling Jaya; 58200 Kuala Lumpur

== Election results ==
Malaysian general election, 2022
Party	Candidate	Votes	%	∆%
PH	Lee Chean Chung	83,311	57.12	▲57.12
PN	Theng Book	32,736	22.44	▲22.44
BN	Chew Hian Tat	23,253	15.94	▼3.01
PEJUANG	Mazween Mokhtar	4,052	2.78	▲2.78
Parti Rakyat Malaysia	Mohamad Ezam Mohd Nor	2,049	1.40	▲1.40
Independent	KJ John	461	0.32	▲0.32
Total valid votes		145,862	100.00	
Total rejected ballots		1,664		
Unreturned ballots		495		
Turnout		148,021	74.74	▼8.00
Registered electors		195,148		
Majority		50,575	34.68	▼14.88
PH hold		Swing		
Source(s) https://lom.agc.gov.my/ilims/upload/portal/akta/outputp/1753283/PUB612.pdf

Malaysian general election, 2018
Party	Candidate	Votes	%	∆%
PKR	Maria Chin Abdullah	78,984	68.52	
BN	Chew Hian Tat	21,847	18.95	
PAS	Noraini Hussin	14,448	12.53	
Total valid votes		115,279	100.00	
Total rejected ballots		968		
Unreturned ballots		350		
Turnout		116,597	82.74	
Registered electors		140,920		
Majority		57,137	49.56	
PKR hold		Swing		
Source(s) "His Majesty's Government Gazette - Notice of Contested Election, Parliament for the State of Selangor [P.U. (B) 239/2018]" (PDF). Attorney General's Chambers of Malaysia. 3 May 2018. Archived from the original (PDF) on 19 July 2019. "Federal Government Gazette - Results of Contested Election and Statements of the Poll after the Official Addition of Votes, Parliamentary Constituencies for the State of Selangor [P.U. (B) 313/2018]" (PDF). Attorney General's Chambers of Malaysia. 28 May 2018. Archived from the original (PDF) on 19 July 2019.

Malaysian general election, 1990
Party	Candidate	Votes	%	∆%
DAP	Kua Kia Soong	40,685	62.19	▲6.31
BN	Soh Chee Wen	24,735	37.81	▼1.73
Total valid votes		65,420	100.00	
Total rejected ballots		1,161		
Unreturned ballots		0		
Turnout		66,581	67.68	▲0.07
Registered electors		98,383		
Majority		15,950	24.38	▼27.96
DAP hold		Swing		

Malaysian general election, 1986
Party	Candidate	Votes	%
DAP	Eng Seng Chai	29,929	55.88
BN	Lee Phon Yong	21,176	39.54
SDP	Wong Sai Hou	2,454	4.58
Total valid votes		53,559	100.00
Total rejected ballots		801	
Unreturned ballots		0	
Turnout		54,360	67.61
Registered electors		80,403	
Majority		8,753	52.34
This was a new constituency created.
