= Izuan Kasim =

Malaysian politician (born 1991)

Yang Berhormat Tuan Muhammad Izuan Ahmad Kasim MLA
- محمّد إيزوان أحمد قاسم

Member of the Selangor State Legislative Assembly for Kota Damansara
- Incumbent
- Assumed office 12 August 2023
- Preceded by: Shatiri Mansor (PH–PKR)
- Majority: 5,694 (2023)

Deputy Youth Chief of the People's Justice Party
- Incumbent
- Assumed office 24 May 2025
- President: Anwar Ibrahim
- Youth Chief: Muhammad Kamil Abdul Munim
- Preceded by: Muhammad Kamil Abdul Munim

Personal details
- Born: Muhammad Izuan bin Ahmad Kasim; 18 June 1991 (age 35) Flat Proton, Section 27, Shah Alam, Selangor, Malaysia
- Citizenship: Malaysia
- Party: People's Justice Party (PKR) (since 2013)
- Other political affiliations: Pakatan Rakyat (PR) (2013–2015); Pakatan Harapan (PH) (since 2015)
- Education: Management and Science University (Bachelor's degree in law and commerce) & Universiti Teknologi MARA (Postgraduate diploma in Syariah law and practice)
- Occupation: Politician

Muhammad Izuan bin Ahmad Kasim (born 18 June 1991) is a Malaysian politician who has served as Member of the Selangor State Legislative Assembly (MLA) for Kota Damansara since August 2023. He is a member of the People's Justice Party (PKR), a component party of the Pakatan Harapan (PH) and formerly Pakatan Rakyat (PR) coalitions. He has also served as the State Vice Chairman, Youth Chief of Selangor and Division Youth Chief of Shah Alam since 2022. He served as Member of the Shah Alam City Council (MBSA) from 2012 to 2023, Deputy Chairman and Chairman of Zone 2 of Local Youth Mobiliser of MBSA from 2016 to 2018, Policy Advisor to the MLA for Kota Anggerik Yaakob Sapari, Youth Managing Secretary of PKR and Division Secretary of PKR of Shah Alam from 2014 to 2018 and Young MLA of Selangor in 2016.

== Political career ==
=== Member of the Selangor State Legislative Assembly (since 2023) ===
==== 2023 Selangor state election ====
In the 2023 Selangor state election, Muhammad Izuan made his electoral debut after being nominated by PH to contest the Kota Damansara state seat. Muhammad Izuan won the seat and was elected to the Selangor State Legislative Assembly as the Kota Damansara MLA for the first term after defeating Mohd Radzlan Jalaludin of Perikatan Nasional (PN) and Sivarajan Arumugam of Parti Sosialis Malaysia (PSM) by a majority of 5,694 votes.

As the Kota Damansara MLA, Muhammad Izuan pledged to pay attention on solvable issues and offers he can make to the people. He promised to avoid the race and religion topics in his campaign. He said although he is not a local of Kota Damansara, he never tried to be one. He created a tagline for Kota Damansara in the Malay language, namely 'Kota Damansara, Kota Kita', literally 'Kota Damansara, Our City'. He spared no time to meet the people on the ground. He raised an example he would like to address once he was elected, he would like to search for possible solutions to the issues facing the faulty lifts of the People Housing Project (PPR) flats which were the major concerns of the residents there. He also noted the hardship to manage Kota Damansara as it is located between Subang and Petaling Jaya so he has to engage with both MBSA and Petaling Jaya City Council (MBPJ). He added that he had frequently been directly meeting and engaging with the community to listen to their feedback and bringing forward their feedback to both MBSA and MBPJ. He revealed that areas under MBPJ usually faced issues with infrastructure and traffic congestion. However, issues in the areas under MBSA were more serious, the lack of public schools led children to inconvenience and far distance from their residences to schools. Besides that, he also named the poor Internet connectivity a major issue and sent a report to the Malaysian Communications and Multimedia Commission (MCMC) on the issue. He also made upgrading school facilities his priority for special needs children. For floods, he aimed to implement flood mitigation projects in the flood-prone Kota Damansara like what he did during his tenure as Member of MBSA. In addition, he promoted recycling by rewarding residents who contributed the most recyclable items with shopping vouchers. On his political career, his ambition was to climb the political ladder and rise to be a leader of the national level to serve the people.

== Election results ==
Selangor State Legislative Assembly
Year	Constituency	Candidate	Votes	Pct	Opponent(s)	Votes	Pct	Ballots cast	Majority	Turnout
2023	N39 Kota Damansara	Muhammad Izuan Ahmad Kasim (PKR)	34,628	53.72%	Mohd Radzlan Jalaludin (BERSATU)	28,934	44.89%	64,457	5,694	71.52%
2023	N39 Kota Damansara	Muhammad Izuan Ahmad Kasim (PKR)	34,628	53.72%	Sivarajan Arumugam (PSM)	895	1.39%	64,457	5,694	71.52%
