= Women's Aid Organisation =

Malay refuge for victims of domestic violence

Women's Aid Organisation (WAO) is a Malaysian non-governmental organisation that fights for women's rights and specifically against violence against women. It was founded in 1982 and continues to play a leading role in the Malaysian women's rights movement working within the fields of advocacy, public education as well as law and policy reforms.

WAO is a non-profit organisation that helps homeless and poor women of the Malaysian Joint Action Group (JAG) and within this group it has been involved in the lobby for the Domestic Violence Act in 1994 in Malaysia.

== History ==
In 1979, the late Tan Siew Sin was honoured with the Tun Razak Award for his contribution to the country. He donated his cash award of RM 30,000.00 to establish a shelter for battered women and their children. A pro tem committee headed by Puan Sri E.N. Chong had its first meeting in November 1981. It took nine months to lay the groundwork and to form a core group of volunteers. These pioneer volunteers worked as a collective to formulate the operating principles of self-help and self-empowerment for battered women who turned to WAO for help.

In June 1982, WAO received temporary registration as a society and a single storey house was rented as WAO's refuge and office premises. The Malay Mail published the first article about the planned Refuge and soon after in September 1982 WAO received its first resident at the shelter.

Ivy Josiah was the executive director for over 15 years, and was succeeded in February 2015 by Sumitra Visvanathan, a lawyer and humanitarian aid worker who worked for the United Nations High Commissioner for Refugees (UNHCR) for the previous 16 years. In April 2024, Sumitra resigned claiming that she had been repeatedly suspended without justification, after an interim exco was appointed following the mass resignations of the previous exco in January. In 2025, Nazreen Nizam became the executive director of WAO.

== Belief and Mission ==
WAO's belief is that none deserves to be battered, and that all people have the right to self-determination and should have control over conditions that shape their lives.

WAO aims to "create and promote respect, protection and the fulfillment of equal rights of women and to work towards the elimination of discrimination against women, in particular in the elimination of violence against women".

== Core services and projects ==
WAO consists of three different centres that all fulfill specific tasks.

=== 1. The Refuge ===
The refuge was the first center of WAO and is a house where battered women and their children can find a shelter. In the past years it has also become a shelter for abused migrant workers, trafficked women, asylum seekers and single mothers. There are professional social workers who provide assistance to those women and who also give face-to-face counselling sessions for those who seek counselling but may not want to move into the shelter. There is also professional telephone counselling for women who face domestic violence, rape, sexual abuse and as well for those who have questions on marriage and divorce. The average number of phone calls being handled per year by the social workers is 1,500.

In March 2014, WAO launched the first live SMS helpline, TINA, to support survivors of domestic violence and women in crisis. TINA was launched as part of the WAO's national campaign, #NoExcuseForAbuse to mark International Women's Day on 8 March 2014.

=== 2. The Childcare Centre (CCC) ===
As the first of its kind the CCC was founded in 1990 and since then it created a home for the children of former refuge residents. Those women have decided to live and work independently, but are not yet capable of taking care of their children at the same time. Within the CCC the children receive a home, education and a support system that meets their physical, mental and emotional needs.

=== 3. The WAO Centre ===
This office is mainly responsible for administration, research and advocacy and serves as the public face of the organisation.

== Activities ==
WAO lobbies to influence changes in policy and legislation in Malaysia to support the rights of women.

=== CEDAW ===
In March 2006, WAO in collaboration with the National Council of Women's Organisations, organised a press conference to officially launch the CEDAW (Convention on the Elimination of All Forms of Discrimination against Women) Shadow Report, prepared by a coalition of NGOs. In May 2006, the Malaysian Government was reviewed by the CEDAW Committee, which included three WAO representatives, at the United Nations’ 35th CEDAW session in New York.

=== COMANGO ===
WAO is a member of COMANGO, The Coalition of Malaysian NGOs, which was formed to engage with the Universal Periodic Review, a process of reviewing the human rights of a country established by the UN Human Rights Council in 2006. WAO was also involved in writing the COMANGO report for the Second Cycle of the Universal Periodic Review in 2013.

== Awareness Campaigns ==
WAO has been involved with several notable public awareness campaigns to highlight the issue of domestic violence.

=== #NoExcuseForAbuse ===
WAO launched its national public education campaign #NoExcuseForAbuse on 8 March 2014, to highlight the issue of domestic violence. WAO wanted to challenge ideas that women who have suffered from domestic violence may use to justify the abuse without realising. The campaign aimed to target the early phases of domestic abuse and to reach out to women who were in potentially abusive relationships.

The campaign included the launch of an art exhibition that featured embroidered blouses, hand stitched with the thoughts that represent the voices of victim survivors. Each blouse featured words such as "It’s alright, he apologised. He said he’ll never do it again". The installation art was displayed in various locations in the Klang Valley, East Coast and East Sarawak.

Another part of the campaign encouraged women to upload photos of themselves wearing #NoExcuseForAbuse T-shirts on social media. Notable figures who participated included politicians such as Hajah Nancy Shukri, Minister in the Prime Minister's Department; YB Hannah Yeoh, Selangor Assembly Speaker; YB Nurul Izzah, MP for Lembah Pantai and YB Mas Ermieyati Samsudin, Puteri UMNO Chief.

The third phase of the campaign focused on the launch of the SMS helpline, TINA. TINA is meant to represent a virtual friend, "Think I Need Aid", for victims to reach out to.

=== V-Day: Love Should Be Unconditional ===
To mark Valentine's Day, 2014, WAO distributed roses as part of an awareness campaign to remind people that Love Should be Unconditional. The campaign focused on raising awareness about the Cycle of Abuse, specifically highlighting the behaviour of abusers who apologise, make promises and give gifts following incidents of abuse.

=== 1 Billion Rising ===
In February 2013, WAO partnered with The Body Shop to support 1 Billion Rising, a global campaign organised by V-Day calling for the end of violence against women and to promote gender equality for women worldwide. All The Body Shop stores in West Malaysia held flash mobs outside the stores, with staff members, NGOs and activists participating.

== Public Policy Reform ==
=== #MakeStalkingACrime ===
In the late 2010s, WAO began campaigning to criminalise stalking. The proposed law aimed to protect Malaysian victims of stalking, through amendments to the Panel Code, which would create the offence of stalking, and amendments to the Criminal Procedure Code, which would create protection orders for stalking survivors. The amendments passed in Parliament in March 2023, introducing a new section, Section 507A under the Penal Act (Act 574), which makes stalking an offence punishable by a maximum jail sentence of up to three years, a fine, or both.

=== #7DaysforDads ===
In 2019, WAO launched a campaign focused on providing fathers in the private sector with guaranteed seven days of paternity leave, where previously there were no regulations around the length of leaves new fathers were allowed. The introduction of the seven day paternity leave was included through an amendment to the Employment Act 1955. The amendments passed in 2022, also introducing a longer maternity leave, from 60 days to 98 days.

== See also ==
- Women in Malaysia
