= Kota Damansara (state constituency) =

State constituency in Selangor, Malaysia

Kota Damansara (N39)
Selangor constituency

State constituency
- Legislature: Selangor State Legislative Assembly
MLA
Muhammad Izuan Ahmad Kasim
PH
- Constituency created: 2003
- First contested: 2004
- Last contested: 2023

Demographics
- Electors (2023): 90,130

Kota Damansara is a state constituency in Selangor, Malaysia, that has been represented in the Selangor State Legislative Assembly since 2004. It has been represented by Muhammad Izuan Ahmad Kasim of Pakatan Harapan (PH) since 2023.

The state constituency was created in the 2003, redistribution and is mandated to return a single member to the Selangor State Legislative Assembly under the first past the post voting system.

== Demographics ==
Ethnic breakdown of Kota Damansara's electorate as of 2023
1. Malay (60.5%)
2. Chinese (24.7%)
3. Indian (11.0%)
4. Other ethnicities (3.83%)

== History ==
=== Polling districts ===
According to the gazette issued on 30 March 2018, the Kota Damansara constituency has a total of 17 polling districts.

State constituency	Polling districts	Code	Location
Kota Damansara（N39）	Kampung Baharu Sungai Buloh	107/39/01	SJK (C) Kampung Baharu Sungai Buloh
Kota Damansara（N39）	RRI Sungai Buloh	107/39/02	SJK (T) R.R.I Sungai Buloh
Kota Damansara（N39）	Pinggiran Subang	107/39/03	SK Subang Bestari
Kota Damansara（N39）	Taman Subang Baru	107/39/04	SMK Subang
Kota Damansara（N39）	Kampung Melayu Subang	107/39/05	SRA Islam Kampung Melayu Subang
Kota Damansara（N39）	Subang Perdana	107/39/06	SK Jalan U3
Kota Damansara（N39）	Kota Damansara Seksyen 4 Dan 5	107/39/07	SMK Seksyen 4 Kota Damansara
Kota Damansara（N39）	LTSSAAS Subang	107/39/08	Asia Pacific Schools
Kota Damansara（N39）	Kampung Baharu Subang	107/39/09	SJK (C) Subang
Kota Damansara（N39）	Kota Damansara Seksyen 7	107/39/10	SK Seksyen 7 Kota Damansara
Kota Damansara（N39）	Kampung Baharu Sungai Buloh Dewan	107/39/11	SJK (C) Kampung Baharu Sungai Buloh
Kota Damansara（N39）	Jalan Merbau Kampung Melayu Subang	107/39/12	SK Subang
Kota Damansara（N39）	Mutiara Subang	107/39/13	SMK Subang Bestari
Kota Damansara（N39）	Kota Damansara Seksyen 6	107/39/14	SK Seksyen 6 Kota Damansara
Kota Damansara（N39）	Kota Damansara Seksyen 8 Dan 9	107/39/15	SK Seksyen 9 Kota Damansara
Kota Damansara（N39）	Kota Damansara Seksyen 10 Dan 11	107/39/16	SK Seksyen 11 Kota Damansara
Kota Damansara（N39）	Kem Sungai Buloh	107/39/17	Dewan Serbaguna Kem Sungai Buloh

=== Representation history ===
Members of the Legislative Assembly for Kota Damansara
Assembly	No	Years	Member	Party
Constituency created from Paya Jaras, Kelana Jaya and Bukit Lanjan
11th	N39	2004–2008	Mohd Mokhtar Ahmad Dahlan	BN (UMNO)
12th	N39	2008–2013	Mohd Nasir Hashim	PSM
13th	N39	2013–2018	Halimaton Saadiah Bohan	BN (UMNO)
14th	N39	2018–2023	Shatiri Mansor	PH (PKR)
15th	N39	2023–present	Muhammad Izuan Ahmad Kasim	PH (PKR)

== Election results ==
Selangor state election, 2023
Party	Candidate	Votes	%	∆%
PH	Muhammad Izuan Ahmad Kasim	34,628	53.72	▼7.42
PN	Mohd Radzlan Jalaludin	28,934	44.89	▲44.89
Parti Sosialis Malaysia	Sivarajan Arumugam	895	1.39	▲0.38
Total valid votes		64,457	100.00	
Total rejected ballots		308		
Unreturned ballots		86		
Turnout		64,851	71.95	▼14.82
Registered electors		90,130		
Majority		5,694	8.78	▼27.53
PH hold		Swing		

Selangor state election, 2018
Party	Candidate	Votes	%	∆%
PKR	Shatiri Mansor	26,440	61.14	▲22.81
BN	Halimaton Saadiah Bohan	10,737	24.83	▼17.44
PAS	Siti Rohaya Ahad	5,633	13.03	▼5.83
Parti Sosialis Malaysia	Sivarajan Arumugam	435	1.01	▲1.01
Total valid votes		43,245	100.00	
Total rejected ballots		391		
Unreturned ballots		131		
Turnout		43,767	86.77	▼0.92
Registered electors		50,438		
Majority		15,703	36.31	▲32.37
PKR gain from BN		Swing		?

Selangor state election, 2013
Party	Candidate	Votes	%	∆%
BN	Halimaton Saadiah Bohan	16,387	42.27	▼5.35
PKR	Mohd Nasir Hashim	14,860	38.33	▼14.05
PAS	Ridzuan Ismail	7,312	18.86	▼18.86
Independent	Halmi Omar	116	0.30	▼0.30
Independent	Edros Abdullah	57	0.15	▼0.15
Independent	Suppiah Anandan	39	0.10	▼0.10
Total valid votes		38,771	100.00	
Total rejected ballots		542		
Unreturned ballots		101		
Turnout		39,414	87.69	▲8.35
Registered electors		44,948		
Majority		1,527	3.94	▼0.81
BN gain from PKR		Swing		?
Source(s) "Federal Government Gazette - Notice of Contested Election, State Legislative Assembly for the State of Selangor [P.U. (B) 192/2013]" (PDF). Attorney General's Chambers of Malaysia. 26 April 2013. Archived from the original (PDF) on 2019-12-29. "Federal Government Gazette - Results of Contested Election and Statements of the Poll after the Official Addition of Votes, State Constituencies for the State of Selangor [P.U. (B) 233/2013]" (PDF). Attorney General's Chambers of Malaysia. 22 May 2013. Archived from the original (PDF) on 2018-10-02.

Selangor state election, 2008
Party	Candidate	Votes	%	∆%
PKR	Mohd Nasir Hashim	11,846	52.38	▲52.38
BN	Zein Isma Ismail	10,771	47.62	▼25.19
Total valid votes		22,617	100.00	
Total rejected ballots		603		
Unreturned ballots		346		
Turnout		23,566	79.34	▲1.50
Registered electors		29,701		
Majority		1,075	4.75	▼40.87
PKR gain from BN		Swing		?

Selangor state election, 2004
Party	Candidate	Votes	%
BN	Mohd Mokhtar Ahmad Dahlan	12,926	72.81
PAS	Mohamad Ariff Md Yusof	4,827	27.19
Total valid votes		17,753	100.00
Total rejected ballots		406	
Unreturned ballots		538	
Turnout		18,697	77.84
Registered electors		24,019	
Majority		8,099	45.62
This was a new constituency created.
