= Emergency (Public Order and Crime Prevention) Ordinance, 1969 =

Emergency (Public Order and Prevention of Crime) Ordinance, 1969

National Operations Council
- Long title: An Ordinance promulgated by the Yang di-Pertuan Agong under Article 150 (2) of the Constitution.
- Citation: EMERGLAW69(4)
- Territorial extent: Malaysia
- Enacted by: National Operations Council
- Royal assent: 12 June 1969
- Effective: 16 May 1969
- Member(s) in charge: Abdul Razak Hussein

Keywords
- Public order, crime prevention
- Status: Repealed

The Emergency (Public Order and Crime Prevention) Ordinance, 1969 (Malay: Ordinan Darurat (Ketenteraman Awam dan Mencegah Jenayah), 1969), commonly abbreviated as the Emergency Ordinance (EO), was a Malaysian law whose most well-known provision allows for indefinite detention without trial.

== History ==
The Emergency Ordinance was enacted by the National Operations Council led by Abdul Razak Hussein as part of the state of emergency declared following the 13 May race riots. It had been regularly used to detain those deemed to be subversive by the government, and was in fact used far more frequently than the Internal Security Act. Though figures for those detained under the EO were not released by the government, Human Rights Watch estimated there to be 712 such detainees in 2005.

A recent use of the Emergency Ordinance was in June 2011, to detain indefinitely 6 members of Parti Sosialis Malaysia, including Sungai Siput Member of Parliament Dr. Michael Jeyakumar Devaraj, due to their support for the Bersih 2.0 rally for electoral reform. These 6 people have been collectively called the Emergency Ordinance 6, or EO6. As of July, all 6 remained under detention, and looked likely to remain so for another two years. The first Occupy Dataran was planned to coincided with an EO6 vigil. When the EO6 were released on 29 July, the first official KL People's Assembly meeting was postponed until the following Saturday, 6 August.

The Emergency (Public Order and Crimes Prevention) Ordinance 1969 was repealed in 2013, Putrajaya is now turning to the Prevention of Crime Act 1959 (PCA) to facilitate preventive detention and detention without trial.

== See also ==
- Emergency Ordinance (Malaysia)

== See also ==
- Emergency (Public Order and Crime Prevention) Ordinance 1969
