= Kua Ee Heok =

Singaporean psychiatrist

Kua Ee Heok BBM FRCPsych
- Born: November 1948 (age 77); Batu Pahat, Johor, Malaysia
- Citizenship: Singaporean
- Education: University of Malaya, University of Oxford, Harvard University
- Occupation: Psychiatrist
- Known for: Gerontology research
- Relatives: Kua Kia Soong (brother)
- Medical career
- Field: Psychiatry, gerontology, geriatrics, dementia
- Awards: International Association of Gerontology Sandoz Award

Kua Ee Heok (Chinese: 柯以煜) is a Singaporean psychiatrist and the Tan Geok Yin Professor in Psychiatry and Neuroscience at the National University of Singapore.

== Early life and education ==
Kua was born in Batu Pahat, Johor, Malaysia, the sixth of seven children of a well-to-do Chinese Teochew family. He studied medicine at the University of Malaya from 1968 to 1973, receiving an MBBS degree. After graduating, he was conscripted into the Malaysian Armed Forces to be an army doctor during the Second Malayan Insurgency. He served for two years before returning to Johor with the intention of opening a clinic. He was eventually convinced by a friend to go abroad instead, enrolling into the University of Manchester to undertake a Master of Medicine, initially planning to specialise in pediatrics. He later specialised in psychiatry after working at a hospital and elderly home in the United Kingdom.

In 1976, he transferred to the University of Oxford and received a scholarship. In 1980, he completed his training and became a member of the Royal College of Psychiatrists, from which he received a fellowship in 1982. Following his training at Oxford, he worked at Woodbridge Hospital as a psychiatrist for one year, before being posted to the National University of Singapore's Psychological Medicine Department, where he was a lecturer and physician at the affiliated Singapore General Hospital. In 1984, he further trained at Harvard University in geriatric psychiatry on a Rockefeller Foundation scholarship. In 1992, he trained in psychiatry research at the National Institute of Health and received a research medical doctorate (MD) from the National University of Singapore.

== Career ==
Kua was the last psychiatrist to see Tan Mui Choon, a perpetrator of the Toa Payoh ritual murders, and prescribed her medication for her schizophrenia. The medication was later used by Tan and her husband to drug several children who were later murdered. In his notes, he wrote that Tan was 'generally well' and was 'satisfied' that Tan was in a 'state of remission' while she carried out the murders. His assessment, along with those of other psychiatrists, were taken into consideration in during the proceeding trial.

From 1999 to 2002, he was the CEO and medical director of the Institute of Mental Health. He was the editor for the Singapore Medical Journal from 1996 to 1999 and former president of the Gerontological Society of Singapore.

In 2023, a novel by Kua about senior citizens in psychotherapy was turned into a play.

== Research ==
Kua has published over 270 research papers and 23 books. In 1987, he led a WHO study that disproved dementia statistics of Singaporeans at the time. He developed the Elderly Cognitive Assessment Questionnaire by modifying the mini–mental state examination for an Asian, illiterate audience with poor educational backgrounds. The questionnaire is still in use in Singapore as of 2013.

Kua was the lead investigator of the Jurong Ageing Study, a study in Singapore designed to investigate the link between isolation and dementia.

== Personal life ==
Kua is a naturalised Singapore citizen. He is married and has a son and a daughter. His daughter, Jade Kua, is an emergency medicine doctor.
