= Kamunting Detention Centre =

Prison in Kamunting, Perak, Malaysia

Kamunting Detention Centre Kem Tahanan Perlindungan Kamunting
- Interactive map of Kamunting Detention Centre; Kem Tahanan Perlindungan Kamunting
- Location: Kamunting, Perak, Malaysia; 4°54′33″N 100°44′13″E
- Status: Active
- Security class: Supermax
- Opened: November 1973
- Managed by: Ministry of Home Affairs
- Director: Saifuddin Nasution Ismail

The Kamunting Detention Centre (KEMTA; Malay: Kem Tahanan Perlindungan Kamunting) is a prison camp in Kamunting, Larut, Matang and Selama District, Perak, Malaysia. The prison is used by the government to detain and interrogate persons arrested under the Internal Security Act (ISA). The detention is also known as Malaysia's Supermax prison or Maximum security prison. It is alleged that this is the site where the Malaysian authorities would hold up political prisoners. Among notable events which prompted widespread use of the ISA were Operation Lalang in 1987 and the years during the Reformasi movement, beginning 1999. The centre has also been used to detain other groups of people declared by the government to be a threat to national security such as terrorists and cults. Some notable groups detained in Kamunting includes the Al-Arqam cult and the Al-Ma'unah terrorist group.

== Population statistics ==
Type of offence	Number of detainees past and present (2014)
Communists	1,702
Document falsification	433
Terrorists	193
Human trafficking	159
Producing fake coins	66
Religious and racial issues	40
Subversive	38
Intelligence	16
Reformation activists	7
Supplier of nuclear component	1
Grand total	2,770

== Notable ex-detainees ==
- James Wong - Federal opposition leader from Sarawak in 1974
- Anwar Ibrahim - Malaysia's former Deputy Prime Minister.
- Lim Kit Siang - Opposition leader
- Jeffrey Kitingan - Deputy Chief Minister of Sabah
- Karpal Singh - Opposition leader
- Michael Jeyakumar Devaraj - Parti Sosialis Malaysia leader
- Lim Guan Eng - former Finance Minister
- Mohamad Sabu - former Defence Minister
- Teresa Kok - former Primary Industry Minister
- Tuang Pik King - Civil rights activist
- Cecilia Ng - Civil rights activist
