= Internal Security Act 1960 =

Legislative act from Malaysia

Parliament of the Federation of Malaya
- Long title: An Act to provide for the internal security of Malaysia, preventive detention, the prevention of subversion, the suppression of organized violence against persons and property in specified areas of Malaysia, and for matters incidental thereto.
- Citation: Act 82 (First enacted as Act No. 18 of 1960; Revised as Act 82 w.e.f 1 August 1972)
- Territorial extent: Malaysia
- Passed by: Dewan Rakyat
- Passed: 22 June 1960
- Passed by: Dewan Negara
- Passed: 6 July 1960
- Effective: Peninsular Malaysia–1 August 1960, Act No. 18 of 1960; East Malaysia—16 September 1963, L.N. 232/1963
- Repealed: 31 July 2012

Legislative history

Initiating chamber: Dewan Rakyat
- Bill title: Internal Security Bill 1960
- Bill citation: D.R.17/1960
- Introduced by: Abdul Razak Hussein, Minister of Defence
- First reading: 20 April 1960
- Second reading: 21 June 1960
- Third reading: 22 June 1960

Revising chamber: Dewan Negara
- Bill title: Internal Security Bill 1960
- Bill citation: D.R.17/1960
- Member(s) in charge: Leong Yew Koh, Minister of Justice
- First reading: 29 June 1960
- Second reading: 6 July 1960
- Third reading: 6 July 1960

Repeals
- Public Order Ordinance 1947 [Ord. 14 of 1947]

Amended by
- Internal Security (Amendment) Act 1962 [Act 9/1962] Modification of Laws (Internal Security and Public Order) (Borneo States) Order 1963 [L.N. 232/1963] Corrigendum to L.N. 232/1963 [L.N. 239/1963] Modification of Laws (Internal Security Act 1960) Order 1963 [L.N. 284/1963] Modification of Laws (Internal Security Act 1960) Order 1964 [L.N. 334/1964] Emergency (Internal Security and Detention Orders) Regulations 1964 [L.N. 335/1964] Internal Security (Amendment) Act 1964 [Act 20/1964] Modification of Laws (Internal Security Act 1960) (Amendment) Order 1965 [L.N. 69/1965] Emergency (Internal Security and Detention Orders) (Amendment) Regulations 1965 [L.N. 110/1965] Internal Security (Amendment) Act 1965 [Act 25/1966] Resolution of the Senate of 05-09-1966 made under section 83 [P.U. 415/1966] Resolution of the House of Representatives of 22-08-1966 made under section 83 [P.U. 416/1966] Registration of Criminals and Undesirable Persons Act 1969 [Act 7] Corrigendum to Act 7 [P.U. (B) 180/1969] Emergency (Internal Security) (Modification of Laws) Ordinance 1969 [Ordinance 4, 1969—P.U. (A) 186/1969] Internal Security (Amendment) Act 1971 [Act A61] Resolution under section 83 of the Internal Security Act 1960 [P.U. (B) 336/1975] Malaysian Currency (Ringgit) Act 1975 [Act 160] Federal Territory of Labuan (Modification of Internal Security Act) Order 1985 [P.U. (A) 198/1985] Internal Security (Amendment) Act 1988 [Act A705] Internal Security (Amendment) Act 1989 [Act A739]

Repealed by
- Security Offences (Special Measures) Act 2012

Keywords
- Internal security, organized crime, preventive detention, subversion, suppression, organized violence
- Status: Repealed

The Internal Security Act 1960 (Malay: Akta Keselamatan Dalam Negeri 1960, abbreviated ISA) was a preventive detention law in force in Malaysia. The legislation was enacted after the Federation of Malaya gained independence from Britain in 1957. The ISA allows for detention without trial or criminal charges under limited, legally defined circumstances. On 15 September 2011, the Prime Minister of Malaysia, Najib Razak said that this legislation will be repealed and replaced by two new laws. The ISA was replaced and repealed by the Security Offences (Special Measures) Act 2012 which has been passed by Parliament and given the royal assent on 18 June 2012. The Act came into force on 31 July 2012.

== Structure ==
The Internal Security Act 1960 was consisted of 4 Parts containing 85 sections and 3 schedules (including 21 amendments).

- Part I: Preliminary
- Part II: General Provisions Relating to Internal Security
  - Chapter I: Prohibition of Organizations and Associations of a Political or Quasi-Military Character and Uniforms, etc.
  - Chapter II: Powers of Preventive Detention
  - Chapter III: Special Powers Relating to Subversive Publications, etc.
  - Chapter IV: Control of Entertainments and Exhibitions
  - Chapter V: Other Powers for the Prevention of Subversion
  - Chapter VI: Miscellaneous
- Part III: Special Provisions Relating to Security Areas
  - Chapter I: Proclamation of Security Areas
  - Chapter II: Powers Relating to Preservation of Public Security
  - Chapter III: Offences Relating to Security Areas
  - Chapter IV: Powers of Police and others
  - Chapter V: General
  - Chapter VI: Power to make Regulations
- Part IV: Miscellaneous Provisions
- Schedules

== History ==
Preventive detention was first implemented in Malaya by the British in 1948 to combat the armed insurgency of the Malayan Communist Party during the Malayan Emergency. The Emergency Regulations Ordinance 1948 was enacted by the British High Commissioner Sir Edward Gent. It allowed the detention of persons for a period not exceeding one year. This ordinance targeted acts of violence and only imposed temporary detention. The Malayan Emergency ended in 1960 and the ordinance was repealed. However, preventive detention was retained and remains a feature of Malaysian law today. In 1960, the government passed the Internal Security Act (ISA) under the authority granted by Article 149 the Malaysian Constitution.

The stated purpose of the ISA was to deter communist activity in Malaysia during the Malayan Emergency and afterwards. The first Prime Minister of Malaysia, Tunku Abdul Rahman, defined the purpose of the act as to "be used solely against the communists...My Cabinet colleagues and I gave a solemn promise to Parliament and the nation that the immense powers given to the government under the ISA would never be used to stifle legitimate opposition and silence lawful dissent".

In response to criticism that the ISA was not democratic or was too open to abuse, the first internal security minister, Ismail Abdul Rahman, stated:

I maintained then and I maintain now the view that the Internal Security Act is essential to the security of this country especially when democracy is interpreted the way it is interpreted in this country. To those in opposition to the government democracy is interpreted to mean absolute freedom, even the freedom to subvert the nation. When cornered by the argument that democracy in the Western sense means freedom in an ordered society and an ordered society is one in which the rule of law prevails, they seek refuge in the slogan that we should imitate Western democracy one hundred per cent. I am convinced that the Internal Security Act as practiced in Malaysia is not contrary to the fundamentals of democracy. Abuse of the Act can be prevented by vigilant public opinion via elections, a free Press and above all the Parliament.

However, partly due to massive street protests involving the public and politicians from both sides which portrayed the ISA as draconian and unnecessary in view of Malaysia's progress to "developed nation" status, on 15 September 2011, Prime Minister Najib Razak announced that The Internal Security Act will be abolished. Two new laws will be introduced instead to safeguard peace and order.

== Reform ==
The government is in the final stages of revising the Internal Security Act. Home Minister Datuk Seri Hishammuddin Tun Hussein has stated that ISA amendments will revolve around five areas – the length of detention, rights and treatment of detainees and their families, the power of the home minister, the use of ISA for political reasons and detention without trial. In revising the ISA, the government met with key stakeholders to discuss amendments. Hishammuddin and Home Ministry's officials met for about three hours with representatives from the Attorney-General's Chambers, the Bar Council, the Barisan Nasional Backbenchers Club, the National Council for Women's Organisations and the National Civics Bureau. The Home Minister said that during the discussions, all parties agreed that there should be a law in place to protect the people against terrorism and militancy. The Law Reform Committee set up to review detentions under the Internal Security Act (ISA) has submitted its amendment proposals to the Cabinet. Parliament is expected to conclude its review of the amendments during its current sitting.

== Law ==
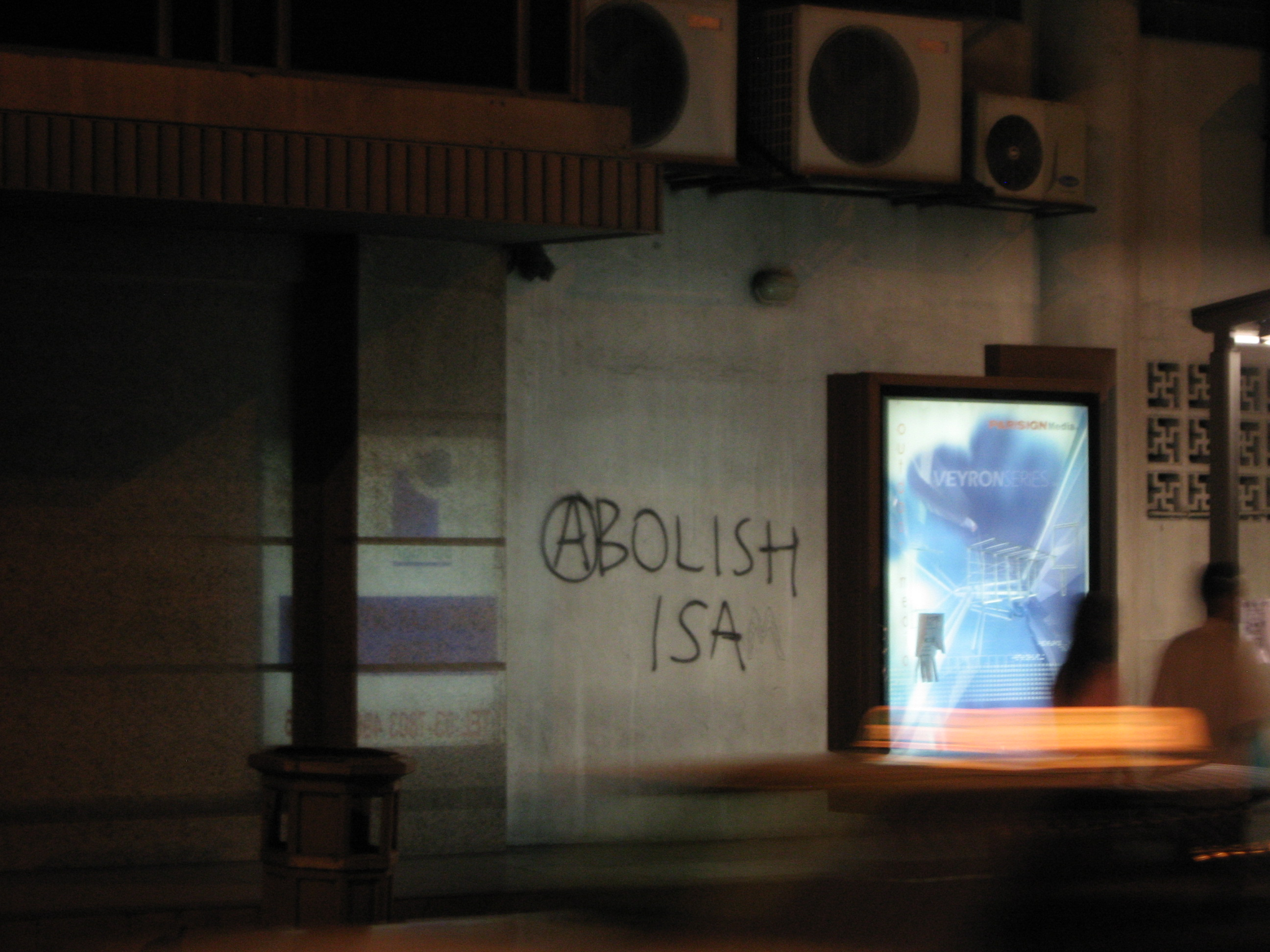
Graffito in Kuala Lumpur advocating abolition of the Internal Security Act.

Some notable sections of the legislation include:

Section 73(1) Internal Security Act 1960: "Any police officer may without warrant arrest and detain pending enquiries any person in respect of whom he has reason to believe that there are grounds which would justify his detention under section 8; and that he has acted or is about to act or is likely to act in any manner prejudicial to the security of Malaysia or any part thereof or to maintenance of essential services therein or to the economic life thereof."

Section 8 ISA: Power to order detention or restriction of persons. "(i) If the Minister is satisfied that the detention of any person is necessary with a view to preventing him from acting in any manner prejudicial to the security of Malaysia or any part thereof or to the maintenance of essential services therein or the economic life thereof, he may make an order (hereinafter referred to as a detention order) directing that that person be detained for any period not exceeding two years."

Section 8(1) theoretically restricts detention to a period not exceeding two years but this limit is readily circumvented because under Section 8(7), the duration of the detention order may be extended indefinitely in increments of up to two years The extension of the detention order may be made on the same grounds as those on which the original order was based or on different grounds. In delivering the judgment of the Court, Steve L.K. Shim CJ (Sabah & Sarawak) in Kerajaan Malaysia & 2 Ors. v Nasharuddin bin Nasir (2003) 6 AMR 497 at page 506, ruled that the powers extended to the Home Minister are valid under the Malaysian Constitution. In addition, preventive detention is also now allowed by the Dangerous Drugs (Special Preventive Measures) Act 1985 and the Emergency (Public Order and Prevention of Crime) Ordinance 1969. The Human Rights Commission of Malaysia (SUHAKAM) has recently recommended that the ISA be repealed and replaced by new comprehensive legislation that, while taking a tough stand on threats to national security (including terrorism), does not violate basic human rights.

A detenu can make representations against his/her detention if an order of detention has been made against the detenu by the Minister under Section 8(1) of the ISA but under Section 73 however, the detenu seems to have no such right. Generally, the attitude of the Malaysian courts in respect of detention under Section 73 is that the courts have jurisdiction only in regard to any question on compliance with the procedural requirements of the ISA and they seldom grant any substantive rights to the detenu.

Article 151 of the Malaysian Constitution gives to any person detained without trial (under the special powers against subversion) certain administrative rights. By the terms of Article 151 the authority, on whose order a person is detained, shall, as soon as may be, inform the detainee of the grounds of detention and the allegations of fact on which the order is based. The detainee shall also be given an opportunity within three months, of making representations against the order to an Advisory Board . The Advisory Board as the name implies is not a court. Its determinations are also mere recommendations that the government is under no obligation to accept. It may also be handicapped in its deliberations by the discretionary power of the government to withhold facts, the disclosure of which would, in the executive’s opinion be against national interest.

Any person may be detained by the police for up to 60 days without trial for an act which allegedly threatens the security of the country or any part thereof. After 60 days, one may be further detained for a period of two years each, to be approved by the Minister of Home Affairs, thus permitting indefinite detention without trial. In 1989, the powers of the Minister under the legislation was made immune to judicial review by virtue of amendments to the Act, only allowing the courts to examine and review technical matters pertaining to the ISA arrest.

== The Reid Commission ==
‘Anti-government’ has at times been simply equated to being ‘anti-national’. In their Report, the Reid Commission (that was entrusted with the job of drafting the Merdeka Constitution) mentioned that the rights they were recommending had already been firmly established throughout Malaya and the guarantee of the fundamental rights would be provided by the mechanisms of: the Constitution being the supreme law; ‘the power and duty of the Courts to enforce these rights’; and, ‘the Courts would annul any attempt to subvert any of them whether by legislative or administrative action or otherwise’. [See Chapter IX, Fundamental Rights: Constitutional Guarantees, Para 161 p. 70 of the Report.]

Hardial Singh Khaira [Is it the ISA per se or the Interpretations Given by the Judiciary that Makes it Such a Draconian Law Now?], in his analysis of judgments related to the ISA maintains that 'not only have the Malaysian courts failed to annul the encroachments on the fundamental rights but their lack of judicial activism has in fact subverted those rights further. The failure of the Malaysian courts in relation to the ISA starts with the fact that they have generally accepted the subjective satisfaction of the executive for justifying the detention of an individual.' He further adds that the 'current approach of the Malaysian courts only serves to reduce executive accountability and respect for human rights under the rule of law.'

== Release ==
Although the government may release detainees unconditionally, in some cases, it has required those being released to make a public confession on television and radio.

The case of Raja Petra Kamarudin, a well known blogger of Malaysia Today website, detained under the Internal Security Act on 12 September 2008 and was subsequently released 56 days later, was due to the habeas corpus filed by his lawyer citing unlawful detention by the Home Ministry. The High court, on 7 November 2008, over-ruled that detention and he was set free on the same day.

== Criticism ==
Due to the alleged draconian nature of the ISA, several human rights organisations and opposition political parties have strongly criticised the act and called for its repeal. Foreign governments, notably that of the United States, have also pressured the government to repeal the act.

After the promise to repeal the ISA made in September 2011, there was nonetheless cynicism about the timing and delay of the repeal.

=== Domestic ===
Several opposition parties such as the Pan-Malaysian Islamic Party (PAS), the Democratic Action Party (DAP) and Parti Keadilan Rakyat (PKR) have spoken out against the ISA. Many of them have leaders or prominent members who were held under the ISA, such as Mohamad Sabu of PAS, Lim Kit Siang, Karpal Singh and Lim Guan Eng of the DAP, and Anwar Ibrahim of the PKR. Previously in the 1960s, the law had been denounced by such opposition leaders as Tan Chee Khoon, who said:

This infernal and heinous instrument has been enacted by the Alliance Government at a time when the emergency was supposed to be over. Then it promptly proceeds to embody all the provisions of the Emergency Regulations which during the Emergency had to be re-enacted every year, but now it is written into the statute book ad infinitum...

However, several politicians from the Barisan Nasional coalition, including its largest component party, the United Malays National Organisation (UMNO or Umno), that has governed Malaysia since independence have also criticised the ISA. The fifth Prime Minister of Malaysia, Abdullah Ahmad Badawi, went on the record in 1988 to state "If we want to save Malaysia and Umno, Dr Mahathir (then Prime Minister) must be removed. He uses draconian laws such as the Internal Security Act to silence his critics." The year before, he had also stated "Laws such as the Internal Security Act have no place in modern Malaysia. It is a draconian and barbaric law." In 2003 when he became prime minister, however, Abdullah called the ISA "a necessary law," and argued "We have never misused the Internal Security Act. All those detained under the Internal Security Act are proven threats to society." But opposition parties believe it is a threat to Umno rather than a threat to the country.

Prior to becoming prime minister, Mahathir had also adhered to a critical view of the ISA. In 1966, when Mahathir spoke out in support of the Internal Security (Amendment) Bill 1966 as a backbencher, he stated that "no one in his right senses like[s] the ISA. It is in fact a negation of all the principles of democracy." After becoming Prime Minister however the former premier had little if any hesitation using the law to suppress what he termed racialism but was seen by some as a move against his political opponents, the most notable of events being the infamous Operasi Lalang in 1987.

Recently former rapporteur to the United Nations Param Cumaraswamy, who is on record for his opposition of the ISA, suggested its use on former Malaysian prime minister Dr. Mahathir for alleged racial incitement by the latter at a speech in Johor Bahru on 17 May 2008, arguing that the reasoning of the former premier in the use of the law would be applicable against him now in light of his own racial excesses Such tit for tat justification however was condemned by various groups, notably PAS for inconsistency and double standards shown by the former rapporteur in his position as regards the ISA.

In Kota Kinabalu, United Pasokmomogun Kadazandusun Murut Organisation (UPKO) led by its secretary-general Datuk Wilfred Madius Tangau, on 23 September 2008, joined its 3 other Barisan Nasional (BN) counterparts MCA, Gerakan and MIC, petitioning government review of ISA. Madius said the party supports former de facto Law Minister Datuk Zaid Ibrahim's position that the ISA should only be used against those who posed a threat to national security, such as terrorists: "Clearly in the case of Seputeh MP, Teresa Kok, Raja Petra Kamaruddin, and Sin Chew Daily reporter, Tan Hoon Cheng, there are so many other public order laws that can be used against them if, at all, there is a case to do so."

== Notable uses of the ISA ==
Since 1960 when the Act was enacted, thousands of people including trade unionists, student leaders, labour activists, political activists, religious groups, academics, NGO activists have been arrested under the ISA. Many political activists in the past have been detained for more than a decade.

As of 2005, 10,662 people have been arrested under the ISA in the previous 44 years, 4,139 were issued with formal detention orders and 2,066 were served with restriction orders governing their activities and where they live. In addition, 12 people were executed for offences under the ISA between 1984 and 1993. Source: Figures were provided in a written answer by Prime Minister Abdullah Ahmad Badawi, who is also Minister for Internal Security, to parliamentary opposition leader Lim Kit Siang, whose statement was quoted by AFP in newsreports dated 3 February 2005

The ISA has been consistently used against people who criticise the government and defend human rights. Known as the "white terror", it has been the most feared and despised, yet convenient tool for the state to suppress opposition and open debate. The Act is seen by some as an instrument maintained by the ruling government to control public life and civil society.

The ISA was used extensively during the 1987 Operation Lalang under the rule of prime minister Dr Mahathir Mohamad. During the security operation conducted by the Royal Malaysia Police between 27 October and 20 November 1987, as estimated 119 political activists, opposition politicians, intellectuals and students were detained without trial. Among them were a sizable number of DAP MPs including Lim Kit Siang, Karpal Singh, V. David, P. Patto, Hu Sepang, Lim Guan Eng and Tan Seng Giaw. During this time mass media such as The Star newspaper were also shut down.

Many opposition leaders were detained under ISA in the aftermath of the 1998 Reformasi protests which followed the sacking and detention of then deputy prime minister Anwar Ibrahim. Its use resurfaced again in 2008 with further detentions of opposition leaders such as Teresa Kok.

The ISA was also used against militants. In August 2011, 3 Indian nationals who were members of the Babbar Khalsa International were arrested and deported. A Jemaah Islamiah member arrested in 2009 under the ISA was deported to Indonesia. Jemaah Islamiah leader Mas Selamat was also arrested under the ISA after his escape from Singapore.

One of the most recent application of ISA was against Hindu activists belonging to the group HINDRAF who voiced out against the government policies that resulted in Malaysian Indians being marginalised and sidelined from the country's development. In response, Prime Minister Abdullah Ahmad Badawi personally signed the detention order that allows the leaders of HINDRAF to be detained without trial for two years, with the option for the detention order to be renewed indefinitely.

The government of Prime Minister Najib Razak has used the similar Emergency Ordinance on several occasions.

== Repeal ==
Prime Minister Najib Razak first announced the proposed repeal of the ISA on 15 September 2011 when he claimed that the repeal was made "to accommodate and realise a mature, modern and functioning democracy; to preserve public order; enhance civil liberty and maintain racial harmony." The ISA is to be repealed and replaced by the Security Offences (Special Measures) Act 2012 which was passed and given the royal assent on 18 June 2012 but is not yet in force as of July 2012 as it is still waiting for the date of commencement to be announced by the Minister of Home Affairs, Hishammuddin Hussein. On 9 July 2012, Najib Razak was reported to have said that the ISA was scrapped because it did not help the ruling government politically.

== See also ==
- Security and Public Order Division
- Internal Security Act (Singapore), the same Act extended to Singapore
- Kamunting Detention Centre (KEMTA)
- Operation Lalang
- Police Act 1967

== Notes and references ==
=== Other references ===
- text of the Internal Security Act (Act 82) at the Attorney General's website
- Chow, Kum Hor (6 November 2005). "9/11 changed Hu's view of ISA". New Sunday Times, p. 8–9.
- Kamaruddin, Raja Petra (31 October 2005). "A taste of one’s own medicine". Malaysia Today.
- Kamaruddin, Raja Petra (4 November 2005). "The true meaning of political doublespeak". Malaysia Today.
- Khaira, Hardial Singh, Preventive Detention: Part I – Constitutional Rights and the Executive, [2007] 1 MLJ lxiii; [2007] 1 MLJA 63
- Khaira, Hardial Singh, Preventive Detention: Part II – Police Power To Arrest And Detain Pending Enquiries [2007] 4 MLJ cxxxii; [2007] 4 MLJA 132
- mytwosens.blogspot.com
- (September 1999) "Document – Malaysia: Human rights undermined: Restrictive laws in a parliamentary democracy", Chapter 4. Amnesty International.
