= Kua Kia Soong =

Malaysian social activist (born c. 1950)

- 柯嘉逊

Member of the Malaysian Parliament for Petaling Jaya
- In office 1990–1995
- Preceded by: Eng Seng Chai
- Succeeded by: Constituency abolished
- Majority: 15,950

Personal details
- Born: c.1950
- Party: Democratic Action Party (DAP)
- Education: University of Manchester
- Occupation: Social activist, researcher

Kua Kia Soong (born c. 1950; Chinese: 柯嘉逊) is a Malaysian social activist, researcher and former member of parliament for Petaling Jaya (1990–1995). He is a director of the human-rights organisation SUARAM.

== Family ==
Kua's grandfather, Kua Kim Pah, was an immigrant from Chaozhou China and founder of a bank in Batu Pahat, Johor. His brother is Kua Ee Heok, a psychiatrist based in Singapore.

== Education ==
Kua was educated at SRJK(C) Lim Poon and SMK Tinggi Batu Pahat. He then received a BA and MA in economics from the University of Manchester. He holds a PhD in sociology. He served as principal of New Era College, Kajang, Selangor.

== Election results ==
Parliament of Malaysia
Year	Constituency	Candidate	Votes	Pct	Opponent(s)	Votes	Pct	Ballots cast	Majority	Turnout
1990	P090 Petaling Jaya	Kua Kia Soong (DAP)	40,685	62.19%	Soh Chee Wen (MCA)	24,735	37.81%	66,581	15,950	67.68%

== Published work ==
- Questioning Arms Spending in Malaysia :Gerakbudaya, 2010.
- New Era College controversy : the betrayal of Dong Jiao Zong : Oriengroup, c2009.
- May 13: Declassified Documents on the Malaysian Riots of 1969: Suaram Komunikasi, c2007.
- Policing the Malaysian police / editor Kua Kia Soong. :Suaram Komunikasi, 2005
- The Malaysian : civil rights movement :SIRD, 2005.
- Malaysian political realities :Oriengroup, 1992.
- Malaysian cultural policy and democracy / compiled & edited by Kua Kia Soong. :The Resource and Research Centre, 1990.
- Of myths and mystification, 1986
- Malaysian political myths, 1990
- 445 days behind the wire, 1989
- Reforming Malaysia, 1993
- Malaysia's energy crisis, 1996
- 445 days under Operation Lalang, 2000
- Malaysian Critical Issues, 2002
- Xin ji yuan jiao yu
- 20 years defending human rights
- The Chinese schools of Malaysia, 1990
- Inside the DAP, 1990–95 (1996)
- Protean Saga: The Chinese Schools of Malaysia
- 13 May: Declassified Documents on the Malaysian Riots of 1969. Buku ini terbit pada 2007 oleh SUARAM.
