= Capital punishment in Malaysia =

Capital punishment in Malaysia is used as a penalty within its legal system for various crimes, although there have been no executions since 2017. There are currently 30 capital crimes in Malaysia, including murder, drug trafficking, treason, acts of terrorism, waging war against the King, rape resulting in death, and nuclear-related offences. Executions are carried out by hanging. Capital punishment was mandatory for 11 crimes for many years. In October 2018, the Malaysian government imposed a moratorium on all executions with a view to abolish the death penalty entirely. However, due to mixed public opinion, it backtracked on its stance and instead choose to preserve the death penalty, but would make it discretionary.

On 4 July 2023, mandatory capital punishment was officially abolished when the Abolition of Mandatory Death Penalty Act 2023 came into force, allowing judges to choose between either the death penalty or a jail term of 30 to 40 years and not less than 12 strokes of whipping for capital offences.

The last execution in Malaysia happened on 24 May 2017, when 48-year-old Yong Kar Mun, who was convicted of discharging a firearm during a robbery, together with another unnamed man who was convicted of murder and spent over 20 years on death row, were hanged at the Sungai Buloh Prison. Recent administrations have been tacitly abolitionist in practice, although the death penalty retains significant support among the public.

== History ==
The idea behind capital punishment in Malaysia arose from a mix between the common law system that Malaysia inherited from British colonisation, as British Malaya, and the authorisation of capital punishment in Islam.

== Current practice ==
Death penalties are carried out in Malaysia by hanging. In 2015, the death penalty was mandatory in twelve offences and possible in thirty-three. The thirty-three capital crimes included murder, drug trafficking, treason, acts of terrorism, waging war against the Yang di-Pertuan Agong, and, since 2007, rape resulting in death. As of March 2023, there were 34 capital crimes, including murder and drug trafficking, with 11 of them carrying the mandatory death penalty.

On 3 April 2023, the Dewan Rakyat passed the Abolition of Mandatory Death Penalty Bill 2023 to abolish all mandatory death penalty under Malaysian criminal law. The bill was subsequently approved by the Dewan Negara on 11 April 2023 and received royal assent from the Yang di-Pertuan Agong on 9 June 2023. The Abolition of Mandatory Death Penalty Act 2023 [Act 846] eventually came into force on 4 July 2023. There had been no executions in the country since 2017.

== Public opinion and calls for abolition ==
The abolition of the mandatory death penalty started to gain momentum in Malaysia in the 2010s, and the government started to consider more humane ways to "uphold the justice for the people." It was found that although a substantial portion of the public agree with capital punishment in cases of murder, drug trafficking, and firearms offences, it dropped once the participants were told about the various scenarios which merited capital punishment as defined in the relevant statute.

However, 82 per cent of Malaysians opposed the government's move to abolish capital punishment, according to a poll by the online edition of Berita Harian, Harian Metro and New Straits Times in October 2018.

=== Universal Periodic Review 2009 ===
Malaysia has been reviewed twice by the United Nations Human Rights Council under the Universal Periodic Review (UPR). First in 2009 and the other in 2013. In 2009, Malaysia reported in their national report that the death sentence was only imposed on the most serious crimes and was in line with Article 6 of the ICCPR. They also held that there were several safeguards in place in the legal system that have to be met before a death penalty can be passed.

Of the various non-governmental organisations that made a submission for the review, three had an extract about capital punishment. The first was the Human Rights Commission of Malaysia (SUHAKAM). In their report, they noted that they were against capital punishment and natural life sentences and recommended that such cases be reviewed by the Pardon Board. Amnesty International reported that although such a heavy punishment was being carried out, very little information about execution itself was actually made public. This included when the punishment was set to be carried out, the person being punished and who had been executed.

It appeared in the same report that according to 'Malaysians Against Death Penalty' there were a total of 300 inmates on death row in prison in January 2008. Most of them were for drug related offences. The Coalition of Malaysian NGOs in the UPR Process stated that they took the same stance as Amnesty International and noted that the death penalty went against the Convention Against Torture and Other Cruel, Inhuman or Degrading Treatment or Punishment.

As for the Working Groups report, several nations including France, Djibouti, Egypt and Sudan recommended for a range of actions to be taken against the death penalty. This included suggestions of outright abolition to ratifying the ICCPR and applying the relevant standards when the death penalty was imposed. Malaysia re-affirmed their position on the matter and stated that the death penalty was only applied in the most severe cases. However, they noted that they were at the time attempting to remove the death penalty and caning of those below the age of 18 through an amendment of the Essential (Security Cases) Regulations 1975 and at the same time, would consider a reduction in offences which carry the death penalty in a step towards the abolition of the death penalty outright.

=== Universal Periodic Review 2013 ===
In its national report, Malaysia re-iterated its statement made in the 2009 Periodic Review. They added though that there has recently been discussion with the public about the possibility of abolition of the death penalty. They also noted that a study has been undertaken to reform the criminal justice in which included offences with a death penalty upon conviction. Amnesty International prepared another report for submission for the 2013 Universal Periodic Review. With regards about their submission to the death penalty in 2009, the organisation reported that none of the past recommendations have been implemented yet and reported that currently, there were a total of 930 inmates on death row. The Child Rights Information Network reported that the death penalty was still in force in Malaysia which allowed for the death penalty sentence to be passed under Article 97 of the Child Act 2001. The report submitted Joint Submission number 8 reported that convictions under s302 of the Penal code for murder still occurs in Malaysia.

The report noted that Malaysia's approach to drug offences violated international standards. They further noted that there was a serious lack of due process given that those accused of drug trafficking are presumed guilty upon arrest. The organisation argued that as a result of these presumptions, it has led to hundreds of death sentences and executions. They next reported that for treason which was punishable by death, at least 4 people were executed because of it in 2007. In the working group's report, several nations commented on the fact that Malaysia still has the death penalty and suggested that the death penalty be abolished or that a moratorium on the death penalty be recognised. Some of the nations that recommended this included Spain, Switzerland, Argentina, Belgium, Costa Rica and Kazakhstan. Malaysia responded with a statement that they would keep their options open and continue to engage the public on this subject. They would also look into alternatives to the death penalty. Malaysia pledged that it would complete its review on the moratorium of the death penalty with the intent to abolish it at a later date.

== Recent developments ==
In 2016, Malaysia carried out nine executions, imposed 36 death sentences, and two death sentences were commuted. Malaysia was also reported to have 1,042 death row inmates, including 413 foreign nationals. According to the World Coalition Against the Death Penalty, Malaysia carried out four executions in 2017.

Ongoing discussions to repeal the death penalty as a mandatory sentence have occurred during the 2010s.

On 10 October 2018, Liew Vui Keong, the minister in charge of law in the Prime Minister's Department, announced that the Malaysian Government would abolish the death penalty. The minister announced that the government had imposed a moratorium on all executions until the passage of the new law. The Pakatan Harapan government had campaigned on reviewing capital punishment and other "unsuitable" national security laws during the 2018 Malaysian general election. The bill would mean that these serious crimes might only face the possibility of the death penalty in a High Court sentencing.

The government's announcement to abolish capital punishment was welcomed by Kumi Naidoo, Amnesty International's Secretary General, who called on the Malaysian Parliament to consign the death penalty to the history books. In contrast, multiple groups and people have come out against the abolition of the death penalty, including non-governmental Malay dominance organization, Perkasa.

In March 2019, the government announced its decision to retain the death penalty, although it was announced that, despite the death penalty being retained as an official punishment in Malaysia, it will no longer be used as a mandatory punishment.

On 13 July 2019, Minister in Prime Minister's Department Datuk Liew Vui Keong disclosed that a Bill to abolish mandatory death penalty was expected to be tabled in Parliament in October once the government had decided on appropriate prison terms for 11 serious crimes that it covers.

On 10 December 2019, the Law Minister Liew Vui Keong announced that an anticipated proposal on alternatives to the death penalty would be submitted in January 2020, allowing judges a discretion in certain serious crimes. The 2020–2022 Malaysian political crisis beginning in February 2020 led to a change in government, but subsequently the new Law Minister Wan Junaidi Tuanku Jaafar confirmed on 10 June 2022, that mandatory capital punishment would be formally abolished, with capital punishment being under the discretion of a judge. After the 2022 Malaysian general election led to another change in government, the new administration formally passed new legislation in April 2023 officially abolishing the mandatory death penalty, with Deputy Law Minister Ramkarpal Singh telling Parliament, "The death penalty has not brought the results it was intended to bring."

In April 2023, the Anwar Ibrahim cabinet introduced legislation in Parliament formally repealing the mandatory death penalty. The new law would replace the mandatory death penalty with a sentence of 30 to 40 years in prison, with the exception of offences under the Dangerous Drugs Act 1952 where life imprisonment would remain a possibility. The law would repeal the death penalty altogether for 10 offences, and allow judges discretion to either impose the death penalty or a prison sentence in 11 other offences.

On 3 April 2023, the Dewan Rakyat approved the Abolition of Mandatory Death Penalty Bill 2023 by voice vote to abolish mandatory death penalty. The death penalty would be retained, but courts would have discretion to replace it with other punishments, including whipping and imprisonment of 30–40 years. This new jail term replaces sentences "for the duration of the offender's natural life". Life imprisonment in Malaysian law was defined as a fixed 30-year term of imprisonment.

The revised law took effect on 4 July 2023, and the death row population in Malaysia were also given a chance to review their cases for re-sentencing by the Federal Court of Malaysia under another newly enacted law called Revision of Sentence of Death and Imprisonment for Natural Life (Temporary Jurisdiction of the Federal Court) Act 2023. The reform allowed some death row criminals to escape the gallows, like Teh Kim Hong, who was convicted of the 2008 murder of Lai Ying Xin and received 40 years' jail in lieu of death. However, there were other cases where the Federal Court refused to commute the death sentences, like the 2014 Kuching double killer Zulkipli Abdullah, and Shahril Jaafar who raped and killed a female jogger.

As of 31 May 2024, 474 out of a total of 936 re-sentencing applications were heard by the Federal Court, and only 19 of the condemned had their death sentences upheld. According to Datuk Seri Azalina Othman Said, all these 19 prisoners were convicted of murder, most of whom were either child killers or had killed more than one person.

On 1 December 2025, a major amendment to the Atomic Energy Licensing Act 1984 took effect and introduced three new criminal offences with discretionary death penalty. Under the 2025 amendment, the manufacturing, testing, stockpiling, transferring, use, or stationing of nuclear weapons is punishable by death. Further, any activity involving radioactive or nuclear materials with intention to cause death may also subjected to the same punishment. An act of sabotage against a nuclear facility which resulted in death may also be punished with the death penalty.

== Statutory provisions ==
=== Offences currently punishable with death ===
The following is a list of 30 criminal offences that carry the death penalty in Malaysia as of 1 December 2025.

- Waging or attempting to wage war or abetting the waging of war against the Yang di-Pertuan Agong, a Ruler or Yang di-Pertua Negeri – Section 121 Penal Code (see: Al-Ma'unah and 2013 Lahad Datu standoff)
- Offences against the person of the Yang di-Pertuan Agong, Ruler or Yang di-Pertua Negeri – Section 121A Penal Code
- Committing terrorist acts – Section 130C Penal Code
- Directing activities of terrorist groups, if the act results in death – Section 130I Penal Code
- Providing or collecting property for terrorist acts, if the act results in death – Section 130N Penal Code
- Providing services for terrorist purposes, if the act results in death – Section 130O Penal Code
- Accepting gratification to facilitate or enable terrorist acts, if the act results in death – Section 130QA Penal Code
- Accepting gratification to facilitate or enable organized criminal activity, if the act results in death – Section 130ZB Penal Code
- Abetment of mutiny within Malaysian Armed Forces, if mutiny is committed in consequence thereof – Section 132 Penal Code
- Giving or fabricating false evidence with intent to procure conviction of a capital offence – Section 194 Penal Code
- Murder – Section 302 Penal Code (see: Mona Fandey)
- Abetment of suicide of child or insane person – Section 305 Penal Code
- Hostage-taking resulting in death – Section 374A Penal Code (see: Pudu Prison siege)
- Rape resulting in death – Section 376(4) Penal Code
- Gang-robbery with murder – Section 396 Penal Code
- Trafficking in dangerous drugs – Section 39B Dangerous Drugs Act 1952 (see: Barlow and Chambers execution)
- Export, transhipment and transit of strategic items and unlisted items, if the act results in death – Section 9 Strategic Trade Act 2010
- Provision of technical assistance for restricted activity, if the act results in death – Section 10(2)(a) Strategic Trade Act 2010
- Brokering of strategic items, if the act results in death – Section 11(2)(a)(i) Strategic Trade Act 2010
- Transactions involving unlisted items and restricted activities, if the act results in death – Section 12(4)(a)(i)(A) Strategic Trade Act 2010
- Aiding the enemy – Section 38 Armed Forces Act 1972
- Communication with the enemy – Section 41(1) Armed Forces Act 1972
- Mutiny – Section 47(1) Armed Forces Act 1972
- Failure to suppress mutiny, if the offence was committed with intent to assist the enemy – Section 48(i) Armed Forces Act 1972
- Civil offences committed by member of the armed forces, if the corresponding civil offence is treason – Section 88(3)(a) Armed Forces Act 1972
- Civil offences committed by member of the armed forces, if the corresponding civil offence is murder – Section 88(3)(b) Armed Forces Act 1972
- Offence of contamination of water, if the act results in death – Section 121(2)(a) Water Services Industry Act 2006
- Prohibition of nuclear weapons – Section 25H Atomic Energy Act 1984
- Conducting activity involving radioactive material or nuclear material with intention to cause death – Section 41D(1) Atomic Energy Act 1984
- Sabotage – Section 41E(1)(a) Atomic Energy Act 1984

=== Offences previously punishable with death ===
The following list of criminal offences are offences that previously carry death penalty, but have since been amended or repealed, and are either no longer an offence or no longer carries death penalty as of 4 July 2023.

==== Amended offences ====
- Attempt to murder while under a life sentence, if hurt is caused – Section 307(2) Penal Code
- Kidnapping or abducting in order to murder – Section 364 Penal Code
- Discharging a firearm in the commission of a scheduled offence – Section 3 Firearms (Increased Penalties) Act 1971
- Being an accomplice in case of discharge of firearm – Section 3A Firearms (Increased Penalties) Act 1971
- Trafficking in firearms – Section 7 Firearms (Increased Penalties) Act 1971
- Manufacturing arms or ammunition without licence and breach of conditions of licence – Section 14 Arms Act 1960
- Abduction, wrongful restraint or wrongful confinement for ransom – Section 3(1) Kidnapping Act 1961

The death penalty for the 7 offences listed above were abolished by the Abolition of Mandatory Death Penalty Act 2023, and were substituted with 30 to 40 years imprisonment plus not less than 12 strokes of whipping, with effect from 4 July 2023.

==== Repealed offences ====
- Offences in security areas for possession of firearm, ammunition and explosives – Section 57(1) Internal Security Act 1960 (see: Botak Chin)
- Consorting with person carrying or having possession of arms or explosives in security areas – Section 58(1) Internal Security Act 1960

The Internal Security Act 1960 which contains the 2 offences above has been repealed and replaced by the Security Offences (Special Measures) Act 2012, with effect from 31 July 2012.

=== Rules and procedures regarding death sentence ===
Only High Courts had jurisdiction in capital cases. Appeals to the Court of Appeal and the Federal Court are automatic. The last resort for the convicted is to plead pardon for clemency. Pardons or clemency were granted by the Ruler or Yang di-Pertua Negeri (Governor) of the state where the crime was committed or the Yang di-Pertuan Agong if the crime was committed in the Federal Territories or when involving members of the armed forces. Death sentences were carried out by hanging as provided in Section 277 of the Criminal Procedure Code.

Pregnant women and minors may not be sentenced to death. In lieu of the death penalty, women pregnant at the time of sentencing would have their sentences reduced to life imprisonment as provided by Section 275 of the Criminal Procedure Code, while juvenile offenders would be detained at the pleasure of the Ruler, Governor or Yang di-Pertuan Agong depending on where the crime was committed as provided by the Child Act 2001.

=== Dangerous Drugs Act ===
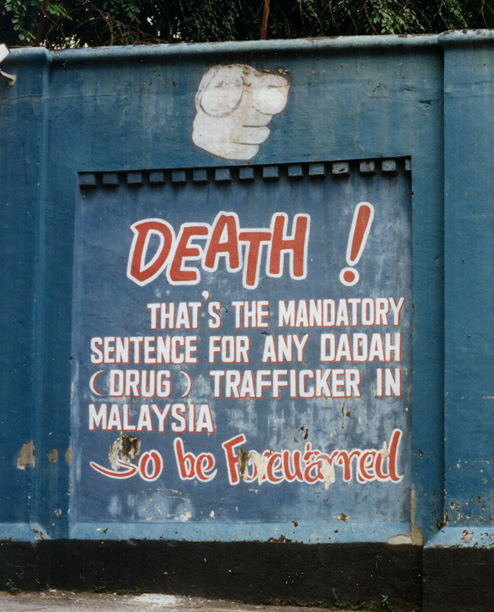
Mural at the now-demolished Pudu Prison, taken in 1999. It was demolished along with the prison in 2010 to make way for the BBCC development.

The death penalty for drug trafficking was made mandatory in 1983. The main reason for this was because drug trafficking was seen as one of the national challenges of the country. Since then, there has been a relaxation on this rule as death penalties may sometimes be substituted with a lighter sentence which includes mandatory whippings, forced rehabilitation or preventive detention.

The presumption is that a person would be considered to be trafficking drugs if they were in possession of a certain amount of dangerous drugs. Under section 39B of the Dangerous Drugs Act, those in possession of 15 g or more heroin and morphine; 1,000 g or more opium (raw or prepared); 200 g or more cannabis; and 40 g or more cocaine will receive the mandatory death sentence. The courts have affirmed that to establish prima facie drug trafficking, it has to be shown that the accused party was in actual possession of the drug and that the person has to have knowledge that they were in possession of the dangerous drug. Once the death sentence has been passed, the sentence shall be passed on to the chief minister of the state where the judgment was given where a note about the evidence used in the case and a report about the judges opinion of the sentence would be included. The minister then has a choice of either fixing a time and place for the execution to be carried out or may substitute in a lesser punishment if the minister wishes.

The courts though have noted the severity of the sentence and in several instances have tried to impose a lower sentence where possible. One of the methods employed by the court would be to ensure that the procedures set out for the sentence have been strictly adhered to by the prosecution. The court in that case paid close attention to the evidence presented to ensure that the judgment made was the right one. The court has also acquitted a person when the reported amount of drugs seized was only slightly different from the amount of drugs received by the forensics lab chemist. The difference in amount was 10.21 grams.

There have also been suggestions by those in the executive for a re-appeal of the death sentence for drug trafficking. The Law Minister in 2012 held that the government may replace the death sentence with an imprisonment term instead in recognition that such a sentence only punishes the drug mules and not those higher up in the chain. There was also the fact that the death penalty does not seem to have the deterring effect that such a penalty was hoped to create, thus questioning the need for the penalty for that particular offence.

== Notable cases of people sentenced to death ==
=== Murder cases ===
- Sunny Ang, a Singaporean who murdered his girlfriend Jenny Cheok during a scuba diving trip in the waters of Sisters' Islands, Singapore in August 1963 when Singapore was still a part of Malaysia. The crime shocked both Singapore and Malaysia as the first case of murder without a body in both countries, and Ang was subsequently convicted and sentenced to death by the High Court of Singapore for murder in May 1965 solely based on circumstantial evidence and without Cheok's body. Ang was eventually hanged in Singapore's Changi Prison on 6 February 1967, after Singapore's independence from Malaysia.
- Tan Kheng Ann and another 17 members out of the 58 detainees charged with killing four prison officers during the Pulau Senang prison riots on 12 July 1963. These 18 men were found guilty of murder in March 1964 by the High Court of Singapore in the largest trial ever held in both Singapore and Malaysia, and a year later, on 29 October 1965, two months and twenty days after Singapore separated from Malaysia, the 18 men were hanged at Singapore's Changi Prison.
- Lee Chee Wai, an air conditioner repairman hanged on 18 January 1984 for the 1981 murder of Laura Yap Fui Kheng in Petaling Jaya.
- Zainuzzaman Mohamad Jasadi, who was charged with the double murder of Intan Yusniza Mohamad Yunos and her adoptive mother Haniza Ismail in 1991. Although he was acquitted of murdering Haniza, Zainuzzaman was convicted of the other charge of killing Intan and sentenced to death in August 1992. Zainuzzaman was hanged on 5 October 2001.
- Mona Fandey, a Malaysian singer, vocalist, murderer, and witchcraft supporter. She was executed next to her husband and with another accomplice on 2 November 2001.
- Ariffin Agas, a security guard from Kuala Lipis, Pahang who was hanged on 27 December 2002 for the 1992 Jalan Turi murders of two Indian-American boys and their domestic maid.
- Hanafi Mat Hassan, a bus driver found guilty of murdering Noor Suzaily Mukhtar after he raped and sodomized her in 2000. He was hanged on 19 December 2008.
- Brothers Ramesh and Sasivarnam Jayakumar along with Gunasegar Pitchaymuthu were convicted of murder and executed on 25 March 2016 by hanging. This execution was conducted in secret, and their families were only given two days notice before the men were hanged.
- 40-year-old Ahmad Najib Aris, a former aircraft cleaning supervisor who was executed on 23 September 2016, by hanging for murdering IT consultant Canny Ong.
- Sirul Azhar Umar, one of the two police officers found guilty of the 2006 murder of Shaariibuugiin Altantuyaa and sentenced to death in 2009. Although his sentence and conviction overturned upon appeal, the Federal Court reinstated the death penalty on Sirul and his co-accused after finding them guilty of murder and allowing the prosecution's appeal. However, Sirul fled Malaysia and headed for Australia, but he was not deported as Australia had a policy to not send fugitives back to countries where they face the death penalty.
- Muidin Maidin, who was convicted of the 2012 murder of four-year-old Nurul Nadirah Abdullah, better known as Dirang. He was sentenced to hang in 2013.
- N. Pathmanabhan, T. Thilaiyagan, and R. Kathavarayan, the three convicts found guilty and sentenced to death in 2013 for murdering 47-year-old cosmetics millionaire Datuk Sosilawati Lawiya and her three male associates – bank officer Noorhisham Mohamad, driver Kamaruddin Shamsuddin and lawyer Ahmad Kamil Abdul Karim – in 2010 before burning their bodies. This was Malaysia's second case of murder convictions in the absence of a body. A fourth man R. Matan was also originally convicted and given the death penalty for the murders, but later set free after he was cleared of all charges by the Federal Court.
- Koong Swee Kwan, who was sentenced to death in 2014 for the murder of banker Hussain Najadi
- Shahril Jaafar, the son of a Datuk businessman and car dealer who was sentenced to death in 2015 for the 2006 rape and murder of Chee Gaik Yap. He remains on death row as of 2024.
- Rabidin Satir, a Sabah-born serial killer and rapist who was given two death sentences for the 2009 rape-murder of Annie Kok Yin Cheng and 2012 murder of Khairul Hazri Jamaludin.
- Zulkipli Abdullah, who was convicted of the 2014 Kuching double murder and sentenced to death in 2015
- Kher Tian Hock, who was convicted of the 2004 murder of See Sheau Fang and sentenced to death in 2015
- Izwanuddin Kasim, who was found guilty of the 2014 murder of Yong Boon Cheong and sentenced to death in 2017.
- Mohamad Fitri Pauzi, who was found guilty of the 2016 murder of Bill Kayong, a social rights activist and PKR politician and sentenced to death in 2018.
- Hazmi Majid, a barber sentenced to death in 2021 for murdering a 11-month-old baby girl nicknamed "Zara" after he sexually abused her.
- Satvender Singh, a lorry driver, was found guilty for murdering both his wife and 7-month-old daughter by the High Court in 2021. However his charge of murdering his daughter was later acquitted by the Court of Appeal and the murder conviction for killing his wife was replaced with culpable homicide not amounting to murder and 20 years jail. In 2025, the Federal Court reinstated all murder convictions against him and sentenced him to death.

=== Firearm cases ===
- Botak Chin, a Malaysian criminal and gangster who was convicted of possession of firearms and armed robbery, and he was sentenced to death for the capital crime of possessing firearms. He was hanged on 11 June 1981, at the age of 30.
- Jimmy Chua Chap Seng, a Singaporean ex-policeman who masterminded the Pudu Prison siege in 1986. Chua was sentenced to death for unlawfully possessing a gun and six bullets in a separate case and hanged on 10 October 1989 at Pudu Prison.
- Sim Kie Chon, a Malaysian man executed by hanging on 4 March 1986 for unlawful possession of firearms after failing three bids to commute his death sentence to life imprisonment.

=== Drug trafficking cases ===
- Barlow and Chambers execution, the first two Westerners hanged in independent Malaysia on 7 July 1986.
- Derrick Gregory, a British labourer who was executed on 21 July 1989 by hanging, for drug trafficking offences.
- Eight Hong Kong citizens (Hau Tsui Ling, Wong Kwok Chung, Au King Chor, Chan Yiu Tim, Yuen Kwok Kwan, Li Chi Ping, Ip Tak Ming, Ng Yiu Kwok) were put to death by hanging in Malaysia's largest mass execution for drug offences at dawn on 30 May 1990, after being convicted and sentenced to death for the joint enterprise of attempting to smuggle 12.7 kgs of heroin (hidden in five suitcases) to Brussels via Penang International Airport in October 1982
- Michael McAuliffe, Australian drug smuggler and barman executed in 1993.
- Sangeeta Sharma Brahmacharimayum, an Indian beautician sentenced to death for smuggling 1,637.1g of methamphetamine in October 2016.
- Muhammad Lukman, whose death sentence for distributing Cannabis extract for medical purposes sparked public outcry when highlighted by The Star editor Martin Vengadesan in his column. This led to a national review of both the Death Penalty and drug laws

=== Waging war against the King ===
- Mohamed Amin Mohamed Razali, Zahit Muslim, Jamaluddin Darus and Jemari Jusoh, the four members of the Al-Ma'unah who were convicted and sentenced to death for their roles in the Sauk Siege of 2000. Mohamed Amin was hanged on 4 August 2006 at Sungai Buloh Prison while the remaining three were executed a week earlier
- Datu Amirbahar Hushin Kiram, 54, Julham Rashid, 70, Virgilio Nemar Patulada @ Mohammad, 53, Salib Akhmad Emali, 64, Tani Lahad Dahi, 64, Basah H. Manuel, 42, Ismail Yasin, 77, Atik Hussin Abu Bakar, 46, and Al-Wazir Osman, 61 are nine Filipino terrorists convicted of waging war against the Yang di-Pertuan Agong during the 2013 Lahad Datu incursion. They were sentenced to death by the Court of Appeal in June 2016, and their death sentence was subsequently upheld by the Federal Court of Malaysia in 2018. After the passing of Abolition of Mandatory Death Penalty Act 2023, seven of them filed an application for a review on their death sentence, but it was unanimously rejected by the Federal Court on 2 October 2024. Two of them, namely Ismail Yasin and Salib Akhmad Emali, did not file for a review as they have died while in prison.

== Notable cases where a death sentence was commuted or overturned ==
- 42-year-old New Zealand citizen Lorraine Cohen and her 18-year-old son Aaron Shelton were arrested in the departure lounge of Penang International Airport in 1985 after narcotics were discovered hidden in their underwear. In 1987, Cohen was found guilty of trafficking 140 grams of heroin and sentenced to death, while her son was sentenced to life in prison for trafficking 34 grams of heroin. Both appealed their convictions in 1989 and Cohen had her sentence commuted to life imprisonment after successfully arguing she was a long time addict and the drugs were for her own use only, while her son's original sentence was upheld. In 1996 both were pardoned and released from prison.
- American woman Brenda Ferguson was arrested in 1994 for smuggling drugs into the country. She was sentenced to death and her sentence was reduced a year later.
- Maria Elvira Pinto Exposto, an Australian, was arrested in December 2014 in Kuala-Lumpur Airport while in transit and was found to be in possession of 1.1 kg of crystal methamphetamine. She faced a mandatory death penalty, was acquitted by the court, but the prosecutors appealed. The appeal court vacated the acquittal decision, and in May 2018 she was sentenced to death. On 26 November 2019, the Malaysian Federal Court acquitted her and ordered an immediate release.
- Teh Kim Hong, a former hairstylist sentenced to death for the 2008 kidnapping and murder of Lai Ying Xin, a 16-year-old schoolgirl in Kulai, Johor. Teh's death sentence was upheld in 2013 and 2015 by the Court of Appeal and Federal Court respectively, but after the 2023 abolition of mandatory death sentences, Teh successfully appealed to reduce his death sentence to 40 years' imprisonment and 17 strokes of the cane in May 2024.
- Poon Wai Hong, who was originally sentenced to death in 2018 for the 2013 murder of Ng Yuk Tim, was found guilty of a lesser charge of manslaughter after filing an appeal in 2019 and his death sentence was reduced to 22 years' jail.
- Mokhtar Hashim, a former politician found guilty of the murder of a political rival in 1982 and sentenced to death. The death sentence was later commuted to life imprisonment, and in 1991, Mokhtar was granted a royal pardon and released from jail.
- Low Kian Boon, who, at age 18, committed the murder of German-born Australian businessman Hans Herzog in 2003. Low was originally convicted of manslaughter by the High Court and given a prison sentence of ten years before the Court of Appeal allowed the prosecution's appeal and sentenced Low to death for the original charge of murder, a decision that was ultimately upheld by the Federal Court. Low's death sentence was commuted to 35 years' jail and 12 strokes of the cane on 28 March 2024 after the 2023 abolition of mandatory death sentences.
- Mohammad Awari Ahmad, a former sawmill worker found guilty of the 2015 rape and murder of Yashmin Fauzi, a nurse and mother of three in Kelantan. Mohammad Awari was sentenced to death in 2018, but his death sentence was commuted to 40 years' jail and 12 strokes of the cane in 2024.
- Karthigesu Sivapakiam, who was originally sentenced to hang for the 1979 murder of his sister-in-law Jean Perera Sinnappa, before he was acquitted after a prosecution witness admitted to lying about Karthigesu being the killer of Jean Perera
- Azilah Hadri, one of the two police officers found guilty of the 2006 murder of Shaariibuugiin Altantuyaa and sentenced to death in 2009. Although Azilah's death sentence and conviction was overturned upon appeal, the Federal Court reinstated the death penalty on both Azilah and his co-accused after finding them guilty of murder and allowing the prosecution's appeal. His death sentence was converted to a jail term of 40 years and 12 strokes of the cane on 10 October 2024.
- Ja'afar Halid, a bodyguard who shot dead his boss, Datuk Ong Teik Kwong at the Dr Lim Chong Eu Expressway in Penang with his Glock 19 pistol, was convicted of murder and sentenced to death by the High Court on 16 December 2020. His conviction and death sentence were overturned when the Court of Appeal on 20 November 2023 found him legally insane and ordered him to be held at a mental hospital. Upon prosecution's appeal, the Federal Court on 7 November 2024 reinstated his murder conviction but instead sentenced him to 35 years imprisonment and 24 strokes of whipping.
- Razali Ahmad, who was sentenced to death for trafficking 851 g of cannabis in 2000 and has been on death row for 21 years, was commuted to 30 years imprisonment and 12 strokes of whipping by the Federal Court in November 2023 after he filed for a review on his death sentence following the abolition of all mandatory death penalty in Malaysia in 2023. He completed his caning sentence in Kajang Prison and was subsequently released in April 2024. His mother, Siti Zabidah Mohammad Rasyid, who was interviewed by Al Jazeera's 101 East documentary in 2019 and Reuters in 2023, has persistently called for a second chance be given for her son prior to Razali's commutation in 2023.
- K. Sathiaraj, a homeless man and former lorry attendant found guilty of raping, sodomizing and murdering an 85-year-old woman in 2019. He was sentenced to death after a trial in August 2022, but the death sentence was reduced to 40 years in jail and 12 strokes of the cane in January 2025 after an appeal.
- Muhammad Akmal Zuhairi Azmal, Muhammad Azamuddin Mad Sofi, Muhammad Najib Mohd Razi, Muhammad Afif Najmudin Azahat, Mohamad Shobirin Sabri and Abdoul Hakeem Mohd Ali, the six former students of military university UPNM were found guilty of the 2017 murder of Zulfarhan Osman Zulkarnain, a student and cadet officer of the same university. All six were sentenced to death in 2024 by the Court of Appeal, but their murder convictions were later overturned by the Federal Court in 2025 and were instead sentenced to 18 years imprisonment for culpable homicide not amounting to murder.

== See also ==
- Abolition of Mandatory Death Penalty Act 2023
- Capital punishment in Singapore
- Crime in Malaysia
- Judiciary of Malaysia
- Law of Malaysia
- Revision of Sentence of Death and Imprisonment for Natural Life Act 2023
