= Ariffin =

Ariffin is a Malaysian name. Notable people with this name include:

- Ariffin Abdul Wahab, Bruneian military officer
- Ariffin Agas, Malaysian convicted murderer
- Ariffin Mohammed, Malaysian cult leader known as Ayah Pin
- Ariffin Omar, Malaysian politician
- Ariffin Ramly, Malaysian cricketer
- Azim Azami Ariffin, Malaysian lawn bowler
- Azizan Ariffin, Malaysian military officer
- Kamarul Ariffin bin Mohamad Yassin, Malaysian scout
- Nora Ariffin, Singaporean model
- Ross Ariffin, Malaysian composer
- Wan Aishah Wan Ariffin, Malaysian singer, actress and politician
- Zakaria Ariffin, Malaysian playwright, theater director and educator
- Muhammad Syamsul Ariffin bin Brahim (born 1983), Singaporean gang member of Salakau and fugitive on the run for murder since 31 May 2001
