= Brunger =

Brunger is a surname. Notable people with the surname include:

- Aidan Brunger (died 2014), British medical student murdered by Zulkipli Abdullah
- Axel T. Brunger (born 1956), German American biophysicist
