= Murder of Hans Herzog =

2003 murder of a German-born Australian businessman in Malaysia

- Murder victim Hans Herzog
- Location: 03.35°N 101.35°E; USJ, Subang Jaya, Selangor, Malaysia
- Date: 12 November 2003; 22 years ago
- Attack type: Slashing
- Weapon: Parang knife
- Victim: Hans Herzog
- Convictions: Manslaughter (2003); Murder (2006)
- Convicted: Low Kian Boon; Tan Pei Yan

On 12 November 2003, 59-year-old Hans Herzog, a German-born Australian businessman, was found dead with multiple slash and stab wounds to his neck, head and hands at his residence at USJ, Subang Jaya near Kuala Lumpur, Malaysia. Herzog, whose wife was Malaysian, was said to have been killed by two teenage boys (aged 17 and 18 respectively) allegedly hired by his two teenage stepdaughters, who resented him for alleged domestic abuse. The four teenagers were arrested and charged with murder.

Although Herzog's stepdaughters were acquitted of abetting the killing, the two boys - Low Kian Boon (刘健文 Líu Jiánwén) and Tan Pei Yan - were found guilty of manslaughter in 2006 and sentenced to ten years' jail each by the Shah Alam High Court. However, after the prosecution filed an appeal, the Court of Appeal found the boys guilty of murder in 2009, and since Low was 18 years old while Tan was 17 at the time of the offence, Low was sentenced to death while Tan was detained indefinitely for 11 years before he was released in September 2020 on a royal pardon.

After he was handed the death penalty in 2009, Low was held on death row for 15 years before his death sentence was commuted to 35 years in jail and 12 strokes of the cane in March 2024, after Malaysia abolished the mandatory death penalty a year prior in 2023 and enabled anyone convicted of murder to face either a death sentence or a jail term of 30 to 40 years.

== Background ==
Hans Herzog was an Australian citizen originally from Germany. In 1993, he moved from Victoria to Malaysia. He married Low Yoke Yoke from Sarawak in 2000, becoming the stepfather of her two daughters, Ku Sue Yin (aged 14 in 2003) and Ku Sue Kin (aged 16 in 2003). At the time of his death, Herzog lived at Taman Subang Mewah, the 1st section of UEP Subang Jaya (USJ), an affluent suburb of Kuala Lumpur, working as a self-employed business owner in Klang.

== Murder investigation ==
On 12 November 2003, past midnight Herzog and his wife were about to go to bed when they heard strange sounds coming from outside, and Herzog's wife went out to check, and she saw a suspicious person inside the bedroom of her younger daughter Ku Sue Yin. Low Yoke Yoke informed her husband about it, and her husband told her to stay inside the room first while he went out to investigate. Shortly afterward, Herzog's wife heard him shouting, and he approached her with a severe slash wound on his face, telling her to call the police. Herzog left the room again while his wife stayed inside.

A few minutes later, Herzog's elder stepdaughter Ku Sue Kin knocked on her door and informed her that Herzog was unconscious at the bottom of the stairs, and laid motionless in a pool of blood. Herzog was later confirmed to have died when the police and paramedics arrived, and a post-mortem examination showed he had succumbed to 23 slash wounds inflicted with a sharp instrument, presumed to be a parang, and Herzog died as a result of multiple slash wounds on his neck and head. The police recovered a bloodstained parang left abandoned on the sill of a window in the house, which was assumed to be the murder weapon used to kill Herzog. It was also assumed that the attackers entered and left the house through the same window.

However, it became apparent that Herzog's younger stepdaughter was nowhere to be seen in the house when the murder happened, and hence, the police sent out a public appeal for her whereabouts.

17 hours after the murder itself, a 17-year-old secondary school student surrendered himself to the police. The student, who later took his final year SPM national examinations while in police custody, confessed that he received a stolen sum of RM1,100 from the Ku sisters, who stole the money from their stepfather, and after this, he and an 18-year-old friend armed themselves with parangs to attack Herzog, allegedly under the instruction of the sisters, and the juvenile also claimed to have swallowed psychotropic pills before and after attacking the businessman. This revelation led to the immediate arrest of the Ku sisters, and further investigations revealed that the sisters were unhappy with their stepfather for allegedly being overtly controlling towards them and mistreating them. The juvenile's 18-year-old friend was eventually arrested on 16 November 2003. Several other youths were arrested, but they were not indicted in the end.

On 22 November 2003, Herzog's two stepdaughters Ku Su Yin (aged 14) and Ku Su Kin (aged 16) and two teenage boys – 18-year-old private college student Low Kian Boon and 17-year-old secondary school student Tan Pei Yan – were officially charged with the murder of 59-year-old Hans Herzog. Although the names of the stepdaughters and 17-year-old Tan were listed in the official court documents and initial media reports, later media reports were given a gag order to not report further the names of the minors involved. Under Malaysian law, any offenders found guilty of murder would face the mandatory death penalty.

== Trial proceedings ==
On 19 August 2004, the trial of Low Kian Boon, Tan Pei Yan and Herzog's two stepdaughters began at the Shah Alam High Court. The prosecution was led by Salim Soib, while for the defence, leading criminal lawyer Karpal Singh and his son Ramkarpal Singh both represented the sisters together; Raymond Yap and Joseph Tan represented Low and Tan was defended by four lawyers (V. Ananth Namasivayam, Jagjit Singh, Sarjit Singh Sidhu, and Manjeet Singh Dhillon). The trial was presided over by Justice Datuk K. N. Segara.

The prosecution's case was that the Ku sisters, who were resentful towards their stepfather for allegedly abusing them and being too strict and controlling towards them in their lives, had informed the boys their grievances and hence, they helped the boys to commit the murder of Herzog, with Low Kian Boon, the only adult of the four, acting as the ringleader of this murderous scheme, which was executed successfully with the juvenile and Low entering the sisters' house and slashing Herzog to death with parangs. Several prosecution witnesses were summoned to court, and out of these witnesses, one of them was the cashier of a Subang Jaya hardware store, who testified that he saw Low and Tan purchasing two parangs from his shop, and the bloodstained parangs recovered during investigations matched to the ones bought from the store, and they were assumed to be the murder weapons used during the attack. Another witness was an acquaintance of Tan, who told the court that Tan informed him about beating up a person but Tan himself admitted that he feared that the person he attacked had died, and Tan also admitted at the first instance to the police that he killed Herzog. Karpal Singh and his fellow counsel sought to argue that the Ku sisters were not involved in the killing of their stepfather because there was no direct evidence adduced by the prosecution to link the two of them to the murder itself.

At the close of the prosecution's case on 6 February 2006, the trial judge acquitted the Ku sisters without calling for their defence, after he found that there was insufficient evidence linking the sisters to their stepfather's murder, and the prosecution failed to substantiate a prima facie case against the sisters. As such, Herzog's stepdaughters were fully discharged and acquitted of the murder charges. This decision came as a surprise to both the Ku sisters, who both hugged each other and expressed relief, and they reportedly told the press they wanted to continue their studies.

On the other hand, both Low Kian Boon and Tan Pei Yan were ordered to enter their defence after the trial court ruled that a prima facie case was made out against the pair. In his defence, Low denied that he was the one who planned the murder and denied that he was at the crime scene. He claimed that it was a gangster named "Ivan" who instructed him and Tan to attack Herzog. Low said that while he only wanted to help the sisters, the younger of whom was his girlfriend, Ivan had taken charge of planning the murder after hearing that the sisters were allegedly molested and mistreated by Herzog, so as to get back at Herzog. The existence of Ivan was a huge point of dispute during the trial, as while the defence insisted that Ivan did exist, the prosecution sought to argue that Low had concocted lies about Ivan and stated that there was no such person in real life, and Low denied that he conjured a fictitious person like Ivan to deflect blame from himself, and tried calling a witness to prove that Ivan indeed existed, although the witness's credibility was attacked in court. As for Tan, even though he confessed at first to the murder, he raised a similar defence as Low and also testified about his relationship with the mysterious Ivan.

On 8 April 2006, Justice Datuk K. N. Segara delivered his verdict. He stated that on the facts presented to him, he was not convinced that Low and Tan were absent from the scene at the time of the murder since the DNA tests confirmed that they had stains of Herzog's blood on their clothes they wore at the house on the day in question. Justice Segara rejected the defence's account that "Ivan" was the real culprit of this murderous episode, as he found it not credible. He also found that Low, who was involved with Herzog's younger stepdaughter, had the motive to attack Herzog on the account that she claimed to be abused by Herzog, and that both Low and Tan were substantially involved in the crime with the intent to attack Herzog. However, he stopped short of finding the duo guilty of murder since there was doubt as to whoever inflicted the fatal injuries and whether the lethal injuries inflicted were intentional or not, and found no specific intention to commit murder on the duo's parts. As such, Justice Segara found both 20-year-old Tan Pei Yan and 21-year-old Low Kian Boon guilty of a lesser charge of manslaughter.

On 25 April 2006, both Tan and Low were each sentenced to ten years' imprisonment, with effect from the date of their arrests in November 2003. Given that both Low and Tan served with good behaviour while behind bars, they both became eligible for parole after completing at least-two thirds of their sentence and were set to be released in February 2010.

== Prosecution's appeal ==
The prosecution appealed to the Court of Appeal against the youths' conviction, and sought to have the duo convicted of murder as originally charged. During the hearing, Tan was represented by Karpal Singh (who represented the Ku sisters during the trial) and Sangeet Kaur Deo, while human rights lawyer Edmund Bon represented Low. The defence counsels of the pair similarly appealed against their convictions, seeking to overturn them on the grounds that they were innocent.

On 7 April 2009, the appellate court's three judges – Justice Datuk Gopal Sri Ram, Justice Datuk Hasan Lah and Justice Datuk Jeffrey Tan Kok Wha – delivered their judgement. Justice Gopal, who pronounced the verdict in court, found that the killing of Hans Herzog was an act of premeditated murder, as the two youths in this case clearly shared the common intention of causing his death, given that regardless of whoever was responsible for causing the fatal wounds, the boys had intentionally and violently inflicted serious injuries on Herzog by using parangs, and the attack itself was not only pre-planned but savage, and resulted in the death of the victim. Taking these above factors into consideration, the appellate court found that the original trial judge had erred in convicting the boys of manslaughter and that the boys should be convicted of murder.

The Court of Appeal therefore set aside the manslaughter convictions and ten-year sentences originally imposed on the pair, and hereby found them guilty of the original charge of murder. However, under the Child Act 2001, given the fact that Tan Pei Yan was 17 years old when the crime of murder was committed in 2003 and he had not reached 18, he was spared the mandatory death penalty and instead, he was sentenced to be indefinitely detained at the pleasure of the Sultan of Selangor. On the contrary, Low Kian Boon was sentenced to death for murdering Herzog since he was 18 at the time of the offence.

Subsequently, the boys appealed to the Federal Court of Malaysia, the highest court of the nation. The Federal Court dismissed the appeals of the boys on 17 March 2010, which thereby finalized the death sentence of Low and the indefinite detention order issued to Tan.

== Fate of the two teenage killers ==
Low Kian Boon (middle, bespectacled), who spent 15 years on death row before the commutation of his death sentence in 2024.

After the Federal Court upheld their conviction, both boys remained in prison since. Out of the pair, Tan Pei Yan served 11 years behind bars before he was granted a royal pardon by the Sultan of Selangor and released in September 2020, nearly 17 years after he was arrested. As for Low Kian Boon, he was incarcerated on death row for 15 years after he was first given the death penalty. During this period, Low appealed to the Yang di-Pertuan Agong for a royal pardon twice, with hopes of commuting his death sentence to life imprisonment. However, he did not receive an official reply from the pardons board and his death sentence was effectively still maintained.

In April 2023, the Malaysian government officially abolished the mandatory death penalty and natural life imprisonment. Under the revised laws, a person found guilty of murder would face either the death penalty or a custodial sentence of 30 to 40 years' imprisonment, with caning for male offenders aged less than 50. All the inmates on death row in Malaysia, including those who had exhausted all avenues of appeal, were given the chance to apply for re-sentencing at the Federal Court of Malaysia. Low was one of the 936 death row prisoners who appealed to commute their sentences.

On 28 March 2024, Low Kian Boon's re-sentencing trial convened at the Federal Court. Edmund Bon, the human rights lawyer who defended Low, argued that Low should be sentenced to jail for 30 to 32 years, stating that Low was 18 years old at the time of the murder and he had been in prison for more than 20 years and he had not received any outcomes for his two clemency petitions. Bon said that the death penalty should be reserved only for the rarest of cases such as serial murders or the rape-murder of infants, and Low's case fell short of the worst cases that were deserving of the death penalty, and he stated that the revisions to the law were meant for judges to have a chance to consider any extenuating circumstances in deciding whether or not death was the appropriate sentence in capital cases. On the other hand, Deputy Public Prosecutor (DPP) Aznee Salmie Ahmad urged the Federal Court to affirm the death penalty, citing that the murder of Hans Herzog was gruesome and the manner of his death was extremely violent, given that Herzog suffered multiple slash wounds and his right hand was nearly amputated.

In the end, the Federal Court's three-member bench chaired by Justice Zabariah Yusof (coupled with Justice Nordin Hassan and Justice Abu Bakar Jais) delivered their decision, sentencing 39-year-old Low Kian Boon to 35 years' imprisonment after they overturned his death sentence. On top of his 35-year jail term, Low was also given 12 strokes of the cane, and his sentence was backdated to the date of his arrest in November 2003. Since Low had already served 20 years and five months in prison, including the approximate 15 years he spent on death row, he would only need to serve another 14 years and seven months before he could be released at the age of 53 in 2038, unless he became eligible for parole on account of good behaviour after completing two-thirds of his jail term (23 years and four months) in 2027.

== Aftermath ==
From September 2017 to April 2018, local Chinese-language newspaper China Press began to publish a special series of real-life crime stories, covering the 30 most horrific crimes that happened in Malaysia since the 1970s and updated every Friday. The murder of Hans Herzog was recorded as the 21st volume of the China Press crime story series.

In June 2024, three months after the re-sentencing of Low, Datuk Seri Azalina Othman Said revealed in Parliament that out of all the 474 death row applications heard in Malaysia between 14 November 2023 and 31 May 2024, there were 19 people on death row, including rapist-murderer Shahril Jaafar and Kuching double killer Zulkipli Abdullah, who failed to have their death sentences reduced while the rest of these offenders, including Low Kian Boon and Teh Kim Hong (who abducted and murdered Lai Ying Xin in 2008), had their sentences of death lowered to jail terms ranging between 30 and 40 years.

== See also ==
- Caning in Malaysia
- Capital punishment in Malaysia
