= Commander-in-Chief of the Malaysian Armed Forces =

Highest-ranking office within the Malaysian Armed Forces

The Supreme Commander or Commander-in-Chief (Malay: Pemerintah Tertinggi, Jawi: ڤمرينته ترتيڠݢي) of the Malaysian Armed Forces is the highest-ranking office in the command structure of the Malaysian military. The office dates to 1957 when the Federation of Malaya (later Malaysia) gained independence. Its current role, duties and powers are regulated by the Constitution of Malaysia and the Armed Forces Act 1972.

== Function and responsibility ==
The Malaysian Constitution establishes that the office of Supreme Commander is attached to the person of the Head of State of Malaysia, namely the Yang di-Pertuan Agong:

- Federal Constitution, Article 41 - The Yang di-Pertuan Agong shall be the Supreme Commander of the Armed Forces of the Federation.

Armed Forces Act 1972 was passed by the Malaysian Parliament in order to consolidate in one law all the regulations governing the three services (Army, Navy and Air Force), it establishes the function and duties of the Head of State in his capacity as Supreme Commander. The Act assigns the following duties to the Supreme Commander in the following sections:

- 5(1): To approve the compositions of the Regular Forces recommended by the Armed Forces Council.
- 5(2): To approve the names of the Armed Forces establishments recommended by the Armed Forces Council.
- 5(5): To approve the disbandment and amalgamation of the compositions and altering of the names of the unites recommended by Armed Forces Council.
- 6: To grant commissions to persons in the regular forces recommended by the Armed Forces Council.
- 7(2): To extend the period of commissions granted.
- 8: To grant honorary commissions in the regular forces to any person.
- 9: To cancel on the recommendation of the Armed Forces Council any commission granted.
- 12(3): To approve promotions recommended by the Armed Forces Council to ranks beyond the ranks of Captain in the Army, Lieutenant in the Navy and Flight Lieutenant in the Air Force.
- 13(1)(b): To approve the transfer recommended by the Armed Forces Council of a commissioned officer or a person appointed under section 10 from one service to another service of the Regular Forces.
- 15: To approve regulations made by the AF Council relating to commissioning, etc. of officers.
- 22(1)(b): To approve the transfer of a serviceman from one service to another of the regular forces recommended by the AF Council.
- 36: To approve regulations made by the AF Council relating to enlistment of persons and matters connected with their employment, etc. in the regular forces.
- 104(3)(c): To appoint convening authorities and revoke such appointments.
- 127(1): To approve death sentences which have been confirmed.
- 128(2)(a): To review finding and sentence of a Court-martial.
- 131(1),(2)and(3): To give directions as to custody where an accused has been found insane.
- 150(1): To appoint a Judge-Advocate-General.

== See also ==
- Malaysian Armed Forces
- Yang di-Pertuan Agong
- Constitution of Malaysia
- Armed Forces Act 1972
