= 2019 Ampang rape and murder =

2019 rape-murder of an 85-year-old woman in Malaysia

Wong Chooi
- Wong Chooi, pictured before her death
- Born: Wong Chooi c. 1934; Malaysia
- Died: 19 September 2019 (aged 85); Jalan Tasik Tambahan, Ampang, Selangor, Malaysia
- Cause of death: Suffocation
- Known for: Rape and murder victim
- Spouse: Unnamed husband (deceased in 2000s)
- Children: Four sons and two daughters

On 19 September 2019, at her flat at Jalan Tasik Tambahan, Ampang in the Malaysian state of Selangor, 85-year-old Wong Chooi (黄翠 Huáng Cuì; 1934 – 19 September 2019) was found dead by her son, and post-mortem examinations revealed that Wong was raped and sodomized before she was murdered. The killer was later identified as K. Sathiaraj (Sathiaraj a/l Kundaiah; born 19 September 1992), a homeless man and former lorry attendant who was previously jailed for drug and property offences, and he was arrested and charged with raping, sodomizing and murdering Wong a month after the crime.

Sathiaraj, who was 27 at the time of the offence, was found guilty of murder and sentenced to death in August 2022, in addition to a 13-year jail term and five strokes of the cane for the second charge of rape. Sathiaraj's appeal was dismissed by the Malaysian Court of Appeal in February 2024, but his death sentence was commuted to 40 years in prison and 12 strokes of the cane by the Federal Court of Malaysia in January 2025.

== Death of Wong Chooi ==
On 19 September 2019, in the Malaysian state of Selangor, an 85-year-old woman was discovered dead inside her flat at Jalan Tasik Tambahan, Ampang.

The victim was identified as 85-year-old Wong Chooi, who lived together with one of her sons, who was not married. Wong's 61-year-old second son (and fourth child) returned home from work to discover his mother's body inside her bedroom, and when her half-naked body was found, Wong's hands were tied together while her head covered with a piece of cloth, and her mouth was taped up with cloth stuffed into her mouth, and her pants were being pulled down. Autopsy reports showed that there were semen marks on the victim's body, suggesting that Wong was likely sexually assaulted before her death, although the police did not conclude that she had been raped.

As part of the preliminary investigations, Wong's 61-year-old second son was arrested. The arrest of Wong's son brought shock to the family, and according to Wong's third son (who last saw his mother on Chinese New Year that same year), he refused to believe that his brother was the killer as his brother was a kind person. Another relative also stated that Wong's youngest son was a dutiful and filial son who shared a close relationship with his mother, and he took care of his mother's daily needs, and there was no quarrels happening between Wong and her son, who was the only one out of his siblings that remained single. At the time of her death, Wong, who was certified to have died by suffocation due to gagging, left behind three sons and one daughter. Wong's husband died more than ten years prior to her murder, and the couple's eldest son and eldest daughter were also deceased by the time their mother was murdered. Wong was revealed to have suffered from mild dementia, but she was still capable of taking care of herself, and was known to be a devout Buddhist and normally a polite and warm-hearted person.

After his arrest, Wong's son was detained in police custody to assist in investigations, but was granted a temporary release on 22 September to pay his final respects to his mother at the funeral wake of Wong, which was held at the funeral parlour of Kwong Tong Cemetery. Wong's remains were later cremated on the same day.

== Identification of killer and arrest ==
After further investigations, by early October 2019, the police released Wong's son after they confirmed that he was not involved in the rape and murder of his mother. Shortly after, on 9 October 2019, the police managed to match the fingerprints and DNA left at the scene to one suspect, who was found to be previously convicted of drug consumption and housebreaking on three occasions. The suspect, a 27-year-old former lorry attendant named K. Sathiaraj (Sathiaraj a/l Kundaiah), nicknamed Eno, was placed on the police's wanted list and wanted posters were released, with the police's public appeal for his whereabouts in order to arrest him. The police also released a public statement, explaining why they detained Wong's son, as they received information from neighbours that arguments allegedly came from Wong's flat and Wong's second son actually had 16 previous convictions for unspecified offences before the murder, which made them detain Wong's son in order to verify if he was guilty or innocent of the crime.

On 10 October 2019, a day after the police publicized a warrant for his arrest, Sathiaraj was arrested at Bandar Puchong Jaya following a tip-off to the police. Sathiaraj was tested positive for methamphetamine, and the police probed the family of Wong, none of whom knew Sathiaraj prior to the murder. Sathiaraj, who was homeless at the time of the offence, was detained for at least a week to assist in investigations.

It was confirmed 11 days later that Sathiaraj would be charged with the sodomy, rape and murder of Wong Chooi. It was confirmed by police investigators at this stage that Wong was allegedly killed by Sathiaraj after he raped and sodomized her.

On 22 October 2019, 27-year-old K. Sathiaraj was arraigned for one count of murder, one count of carnal intercourse and one count of rape at a magistrate's court in Ampang. If Sathiaraj was found guilty of the murder of Wong Chooi under Section 302 of the Penal Code, he would be sentenced to death. Both Section 376 (1) and Section 377C of the Penal Code provides for a sentence of not less than five years and not more than 20 years in jail, in addition to caning. Sathiaraj was not allowed bail, and he was therefore remanded in prison while awaiting trial. He reportedly did not plead guilty to the charges.

== Trial of K. Sathiaraj ==
K. Sathiaraj

On 2 December 2021, K. Sathiaraj stood trial at the Shah Alam High Court for the rape and murder of 85-year-old Wong Chooi. Sathiaraj pleaded guilty to the charges of sodomy and rape, but he pleaded not guilty and claimed trial for the final charge of murder. Sathiaraj was therefore convicted and sentenced to 13 years' imprisonment and five strokes of the cane by Justice Datuk Ab Karim Ab Rahman, the same judge who presided over his murder trial, which oversaw 19 prosecution witnesses and one defence witness summoned to court to testify. Defence lawyer Saladin Mohd Yasin represented Sathiraj while the prosecution was led by Deputy Public Prosecutor Heikal Ismail.

The trial court was told that on the date of the murder, Sathiaraj had broken into Wong's flat to commit robbery, and in furtherance of the robbery bid, Sathiaraj restrained Wong by tying her hands up and also taped up her mouth and stuffed cloth inside her mouth to prevent her from screaming. Sathiaraj also reportedly proceeded to rape Wong and perform carnal intercourse on Wong, who suffocated and later died as a result. Sathiaraj stole a gold chain after raping and sodomising the elderly woman, and after committing the crime, Sathiaraj met up with a friend and since he did not have an identity card, Sathiaraj entrusted the friend to help him pawn the gold chain. Sathiaraj was called to enter his defence in the middle of his trial, and he tried to argue that he was under the influence of drugs at the time of the murder, which led to him suffering from diminished responsibility, and he claimed he was not fully conscious of his actions when the crime happened.

On 26 August 2022, Justice Datuk Ab Karim Ab Rahman delivered his verdict. In his judgement, Justice Ab Karim said Sathiaraj had the intention of hurting Wong and in turn committed the murder while under a conscious state of mind. He noted that Sathiaraj had no difficulty in remembering and recounting the incident, and understood his own intention of breaking into Wong's house to rob her and tying up her hands, and Sathiaraj's decision to steal a gold chain after raping and sodomizing Wong corroborated his full awareness of the crime. Justice Ab Karim also pointed out in his ruling that Sathiaraj pleaded guilty to rape and sodomy while finding that Sathiaraj's mental responsibility was not impaired at the time of the murder, which arose as a result of Sathiaraj's actions of sealing Wong's mouth with tape and cloth, which directly led to Wong's death by suffocation.

Therefore, 30-year-old K. Sathiaraj was found guilty of murder, and sentenced to death by hanging.

== Appeals and commutation of death sentence ==
In April 2023, eight months after Sathiaraj was sentenced to hang, the Malaysian government officially abolished both natural life imprisonment and the mandatory death penalty. Under the revised laws, anyone convicted of murder would face either the death sentence or a lengthy jail term ranging between 30 and 40 years. At the time when the mandatory death penalty was abolished, Sathiaraj's appeal was pending before the Court of Appeal.

On 27 February 2024, a hearing convened before the Court of Appeal, and during the court session, Sathiaraj's lawyers Hasshahari Johari Mawi and Muhamad Hafizan Shafuan Kamarulzaman submitted that Sathiaraj's conviction for murdering Wong should be overturned on the grounds of insanity. In the alternative situation, should the murder conviction was upheld, Sathiaraj's lawyers sought to have Sathiaraj's death sentence commuted to a prison sentence permitted for murder. Deputy Public Prosecutor Mohd Fairuz Johari, in rebuttal, pointed out that Sathiaraj's counsel did not raise the defence of insanity during his trial and the psychiatrists certified in their pre-trial assessments that Sathiaraj was fit to plead and stand trial.

On that same day, the Court of Appeal's three judges – Justice Datuk Hadhariah Syed Ismail, Justice Datuk Azman Abdullah and Justice Datuk SM Komathy Suppiah – unanimously dismissed Sathiaraj's appeal after finding that his conviction was safe and the death penalty was appropriate in his case. Sathiaraj did not appeal against his conviction and sentence of 13 years' jail and caning for both sodomy and rape.

On 13 January 2025, Sathiaraj's appeal was allowed by the Federal Court of Malaysia, the highest court of the nation. Although his murder conviction still stand, the death sentence was commuted to 40 years' imprisonment and 12 strokes of the cane.

== See also ==
- Capital punishment in Malaysia
