= Yashmin Fauzi rape and murder =

2015 rape-murder of a nurse in Malaysia

Yashmin Fauzi
- Yashmin Fauzi, pictured before her death
- Born: Yashmin Fauzi c. 1990; Malaysia
- Died: 1 March 2015 (aged 25); Kampung Batu Papan, Gua Musang, Kelantan, Malaysia
- Cause of death: Fatal slash wounds to the neck
- Occupation: Nurse
- Known for: Rape and murder victim
- Spouse: Mohd Azrul Isahak
- Children: Ahmad Qashri Mohd Azrul (eldest son); Qashri Adli Mohd Azrul (second son); Qashri Adam Mohd Azrul (youngest son)
- Family: Isahak Deris (father-in-law)

On 1 March 2015, a 25-year-old nurse and wife of an auxiliary policeman was found with multiple slash and stab wounds at her home in Kampung Batu Papan, near Gua Musang in the Malaysian state of Kelantan. The victim, Yashmin Fauzi, gave a description and identity of her attacker who robbed, raped and slashed her before she died. Yashmin's killer was arrested after some investigations, and it was found that the perpetrator, Mohammad Awari Ahmad, had broken into the house to commit robbery, and he also raped Yashmin before murdering her in front of Yashmin's five-year-old eldest son. Mohammad Awari was found guilty of both counts of rape and murder in 2018, and sentenced to death for the charge of murder while receiving 18 years' jail and 12 strokes of the cane for the other charge of rape. Mohammad Awari lost his appeals between 2019 and 2020, but on 7 August 2024, Mohammad Awari's death sentence for Yashmin's murder was commuted to 40 years in jail and 12 strokes of the cane.

== Murder ==
On 1 March 2015, the wife of an auxiliary policeman was robbed, raped and murdered at her home in Kampung Batu Papan, near Gua Musang in Kelantan.

The victim was identified as 25-year-old Yashmin Fauzi, who worked as a nurse and was married with three sons at the time of her death. Her 30-year-old husband Mohd Azrul Isahak, who returned home after feeling unwell at the start of his work shift, discovered the semi-naked Yashmin lying motionless outside their matrimonial home in a pool of blood, presumably taken outside by her assailant(s) or herself attempting to seek help from the neighbours. Yashmin was taken to Gua Musang Hospital for treatment, but she was pronounced dead at 6.40am. It was believed that Yashmin had been attacked by robber(s) who intruded her home while she was sleeping. There were stab and slash wounds found on the hands and neck of the victim. Gua Musang District Police Chief, Supt Saiful Bahri Abdullah also revealed that the victim's bedroom had numerous bloodstains, suggesting that the attack took place in the bedroom.

Before she died, Yashmin left behind a written note that pinpointed the identity and description of her attacker. One of Yashmin's sons, aged five, also told the police that he saw a "bad man" attacking and murdering his mother, and he was reportedly shocked and traumatized by the ordeal. The boy was the only one out of Yashmin's three sons to witness the death of his mother, because his other two brothers, aged three years and six months respectively, were asleep at that time. Kelantan Police Chief Datuk Mazlan Lazim issued a media statement, expressing his belief that with the available information that alluded to the identity of the killer, they would be able to solve the case. With the death of his wife, Mohs Azrul told a newspaper that he promised to take care of his three sons and provide them with all the love they deserved in the absence of their mother.

Shortly after the murder of Yashmin, a 22-year-old man had been arrested and investigated for the case, and the police recovered a parang, which was presumed to be the murder weapon. On 11 March 2015, the suspect, reportedly named Mohammad Awari Ahmad, was charged with murder.

== Trial of Mohammad Awari Ahmad ==
Mohammad Awari Ahmad
- Born: 1993 (age 32–33); Malaysia
- Status: Incarcerated since 2015
- Convictions: Murder (x1); Rape (x1)
- Penalty: Murder; Death, commuted to 40 years' imprisonment plus 12 strokes of the cane (concurrent); Rape; 18 years' imprisonment plus 12 strokes of the cane (concurrent)

Details
- Victims: Yashmin Fauzi (deceased)
- Date: 1 March 2015
- Country: Malaysia
- State: Kelantan
- Date apprehended: 1 March 2015

The exact date of when Mohammad Awari Ahmad's trial began was unknown, but after being in remand for a period of time, Mohammad Awari's case was officially slated for trial hearing at the Kota Bahru High Court. The prosecution was led by Deputy Public Prosecutor Shaharaliza Ab Razak, while Mohammad Awari was represented by defence lawyer Latifah Ariffin, and the trial was presided over by Judicial Commissioner Datuk Ahmad Bache.

The trial court was told that on the day in question, Mohammad Awari, who was formerly a sawmill worker and also a family friend of Yashmin, broke into her house in order to commit robbery, and between 12.30 and 2am, he was caught red-handed by Yashmin, who was awakened by his sounds of ransacking the house, and he attacked her and overpowered the 25-year-old victim. Mohammad Awari wielded a parang to stab and slash Yashmin several times, including twice on her neck; a pathologist confirmed that the neck wounds were sufficient in the ordinary course of nature to cause death. During the course of the attack, Mohammad Awari had raped Yashmin, and Yashmin's eldest son witnessed the horrific ordeal that befell upon his mother, who was mortally wounded but managed to leave behind the identity of her killer just before she died. After the end of his monstrous acts, Mohammad Awari stole Yashmin's mobile phone and RM200 in cash, and went out to drink alcohol thereafter. Mohammad Awari reportedly denied that he had the intention of murdering the victim when his defence was called.

On 31 January 2018, Judicial Commissioner Datuk Ahmad Bache delivered his verdict. In his judgment, Judicial Commissioner Ahmad did not accept Mohammad Awari's claims of not having the intention to cause the death of Yashmin, given that he repeatedly attacked Yashmin by using a parang to cause severe harm to her, and the manner and brutality of the parang attack demonstrated his intention to kill. Furthermore, this intention was corroborated by the decision of Mohammad Awari to switch from a wooden stick to the parang prior to entering the house to commit robbery. The judge pointed out that the victim's five-year-old son also witnessed the attack and his testimony of witnessing the accused slashing his mother's neck twice had cemented the prosecution's contention that Mohammad Awari possessed an inherently clear intention to commit the offence of murder.

Therefore, Mohammad Awari was found guilty of the rape and murder of Yashmin Fauzi on both counts. For the charge of rape, Mohammad Awari was sentenced to 18 years' imprisonment and 12 strokes of the cane. However, for the other charge of murder, Mohammad Awari was sentenced to the mandatory death penalty, the sole punishment prescribed for murder under Section 302 of the Malaysian Penal Code.

== Appeal process ==
After he was sentenced to hang, Mohammad Awari appealed to the Court of Appeal against his murder conviction and death sentence, but the appeal was dismissed in 2019. The Court of Appeal affirmed the High Court's decision to accept the victim's dying message of her killer's identity, and accepted that Mohammad Awari had intended to kill Yashmin or knowing that his act will cause injury which can normally lead to the death of Yashmin according to Sections 300(a) and 300(c) of the Penal Code. As a final legal bid to escape the gallows, Mohammad Awari appealed to the Federal Court of Malaysia, the highest court of the nation.

On 7 October 2020, the Federal Court began to hear Mohammad Awari's appeal. While the appellant did not challenge his conviction and sentence for rape, Mohammad Awari's counsel argued that the prosecution had failed to prove that the appellant had the intention to commit murder, and rounding up the circumstances of how Mohammad Awari broke into the house and committed the crime after being caught by surprise, the defence argued that Mohammad Awari's murder conviction should be downgraded to manslaughter.

However, the prosecution brought the Federal Court's attention to the callousness and inhumane nature of the murder, and urged the court to maintain the death sentence and murder conviction. Deputy Public Prosecutor Nazran Mohd Sham stated that the murder happened right in front of the victim’s five-year-old son. He described the actions of Mohammad Awari as "brutal, aggressive and vicious", and pointed out that the appellant raped Yashmin while she was bleeding from her neck wound. He cited that Yashmin sustained 11 injuries on the neck and hands, as a result of Mohammad Awari using a parang to slash the right and left side of the victim’s neck, which was clear evidence of Mohammad Awari's intention to kill. The prosecution also brought up the fact that Mohammad Awari had stolen RM200 and a mobile phone belonging to Yashmin, and went to a restaurant to consume seven bottles of liquor, so as to "celebrate".

After their deliberation of the submissions, the Federal Court's three-member bench – consisting of Justice Rohana Yusuf, Justice Vernon Ong Lam Kiat and Justice Hasnah Mohammed Hashim – unanimously rejected the appeal, after they observed that there was no error made by either the High Court or the Court of Appeal. Justice Rohana, who pronounced the ruling, said that the prosecution successfully proven the elements of the murder charge, specifically the intention of causing death. She also said the supporting evidence, such as eyewitness accounts, was very strong and overwhelmingly against Mohammad Awari.

For this, the Federal Court upheld the murder conviction and confirmed the death penalty on Mohammad Awari, whose conviction and 18-year jail term (with the caning) for raping Yashmin was also finalized as well since he did not appeal this aspect of the original judgement.

== Re-sentencing in 2024 ==
Two years and six months after Mohammad Awari lost his appeal to the Federal Court, the Malaysian government abolished the mandatory death penalty in April 2023, and under the revised laws, anyone convicted of murder would face either the death sentence or a lengthy jail term ranging between 30 and 40 years, and after the new laws took effect in July 2023, 936 out of more than 1,000 death row prisoners in Malaysia filed applications to the Federal Court of Malaysia to be re-sentenced, and the Federal Court completed the hearings of 474 applications (19 of which had their death sentences maintained) as of June 2024. Mohammad Awari was among the offenders who appealed for re-sentencing to the Federal Court.

On 7 August 2024, the Federal Court allowed Mohammad Awari's re-sentencing plea and reduced his death sentence to 40 years' imprisonment and 12 strokes of the cane, after finding that despite the exceptional circumstances of his crime, they considered Mohammad Awari's young age of 22 as a mitigating factor. Mohammad Awari's 18-year jail term and 12 strokes of the cane for rape was to take effect concurrently.

== Aftermath ==
During the same month of March 2015 when the murder of Yashmin Fauzi took place, several groups of women rights advocates called for better protection of females against gender violence.

In June 2015, Yashmin's three sons were among 150 orphans who received donations under the Titipan Kasih Harian Metro (TKHM) scheme, and the boys' 58-year-old grandmother Che Zainun Daud was reportedly grateful for the aid, and described it as meaningful for her grandsons, who lost their mother in such a terrible way.

In February 2018, Nik Elin Rashid, an activist lawyer from Kelantan, stated that the Malaysian Islamic Party’s Islamic administration in Kelantan should reinforce measures to ensure the protection of women, given that despite the enforcement of hudud laws and practice of women wearing Tudongs, these practices did not protect Yashmin from falling victim to rape and murder, and did not deter Mohammad Awari from raping and murdering Yashmin, although she noted that Mohammad Awari had yet to appeal at this point in time. Women’s Aid Organisation director Sumitra Visvanathan also stated that such crimes often happen due to men possibly harbouring a sense of entitlement over women.

In May 2019, Isahak Deris, Yashmin's 67-year-old father-in-law, agreed to be interviewed over the case of his daughter-in-law's death. He stated that for the past four years, he would often bring his three grandsons to their mother's grave every Friday except for Hari Raya Aidilfitri, as his grandsons missed their mother greatly, and he himself also could not get over the loss of his daughter-in-law. Isahak also said that while his two older grandsons still remembered Yashmin, his youngest grandson, who was only six months old at the time of the murder, often asked where was his mother and what happened to her, after seeing that his friends had mothers, and his brothers had to tell him the truth. In May 2020, the three sons of Yashmin, who all were living with their aunt Robiatul Ishak at this point in time, stated in another interview that they missed their mother, and earlier that same year, Yashmin's father-in-law died from unknown causes.

During the same week of October 2020 when Mohammad Awari's appeal was dismissed by the Federal Court, his case became a focal of attention during the debate of capital punishment in Malaysia. While the discussion alluded to the heinous nature of Mohammad Awari's crimes, it was noted that nearly 70% of the prisoners held on Malaysia's death row were convicted of drug trafficking and not all the prisoners were under death sentences for crimes of the same magnitude as Mohammad Awari's, and the abolitionists cited that the death penalty should not be deployed as it was state-sanctioned revenge for executing those convicted of murder and might have irreversible effects on a person once it was carried out.

In April 2023, in an interview, Yashmin's husband Mohd Azrul Isahak revealed that even after eight years since the murder of his wife, his eldest son Ahmad Qushri, aged 13 at this point, was still traumatized and grappling with grief over his mother's death. By then, Mohd Azrul had remarried and he had three more children, and he became a stepfather to his second wife's three children from her previous marriage, and he was struggling to feed his family with the monthly income of RM1,700 he earned as a civil servant. Mohd Azrul stated that Ahmad Qushri and his second brother still remembered and missed their mother, although the youngest son he had with Yashmin had little to no memory of his birth mother since he was just a baby when the tragedy befell on their family back in 2015.

== See also ==
- Capital punishment in Malaysia
