= Murder of Yong Boon Cheong =

2014 stabbing of a millionaire in Malaysia

Yong Boon Cheong
- Yong Boon Cheong, who was stabbed to death
- Born: Yong Boon Cheong c. 1960; Malaysia
- Died: 4 July 2014 (aged 54); Jalan Skudai, Danga Bay, Johor Bahru, Malaysia
- Cause of death: Fatal stab wound to the heart
- Occupations: Businessman; Plastic manufacturing factory owner
- Known for: Murder victim
- Spouse: Unnamed wife (m. 2009; his death 2014)
- Children: One son

On 4 July 2014, in Johor, Malaysia, 54-year-old millionaire Yong Boon Cheong (杨文松 Yáng Wénsōng) went missing after he was last seen at a coffeeshop. About 24 hours after his wife reported him missing, Yong's burnt body was discovered at an oil palm estate near Kampung Seri Paya in Batu Pahat, and the police eventually arrested two men, who both allegedly killed Yong along Jalan Skudai, Danga Bay, Johor Bahru after assaulting him at the shop and bringing him into their car. The two men – ship cleaner Izwanuddin Kasim (also spelt Izwanuddin Kassim) and his Singaporean friend Noriskandar Zainal Yahya – were both charged with murder, but after the end of trial proceedings in 2017, Noriskandar was sentenced to eight years' jail after pleading guilty to abetting Izwanuddin to dispose of the body, but Izwanuddin was found guilty of murder and sentenced to death. Izwanuddin's appeals were dismissed between 2019 and 2021, and he is currently on death row awaiting execution.

== Disappearance and murder ==
On 4 July 2014, 54-year-old millionaire Yong Boon Cheong went missing after he was last seen at a coffee shop in Johor, Malaysia. Prior to this, Yong was said to have entered the car of an unknown individual outside his house and left the area.

According to witnesses, at around 2.30 am on the date of his disappearance, Yong was seen at the coffee shop having supper with another individual, and they witnessed a group of Malay men attacking him, and assaulting him inside the shop itself. Yong was said to have been overpowered and taken into a vehicle by the same group of attackers, and afterwards, there were no other sightings of Yong since. The people present at the coffee shop reportedly did not dare to intervene as they feared getting implicated and presumed it as a gang-related altercation. Yong's wife reported him missing on that day itself after the family failed to contact him.

About 24 hours after Yong was reported missing, the burnt remains of a man were discovered at an oil palm plantation near Kampung Seri Paya in Batu Pahat. A man living inside the kampung itself discovered the body underneath a burnt car tire, after he picked up a burning smell while he was on the way home, and the man called the police after recognizing a human hand among the charred objects he discovered. The police examined the scene, and the pathologist also verified that there were stab wounds on the chest and the body had been burnt after the death of the victim, since there were no soot particles in the lungs or airways.

When the charred corpse was discovered and Yong's family received news of it, they suspected that the corpse was none other than Yong's and they feared the worst, and the police also took DNA samples from Yong's only son and one of Yong's brothers to identify whether the body belonged to Yong. Background information showed that Yong, the eighth of nine children (three daughters and six sons) in his family, was married in 2009 and had one son, who was four years old at the time of his father's disappearance and death, and Yong's parents were both deceased prior to the case. Yong was an alumnus of Yong Peng High School and had also donated funds to his school, and engaged in philanthropy, and he was known to be kind despite his affluent wealth. On 15 July 2014, the police's DNA tests confirmed that the charred corpse indeed belonged to the missing millionaire Yong Boon Cheong.

Simultaneously, on 8 July 2014, the police were able to identify and capture a total of seven suspects, consisting of five men and two women, at a hotel in Iskandar Puteri, and detained them for investigations. Reportedly, one of the suspects confessed to having murdered Yong and burnt his body as part of disposing the evidence, but at that point of time, the police had yet to identify Yong's burnt remains and hence, they did not declare the case to have been solved until the DNA results came out. Forensic evidence also verified that Yong had been stabbed in the heart and died before his body was burnt. After the confirmation of his identity, Yong's body was returned to his family for funeral preparations. Over 200 people attended his funeral, and his body was cremated at Perpetual Memorial Park.

Eventually, out of these seven suspects, two men were detained while the remaining five were released after they were re-classified as police witnesses. The police later confirmed that the two men under custody would be charged with murder.

On 27 July 2014, the two men, identified as 34-year-old Izwanuddin Kasim and 37-year-old Noriskandar Zainal Yahya, were officially charged with murder before a magistrate's court. At the time of their arrests, Izwanuddin was a Malaysian ship cleaner married with two children and had formerly worked in Singapore, while Noriskandar himself was a Singaporean businessman.

== Murder trial ==
In March 2015, both Noriskandar Zainal Yahya and Izwanuddin Kasim stood trial for the murder of Yong Boon Cheong at the Johor Bahru High Court. The trial was presided over by Justice Datuk Mohd Sofian Abd Razak. The trial, which lasted over two years, featured testimonies from 28 witnesses.

The trial court was told that on the date of the murder, a confrontation broke out between Yong and Izwanuddin at the former's residence in Danga Bay, after Izwanuddin's car bumped into Yong's vehicle, and Izwanuddin had demanded an unspecified amount of money from Yong to cover the repair costs of his car, which he alleged was the vehicle of a royal family member. When Yong refused to make the payment, a fight ensued, prompting the two men to visit multiple locations in an attempt to resolve the dispute.

Following the altercation, per the statements of the men and objective evidence, Yong got into Izwanuddin's Mitsubishi Evo car with Izwanuddin and traveled to Istana Pasir Pelangi, as what Izwanuddin claimed. The pair then switched to another vehicle, a Jaguar, and proceeded to Restoran Singgah Selalu. At the restaurant, Yong attempted to escape but was stopped by Izwanuddin, who assaulted him until he bled from the face. The court also heard that after the incident, Izwanuddin contacted his Singaporean co-defendant, Noriskandar, for assistance in resolving the situation. After the phone call, Noriskandar had brought his girlfriend to the restaurant where he met Izwanuddin. Afterwards, Yong was forced into Noriskandar's car with the two defendants and Noriskandar's girlfriend, and on the way, Noriskandar dropped off his girlfriend at Sultanah Aminah Hospital before the two accused and Yong continued on their journey.

It was the prosecution's case that Yong was possibly murdered between the time Noriskandar's girlfriend alighted his car and when both the defendants drove to Batu Pahat with Yong as their hostage, and the most likely location of the murder was along Jalan Skudai, Danga Bay, Johor Bahru. According to Noriskandar, he accompanied his girlfriend into the hospital while leaving both Yong and Izwanuddin inside the car, and he testified that after he came back to the car, he saw Yong lying in the back seat, leaning towards Izwanuddin. Izwanuddin reportedly asked for a cloth from Noriskandar, claiming he wanted to support Yong's head. Initially, Noriskandar drove the car before Izwanuddin took over the wheel upon reaching Kulai, and Noriskandar fell asleep during the rest of the journey. When they arrived at an oil palm plantation in Batu Pahat, Izwanuddin used petrol to ignite a fire, burning Yong's body beneath a pile of old tyres.

A pathologist from Sultanah Aminah Hospital testified that based on his autopsy findings, prior to the two men setting fire on his corpse, Yong died as a result of a fatal stab wound on his chest, which penetrated his heart. Based on the objective evidence and testimonies gathered, it was alleged that Izwanuddin was, at all times, together with Yong before the disposal of his corpse, which gave rise to the high possibility that Izwanuddin was the one who directly killed Yong by stabbing him to death, and a brass knuckle blade found in Izwanuddin's possession was compared to the wounds inflicted, which was consistent with the shape of the weapon.

On 4 August 2016, in midst of the murder trial, Noriskandar pleaded guilty to a reduced charge of abetting Izwanuddin in the disposal of Yong's body, after the prosecution reduced the murder charge, and Noriskandar also turned state evidence against Izwanuddin. Noriskandar was sentenced to six years in prison by the Johor Bahru Sessions Court on that same day, after the prosecution submitted that a deterrent sentence was required due to Noriskandar not reporting the crime to the authorities and helped to conceal traces of the murder, although the defence argued in mitigation that Noriskandar made the one mistake of loaning his car to Izwanuddin and he did not participate in the stabbing. Noriskandar's six-year jail term was ordered to take effect from the date of his arrest. However, sources from 2017 onwards indicated that Noriskandar's sentence was revised to eight years' imprisonment.

This decision led to Izwanuddin becoming the sole person left undergoing trial for murder, and Izwanuddin put forward an alibi defence, claiming that he was not present at the scene of crime when the murder happened. After the accused completed his defence, the verdict was reserved until 1 October 2017.

On 1 October 2017, Justice Datuk Mohd Sofian Abd Razak delivered his verdict. In his judgement, Justice Mohd Sofian found that the prosecution had proven beyond a reasonable doubt that Izwanuddin had killed 54-year-old Yong Boon Cheong back in 2014. He stated that there was tangible evidence to show that Izwanuddin and Yong had confronted each other over a traffic accident and they had gone to places to settle their grudges, and this culminated into the fatal stabbing of Yong. He also alluded to Noriskandar's testimony that Yong was still alive when he and his girlfriend left Izwanuddin's car while he brought his girlfriend into the hospital, showing that at one point, Izwanuddin had likely murdered Yong during the journey despite the absence of direct evidence or witnesses, and his alibi defence was ought to be rejected.

Since the post-mortem reports showed that the stab wounds to Yong's chest penetrated his heart and were sufficient in the ordinary course of nature to cause death, Justice Mohd Sofian stated it was also certain that Izwanuddin had stabbed Yong and the pattern of the wounds were consistent with the brass knuckle blade which Izwanuddin carried at the time of the murder. He also pointed out the witness testimony of a petrol vendor, who recognized Izwanuddin as the person who bought petrol from him on the day of the murder; and the same petrol was used to burn Yong's remains. On these grounds, 37-year-old Izwanuddin Kasim was found guilty of murder, and sentenced to death by hanging. Reportedly, Izwanuddin was overwhelmed with shock when the death sentence was pronounced upon him, and he wept on the dock before he was escorted by officers out of the courtroom.

== Appeal process ==
On 30 September 2019, the Court of Appeal's three-member bench – consisting of Justice Datuk Yaacob Md Sam, Justice Datuk Mohamad Zabidin Mohd Diah and Justice P. Ravinthran – unanimously dismissed the appeal of Izwanuddin, after finding that his conviction of the murder was safe and therefore upheld both his murder conviction and death sentence.

On 11 November 2021, Izwanuddin's appeal was slated for hearing at the Federal Court of Malaysia, the highest court of the nation. However, the three judges – Vernon Ong Lam Kiat, Zaleha Yusof and Harmindar Singh Dhaliwal – were of the common view that the circumstantial evidence was overwhelmingly incriminating against Izwanuddin, and the original trial judge had made no error in convicting Izwanuddin of Yong's murder. For this, the Federal Court affirmed the murder conviction and confirmed the death penalty for Izwanuddin.

== Current status ==
Nearly 18 months after Izwanuddin lost his appeal to the Federal Court, while he was still incarcerated on death row, the Malaysian government abolished the mandatory death penalty in April 2023, and under the revised laws, anyone convicted of murder would face either the death sentence or a lengthy jail term ranging between 30 and 40 years, and after the new laws took effect in July 2023, 936 out of more than 1,000 death row prisoners in Malaysia filed applications to the Federal Court of Malaysia to be re-sentenced. It was not confirmed if Izwanuddin appealed for re-sentencing in his case.

As of 2024, Izwanuddin remains on death row awaiting his execution.

Noriskandar was presently released after completing his eight-year sentence since 2022.

== See also ==
- Capital punishment in Malaysia
