= Jimmy Chua Chap Seng =

Singaporean criminal and ringleader of the Pudu Prison siege

- 1986 police mugshot of Jimmy Chua
- Born: Chua Chap Seng; 28 August 1947; Singapore
- Died: 10 October 1989 (aged 42); Pudu Prison, Kuala Lumpur, Selangor, Malaysia
- Other names: Jimmy Chua; Hokkien Chai
- Occupation: Police officer (former)
- Known for: Ringleader of the 1986 Pudu Prison siege Murder of police constable Mohamed Yassin Ismail
- Spouse: Three wives
- Children: Two sons
- Status: Executed
- Convictions: Illegal possession of firearms (one count); Illegal possession of ammunition (one count)
- Criminal charges: Murder; Illegal possession of firearms Illegal possession of ammunition Kidnapping for ransom
- Penalty: Death penalty

Jimmy Chua Chap Seng (蔡捷成, 28 August 1947 – 10 October 1989), nicknamed Hokkien Chai, was a Singaporean criminal and former police officer who was infamous for masterminding the 1986 Pudu Prison hostage incident. Chua, who allegedly committed the murder of a police officer and several firearm offences in Malaysia, was detained at Pudu Prison when he and five other inmates decided to orchestrate a prison escape by taking two members of the prison staff hostage for six days. The incident ended with no fatalities, and Chua and his five accomplices were all arrested and faced kidnapping charges over the hostage incident. However, in a separate court case, Chua was sentenced to death for firearm charges under the Internal Security Act, and was hanged on 10 October 1989 without being convicted for his role in the Pudu incident, which oversaw the imprisonment of his five associates for the case.

== Early life ==
Born on 28 August 1947 in Singapore, Chua Chap Seng, also known as Jimmy Chua, was the third of seven sons and three daughters in his family, and grew up in a kampung in Bukit Panjang. His father died when he was 13, and his mother singlehandedly brought him and his siblings up, and made a living by raising pigs at Bukit Batok and selling fish at a market. Chua was described to be an obedient child and quiet schoolboy, and a year after his father's death, Chua dropped out of Bukit Panjang Government High School. According to his neighbours and family in Singapore, the loss of his father was likely to have caused him to gradually turn to a life of crime. Prior to 1984, one of Chua's siblings, his sixth brother, died at age of 24 due to an illness.

Chua joined the Singapore Police Force in 1966, and three years later, he rose to become a police investigator. However, Chua was later dismissed due to professional misconduct. News reports in 1972 revealed that Chua was one of the four police officers charged in a bribery case, and Chua was sentenced to jail for 15 months as a result.

In his adulthood, Chua reportedly had three wives in Malaysia. He had two sons (born in 1974 and 1978 respectively) from his three marriages.

== 1984 murder case and arrest ==
After the end of his short-lived police career, Jimmy Chua Chap Seng turned to a life of crime, and was allegedly involved in several other criminal activities, including possessing firearms and acting as the leader of a secret society.

The exact details of Chua's criminal history was scarce, but on 8 February 1984, Chua was involved in the murder of a policeman in Malaysia. On that date itself, Chua, who was then committing vehicle theft in Jalan Changkat Abdullah, Kuala Lumpur, was arrested by Police Constable (PC) Mohamed Yassin bin Ismail (also spelt Mohamed Yasin bin Ismail). PC Mohamed Yassin was handcuffing Chua when Chua managed to raise his free hand to grab a pistol, and he fired the gun thrice at point blank, and the three shots hit PC Mohamed Yassin on the abdomen and chest. PC Mohamed Yassin, then 27 years old, died one hour after he was rushed to a nearby hospital.

Chua managed to evade the police for several days after the murder, and the Royal Malaysia Police, in an effort to trace PC Mohamed Yassin's killer, sought help from their Singaporean counterparts to search for the suspect, after they found the suspect to have possible links to a gang of vehicle thieves from Singapore (where similar cases with the same modus operandi occurred). Chua was arrested by the Malaysian police at Jalan Khoo Teik Ee on 14 February 1984, six days after PC Mohamed Yassin's death, and thereby charged with murder. As Chua was found to be in illegal possession of a .32 Llama pistol and six bullets at the time of his arrest, he was additionally charged with illegal possession of firearms and ammunition. Under the laws of Malaysia, either of the charges which Chua faced could warrant the death penalty if found guilty. Chua was remanded at Pudu Prison since 13 August 1984 while awaiting trial for the above offences.

In April 1985, Chua escaped from hospital while receiving treatment for an illness. He was eventually recaptured at Seremban after a manhunt, and taken back to Pudu Prison, where he was detained since 1984 while awaiting trial.

== Pudu Prison siege ==
=== Hostage incident ===
On 17 October 1986, the second year of his incarceration at Pudu Prison, 39-year-old Jimmy Chua, together with five fellow prisoners, orchestrated a prison escape attempt.

Knowing the imminent fact that he would be sentenced to death, Chua decided to escape from prison in order to avoid the death penalty. Chua roped in five detainees to join him. Three of the prisoners – 32-year-old Lam Hok Sung (林福生), 24-year-old Ng Lai Huat (黃來發) and 19-year-old Sim Ah Lan (沈亞南) – were pending trial for firearm offences under the Internal Security Act, while the remaining two – 27-year-old Pang Boon Boo (方文武) and 21-year-old Yap See Keong (葉志強) – were charged for assault and rioting respectively. Similar to Chua himself, Lam, Ng and Sim were at risk of facing the gallows if convicted of the firearm offences they were indicted for. Sim reportedly joined in the plot as he was dissatisfied with the poor living conditions.

On 17 October 1986, Chua and his five accomplices were taken to the prison medical unit to undergo a routine checkup. Upon entry, Chua and his accomplices took Dr. Radzi Jaffar, a 45-year-old skin specialist and Abdul Aziz Abdul Majid, a 38-year-old laboratory technician, hostage and brandished their makeshift knives (made from improvised items). Chua and his gang would hold both medical officers hostage for the following six days and five nights, and they demanded the police to reduce their respective criminal charges and to provide them cars and money in exchange for the freedom and safety of the two hostages, but the police did not back down. A former inmate, who spent time at Pudu Prison for drug consumption at that time, stated in 2010 that he remembered the gang of six shouting at all the other prisoners to go back to their cells in Malay, "Semua Masuk Bilik!". Some of the prison staff and inmates – including ex-politician Mokhtar Hashim (who was serving a life sentence for murder at the prison) – present at the medical center were forced out of the center, before the gang of six locked themselves in the centre with the hostages. The two hostages told the press after their rescue that the six captors threatened to harm them during the siege.

Prisons Department director-general, Datuk Ibrahim Mohamed, took charge of formulating a plan to arrest Chua and his gang and to save the hostages, and none of the outsiders were allowed to enter the prison for fear of jeopardizing the rescue operation, and elite police units were deployed to stake out at the prison compound. Food were continually sent in to the medical center, but the inmates allowed only the hostages to eat the food while they sustained themselves on snacks left in the medical center. The police and government officials also attempted to negotiate with the gang of six to release the hostages and surrender themselves, and many of the gang's family members, including Chua's eight-year-old son and 66-year-old mother, went into the prison to persuade the six to give themselves up to the police. Malaysian politician Lee Lam Thye also offered to become a hostage in place of the two medical officers. Prime Minister Mahathir Mohamad, who was concerned with a potential political fallout should bloodshed happened in the crisis, ordered the police to not resort to violence unless necessary. The prison was under lockdown and the general inmate population was not allowed to go out of their cells for bath time. Two bomohs suggested that they should conduct rituals with hopes to make the six surrender themselves, but the prison authorities denied inviting the bomohs.

It was reported that throughout the six days when the incident was ongoing, the pressure of the situation began to take a toll on the inmates, who all began to have second thoughts of backing out. Eventually, one of the six prisoners, Pang Boon Boo, decided to betray his five partners and came into contact with Datuk Ibrahim, and helped the police to enter the prison medical center. After Pang, whose identity was originally withheld in earlier media sources, gave a signal, a team of policemen, armed with canes and wooden sticks, barged into the center and subdued Chua and his associates while rescuing both Abdul Aziz and Radzi, who were unharmed. Pang, who helped the police to end the crisis, was transferred to Kajang Prison with better living conditions, as part of a condition behind his assistance of the authorities. Pang's father, who visited his son with his wife, younger son (Pang's brother) and grandson (Pang's child) during the hostage situation, also confirmed to the press that his son wanted to back out but Chua berated him for being cowardly.

After the safe return of the hostages, Datuk Ibrahim was praised for the successful closure of the horrific chapter that shook the prison and the whole country alike. In June 1987, about a year after the incident, one of the police officers who contributed to the arrest of Chua and his gang was awarded for his efforts.

=== Pudu Prison siege trial ===
On 11 December 1986, Chua and his five accomplices – Lam, Ng, Sim, Pang and Yap – were charged with kidnapping for ransom under Section 3(1) of the Kidnapping Act, which carried either the death penalty or life imprisonment if found guilty. The prisoners, while pending trial, had to be on close watch by heavily armed guards to prevent them from committing suicide, and the mastermind Jimmy Chua, who went on trial for his other crimes before the Pudu case, had to be escorted by more than 20 heavily armed officers to ensure security.

Eventually, in April 1987, the gang of six was ordered to stand trial at the High Court on a later date, and the trial took place in March 1990. However, prior to the kidnapping trial, Chua was since separately convicted and executed in 1989 for the other offences he committed prior to the Pudu Prison case, and therefore he was neither put on trial nor convicted for his role in the prison incident. The court proceedings later continued against the remaining five suspects in the absence of Chua.

It was the prosecution's case that the alleged demands made by Chua to the police that his associates and himself should be given money and getaway vehicles in exchange for the freedom of the hostages they kidnapped, and by strict application of the law, Chua's demands amounted to a ransom and it formed the basis of their case against Chua's five accomplices for kidnapping. However, the death of Chua left a huge impact on the trial outcome, as it posed a question of whether or not the kidnapping charges could be substantiated against his accomplices with his alleged ransom attempts being uncorroborated and unverified without his testimony or cross-examination.

Leading criminal lawyer Karpal Singh, who represented two of the five accomplices, argued that the purported demands of ransom made by Chua, allegedly on behalf of himself and the five, should not be used against his clients and the other accused persons, partly given that Chua had died and there was no way to verify the validity of these alleged ransom requests as hearsay evidence against the five remaining defendants. Karpal's objections, as well as similar arguments made by other lawyers of the defendants, were accepted by the trial court, which ruled that Chua's alleged demands cannot be admitted as hearsay evidence.

On 16 March 1990, the five accomplices of Chua pleaded guilty to reduced charges of wrongful confinement and abduction, therefore escaping a possible death sentence. Yap and Pang were each sentenced to three years in jail while the remaining three were jailed for five years each. However, despite evading the gallows for the Pudu hostage incident, one of the five men, Lam, was separately sentenced to hang for a firearms offence in 1988 in another trial and likely executed after losing his final appeal in 1997.

=== Aftermath of siege ===
The Pudu Prison incident brought light to the problems experienced at the prison, including the overcrowding of Pudu Prison and the poor living conditions faced by the inmates. There were calls for improvement of the prison's living environment itself.

Throughout the following decades after it occurred, the Pudu Prison siege was known to be one of Malaysia's shocking crimes and its first, yet unprecedented incident of a prison hostage situation, and the infamy of Chua endured through time. The prison itself eventually went defunct, and the prison building was demolished by 2012.

24 years after the Pudu Prison siege, the case was featured in a documentary in 2010, titled the "Beyond Bars: KL's Pudu Prison".

== Execution ==
A month after he masterminded the Pudu Prison siege, on 21 November 1986, 39-year-old Jimmy Chua was tried and found guilty of illegal possession of firearms and ammunition under the Internal Security Act, and sentenced to death by the Kuala Lumpur High Court. Subsequently, the Supreme Court of Malaysia (now renamed the Federal Court of Malaysia), the highest court of the nation, dismissed Chua's final appeal on 19 September 1988.

Chua was hanged on 10 October 1989 at Pudu Prison, at the age of 42. Prior to his execution, Chua was given a last meal of meat and seafood bought by his family, and shared it with 28 other inmates at the prison's death row section, and received a last visit from his friends and family (including his two sons and three wives) in Singapore.

== See also ==
- Capital punishment in Malaysia
