= Death of Jean Perera Sinnappa =

1979 cold case of a former beauty queen's murder in Malaysia

Jean Perera
- Born: Philomena Jean Perera a/p V. Perera; 26 October 1947; Negeri Sembilan, Malaysia
- Died: 6 April 1979 (aged 31); Federal Highway, Subang, Selangor, Malaysia
- Cause of death: Multiple stab wounds
- Occupations: Beauty queen (former); School teacher
- Employer: Sekolah Sultan Abdul Samad
- Known for: Murder victim
- Spouse: Sinnappa Sivapakiam
- Children: 3
- Parent(s): Mabel Perera (mother); V. Perera (father)

On 6 April 1979, at a secluded underpass near the Subang International Airport, 31-year-old Jean Perera Sinnappa (26 October 1947 – 6 April 1979), a former beauty queen and teacher, was found brutally murdered with multiple stab wounds to her chest and still strapped in the seat of her brother-in-law's car. Jean Perera's brother-in-law and lover, Karthigesu Sivapakiam (or S. Karthigesu; 23 March 1942 – 27 August 2023), was found lying unconscious near the crime scene, and he was taken to hospital, where he told the police that he was knocked out by an unknown assailant while he stepped out of the car to relieve himself, making it seem that the murderer was the same person who knocked out Karthigesu.

However, after further investigations, Karthigesu was arrested as a suspect and later put on trial for murder, on the grounds that Karthigesu had killed Jean Perera due to jealousy over the presence of another lover in Jean Perera's life. Karthigesu was originally found guilty of murder and sentenced to death in 1980, but after a key prosecution witness confessed to lying about Karthigesu's threat to kill Jean Perera, Karthigesu was acquitted after the Federal Court of Malaysia allowed his appeal, and the witness was subsequently jailed for perjury. The murder of Jean Perera Sinnappa remains unsolved as of today.

== Murder investigation ==
On 6 April 1979, two Malaysia Airlines aircraft engineers Teng Hua Kiet and Tan Tiong Keng were driving back home after completing their work shift at Subang International Airport, when they made a gruesome discovery along a secluded underpass located 5 km away from the airport.

Both Teng and Tan discovered a car parked near the road and also saw an Indian man lying unconscious (but still alive) on the road. As the two moved forward and got closer to the car, they discovered the body of an Indian woman with multiple stab wounds on her body and still strapped with a seatbelt inside the car itself. The woman, 31-year-old Jean Perera Sinnappa, was pronounced dead while the man, 36-year-old Karthigesu Sivapakiam, was taken to hospital. Both Tan and Teng were not the only ones who made the discovery. Two other witnesses – maintenance engineer Cheah Wei Keong and aircraft technician Abdul Wahab Anu Amin – also saw Karthigesu's body and/or the car when they drove home from the airport.

An autopsy by Dr R. Krishnan (Krishnan Ramanathan) certified that there were multiple knife wounds throughout the body of Jean Perera, and out of these various wounds, two were sufficient in the ordinary course of nature to cause death, as one of them was delivered onto the chest and another hit the stomach, which penetrated the right lung and liver respectively.

While in the hospital, Karthigesu, Jean Perera's brother-in-law who had a romantic relationship with the victim, whose husband had died in 1978, told the police that after a night outing, he drove together with his sister-in-law until he parked along the highway to relieve himself, but Karthigesu was knocked out by someone. However, no signs of head trauma were found on Karthigesu during any medical examination. After further investigations for another 20 days, Karthigesu was arrested as a suspect, and charged with murder on 9 May 1979.

Background information showed that Jean Perera, an ethnic Indian born in Negeri Sembilan who competed in several state and national beauty competitions (including Miss World Malaysia), was married to Sinnappa Sivapakiam, a chemist who was Karthigesu's brother. Sinnappa died from a car accident on New Year’s Eve in 1978; the location of the car accident was located near to where Jean Perera was murdered. Jean Perera, who became a widow and had to take care of her three children (whom she bore with Sinnappa), lived with her mother-in-law and Karthigesu, who was a psychology lecturer at the Special Teachers Training Institute in Cheras. The romantic relationship blossomed between Karthigesu and Jean Perera after the latter moved in with him and his mother, and by the time Jean Perera was murdered, both agreed to marry each other. Karthigesu also doted on his sister-in-law's children, who all likewise looked up to him as a surrogate father, and prior to his arrest, Karthigesu reportedly promised to take care of Jean Perera's children.

== Trial of Karthigesu Sivapakiam ==
In June 1980, 37-year-old Karthigesu Sivapakiam officially stood trial for the murder of Jean Perera Sinnappa. The prosecution was led by Deputy Public Prosecutor (DPP) T. S. Sambanthamurthi, while Karthigesu was represented by defence lawyer R. Ponnudurai. The trial was presided over by a seven-men jury and Justice Mohamed Azmi of the Kuala Lumpur High Court.

Throughout the 38-day trial, where 58 witnesses were called, the prosecution's case was that Karthigesu had murdered Jean Perera out of rage and jealousy after getting wind of her other romantic relationship with a Sri Lankan doctor Narada Warnasurya. The trial adduced evidence of several love letters exchanged between Dr Narada and Jean Perera as proof of the secret relationship between the both of them. There was an additional letter from Jean Perera to the doctor, which was never sent, and inside the letter, Jean Perera wrote to Dr Narada that she chose to stay with Karthigesu and would not marry Dr Narada, as her love for Karthigesu was stronger and she was anticipating a new future with Karthigesu and her three children (who were treated well by Karthigesu). Out of the prosecution's witnesses, Bandhulanda Jayathilake, a relative of Jean Perera and friend of Karthigesu, testified that Karthigesu allegedly told him that Jean Perera deserved to die due to the alleged relationship Jean Perera shared with Dr Narada, who declined to come to court as a witness. Adrian De Silva, a friend of the victim, testified he saw Jean Perera and Karthigesu together in their car when he was driving past them on the road, shortly before the murder happened.

In his defence, Karthigesu stated that he was unaware of the alleged romantic relationship between Dr Narada and Jean Perera until he was shown the letters exchanged between the two. He also stated that on that night itself, when he parked the car to relieve himself, he was attacked by a group of four men who forced him to watch Jean Perera being stabbed to death and threatened him to not tell the police about them or they would go after his family. The defence also argued that Karthigesu did not kill Jean Perera, given that there were no bloodstains or even specks of DNA or stains found on the clothes of Karthigesu when he was found, and the car itself was full of blood splatters and stains, which was impossible for his clothes to be this clean, and it was impossible for Karthigesu to kill his sister-in-law and clean himself up at the nearby stream within a short span of 17 minutes before the victim's body was discovered. Ng Kwai Yew, another witness for the defence, stated that he was driving on the road and witnessed two cars parked at the roadside where Jean Perera was found murdered, shortly before her body was discovered.

On 1 August 1980, after four hours and ten minutes of deliberation, the jury returned with their verdict. By a majority decision of five to two, the jury found Karthigesu guilty of murdering Jean Perera and recommended the mandatory death sentence. Justice Mohamed Azmi concurred with the jury's verdict and accordingly convicted Karthigesu of murder, and sentenced him to death by hanging.

== Acquittal of Karthigesu ==
While on death row at Pudu Prison, Karthigesu appealed against his conviction and sentence. While Karthigesu's appeal was pending before the Federal Court of Malaysia, in a dramatic twist of events, Bandhulanda Jayathilake, the prosecution witness who provided the crucial testimony that sent Karthigesu to death row, confessed that he lied under oath about Karthigesu threatening to murder Jean Perera and falsely implicated Karthigesu for the crime. Permission was granted for the court to adduce additional evidence from Jayathilake, who once again testified that he indeed lied to the trial court about Karthigesu's involvement in the crime, and he pointed fingers at Jean Perera's bereaved family as the ones who made him do the perjury.

Although the prosecution stated that the judge did not misdirect the jury and asked for the Federal Court to either affirm the conviction or order a new trial, the defence argued that with the evidence provided by Jayathilake deemed as inadmissible, the jury would not have enough evidence to consider a guilty verdict for Karthigesu, and added that a re-trial would lead to unnecessary channelling of resources to perpetuate the re-trial process while it was unsafe to return with a verdict of murder given that Jayathilake's evidence, which was the strongest link in the chain of evidence, was falsely made.

On 31 May 1981, the Federal Court allowed Karthigesu's appeal and granted him a full acquittal of the murder charge. The three appellate judges – Hashim Yeop Sani, Wan Suleiman and Abdul Hamid – found that there was insufficient evidence to connect Karthigesu as the killer of the case, especially since Jayathilake's original testimony at trial was being retracted and found to be falsely made under oath. Karthigesu was reportedly relieved at the acquittal, which was applauded in a packed courtroom, and he hugged his lawyer R. R. Chelliah (who represented him in the appeal) and shook hands with the prosecutor T. S. Sambanthamurthi. He also stated it was nice to be home after his family and friends welcomed him back.

Reportedly, when Jean Perera's mother heard that Jayathilake fingering her family as the one who put him up to it in committing perjury, she was shocked and stated that neither she nor her family members had directed Jayathilake to submit false testimonies in framing Karthigesu for the murder, and she also clarified they did not hold anything against Karthigesu, as they did not wish for another innocent person to die and leave it to the courts to decide on whether Karthigesu was truly guilty or not.

== Perjury conviction of Bandhulanda Jayathilake ==
Sometime after Karthigesu's acquittal, on 17 July 1981, 35-year-old Bandhulanda Jayathilake was found guilty of perjury and sentenced to ten years in jail by the Kuala Lumpur High Court, therefore becoming the first person in the whole of Malaysia to be convicted for perjury in a murder trial.

Jayathilake reportedly submitted a lengthy mitigation plea, and a letter reportedly penned down by Karthigesu was tendered in court, with Jayathilake's lawyer reading it and stating that the writer did not bear any ill will against Jayathilake despite what happened. However, Justice Ajaib Singh stated that Jayathilake was bound to speak the truth under oath while on the stand, but his actions were both disrespectful of the oath and an affront to the administration of justice, and he deliberately misled both the jury and judge into convicting an innocent person of murder, and it caused great damage and perversion to the course of justice and trial process. Pointing out Jayathilake's admission of finding the courage to speak the truth out of conscience, Justice Singh stated that Jayathilake should use the same courage to face and bear the consequences of his actions.

Jayathilake's appeal was dismissed on 23 September 1981, after the Federal Court of Malaysia stated that Jayathilake showed disregard for the truth and admonished him for acting with malice and perverting the course of justice by giving false testimony in a case where an innocent man like Karthigesu would have been hanged for a grave capital charge like murder. However, Jayathilake died in 1983 while serving his ten-year sentence.

== Current status ==
As of today, the murder of Jean Perera Sinnappa remains unsolved, and the killer(s) were never found.

Throughout the following decades, the murder remains one of Malaysia's most infamous cold cases.

== Aftermath ==
=== Fate of Karthigesu ===
After his release, Karthigesu, who returned to live in Klang, went on to marry another woman and had three children. He also got back his old job as a psychology lecturer. Karthigesu's wrongful conviction became an example of miscarriage of justice and the imperfectness of the judiciary, where a false testimony was used to convict a man of murder before Karthigesu was lucky enough to get away with it due to Jayathilake's admission that he lied under oath.

In his elderly years, Karthigesu suffered from poor health, including dementia and heart ailments. In early 2023, after contracting a short illness, Karthigesu was taken to a private hospital before he was discharged a few days later. On 27 August 2023, 44 years after the murder of Jean Perera Sinnappa, Karthigesu died at his home in Teluk Pulai, Klang, at the age of 81. He left behind his wife, two daughters and a son.

=== In popular media ===
Singapore-based British journalist Alex Josey wrote a book about the case, titled The Murder of a Beauty Queen. It was first published in 1984.

In 2014, a crime documentary titled Jean Perera: The Beauty Queen Murder was produced and broadcast on-TV.

In 2019, a book titled Malaysian Murders and Mysteries: A century of shocking cases that gripped the nation recorded Jean Perera's case as one of Malaysia's most shocking crimes to happen during its last 100 years in existence.

== See also ==
- Capital punishment in Malaysia
- List of unsolved murders (1900–1979)
