= Murder of Zara =

2018 rape-murder of a 11-month-old baby girl in Malaysia

Zara
- Zara, who was 11 months old when she died
- Born: Nur Muazara Ulfa Mohammad Zainal; 10 December 2017; Rantau Panjang, Kelantan, Malaysia
- Died: 9 November 2018 (aged 11 months); Serdang Hospital, Selangor, Malaysia
- Cause of death: Blunt force trauma to the head
- Other name: Zara
- Known for: Murder victim
- Parents: Muhammad Zainal Abduk Rahaman (father); Noraihan Ab Aziz (mother)
- Family: Muhamad Alif Zamani (brother)

On 7 November 2018, in Selangor, Malaysia, 11-month-old Nur Muazara Ulfa Mohammad Zainal (10 December 2017 – 9 November 2018), better known by her nickname Zara, was sodomized and raped by her babysitter's husband Hazmi Majid at Pangsapuri Sri Cempaka, Bandar Baru Bangi. She died two days later at Serdang Hospital due to injuries caused by lethal blunt force trauma. Hazmi was arrested following police investigations and therefore charged with murder and rape. It was uncovered during police investigations that Hazmi offered to help bathe Zara on the day in question. He took the chance to sexually assault the baby before killing her.

On 20 August 2021, Hazmi was found guilty of murder and sentenced to death by hanging. Before the verdict of death, Hazmi also pleaded guilty to rape in a separate court hearing in 2019 and given 20 years' jail and 12 strokes of the cane, although the jail term was lowered to 13 years after an appeal to the High Court. Hazmi's appeals against the death penalty were dismissed by the Court of Appeal and Federal Court on 1 March 2023 and 2 July 2024, respectively, and he is currently on death row awaiting his execution.

== Zara's death and investigations ==
On 9 November 2018, at Serdang Hospital in Selangor, Malaysia, an 11-month-old girl who was in critical condition died after being hospitalized for two days.

The girl, 11-month-old Nur Muazara Ulfa Mohammad Zainal, affectionately known as "Zara", was hospitalized on 7 November 2018 after she was taken to the Bandar Baru Bangi Clinic for supposed shortness of breath in the afternoon, before she was being referred to Serdang Hospital, where the doctors discovered tears on both Zara's hymen and anus. Upon Zara's death, an autopsy was conducted, and it was found that she suffered from a fractured skull, and bruises were also found on the top left and right sides of the baby's head. Before her hospitalization, Zara was entrusted to a babysitter by her mother, and she was reportedly in good health when the babysitter took her in at her house in Pangsapuri Sri Cempaka, Bandar Baru Bangi, before she suddenly became unwell.

The hospital authorities eventually suspected that the death of Zara was due to a possible crime, given that the medical evidence showed signs of sexual abuse and fatal head injuries, and therefore lodged a police report, and as a result, Zara's 28-year-old babysitter and her 36-year-old husband, a barber, were both arrested immediately on suspicion of causing the death of the baby, for which the case was classified as murder. Subsequently, the babysitter, who had a one-year-old son, was released on police bail, but her husband, who had tested positive for methamphetamine, remained in police custody. It was also uncovered that Zara's mother had been told by the couple that her daughter choked on an apple when they informed her of her daughter's hospitalization.

== Criminal charges and Hazmi's rape conviction ==
While he was in custody, the husband of Zara's babysitter was held in custody and probed on suspicion of raping and murdering Zara. Eventually, the suspect confessed that he had bathed the girl on the morning of 7 November 2018, the date of the alleged sexual assault, but he did not admit to any involvement in the murder or rape. Kajang police chief Ahmad Dzaffir Mohd Yussof of the Royal Malaysia Police confirmed that the police would continue to detain the suspect, and his remand order was extended on 19 November 2018. It was also found during investigations that the suspect had consumed drugs before he allegedly committed the sexual assault and murder of Zara.

On 23 November 2018, the suspect, 36-year-old Hazmi Majid, was arraigned on one count of murder at a magistrate's court in Kajang, and he pleaded not guilty to the charge. The following week on 28 November 2018, Hazmi once again appeared in court to face two counts of sexually abusing Zara by inserting his finger into the baby's private parts and anus, which attracts the maximum jail term of 30 years with caning for each charge. Hazmi pleaded guilty to both charges at the Kajang Sessions Court, where Justice Datin Surita Budin sentenced Hazmi to two concurrent jail terms of 20 years and six strokes of the cane for each count, equivalent to an aggregate sentence of 20 years' imprisonment and 12 strokes of the cane. The jail term was backdated to the date of Hazmi's arrest on 13 November 2018. The jail term was subsequently reduced to 13 years' imprisonment upon an appeal by Hazmi at the High Court, although he was still given 12 strokes of the cane.

However, Hazmi remained in remand pending trial for murder, and Section 302 of the Malaysian Penal Code mandated the death penalty for murder if found guilty. Two days before Hazmi's sentencing for sexual assault, Deputy Law Minister Mohamed Hanipa Maidin announced that Hazmi would not stand trial in the Sexual Crimes Court Against Children, since the case of Zara was classified as murder despite the presence of sexual violence, and he would be tried at a regular criminal court for the offence of murder.

== Hazmi's murder trial ==
Hazmi Majid
- Born: 1982 (age 43–44); Malaysia
- Status: Incarcerated on death row
- Convictions: Murder; Sexual penetration by object (two counts)
- Penalty: Death (murder); 13 years' imprisonment plus 12 strokes of the cane (sexual penetration by object)

Details
- Victims: Zara (deceased)
- Date: 7 November 2018
- Country: Malaysia
- State: Selangor
- Date apprehended: 13 November 2018

On 7 January 2020, 37-year-old Hazmi Majid stood trial at the Shah Alam High Court for one count of murdering 11-month-old Zara, and during the trial itself, which oversaw the testimonies of 22 prosecution witnesses and one defence witness before it ended on 7 April 2021, the prosecution was led by Deputy Public Prosecutor Datin Zuraini Abdul Razak while defence lawyer A Jeyaseelan represented Hazmi, and the trial was presided over by Justice Datuk Abdul Halim Aman.

The trial court was told that before 7 November 2018, the date of the sexual abuse, Hazmi's wife was appointed as the babysitter of Zara by the baby's mother, and Hazmi had not taken part in taking care of Zara. Yet, on the day in question, Hazmi offered to help bathe Zara, and while he was doing so, he proceeded to sexually assault her by using his finger to sexually penetrate her vagina and anus twice, and he subsequently inflicted several blows on her head, causing severe injuries that landed Zara into the hospital and resulted in her eventual death. The forensic pathologist Dr Emizam Mohamadon's post-mortem reports adduced during Hazmi's trial showed in detail that the cause of Zara's death was blunt force trauma to the head and skull, which led to signs of bleeding beneath the scalp and both the upper part and back of the brain, and a fractured skull. Furthermore, there were bruises on Zara's right arm that were consistent with adult bites and teeth marks, which indicated that Hazmi had bitten the girl during the course of the sexual assault. Hazmi, who denied abusing Zara or committing the murder, was the sole witness in his defence. He claimed that he was not himself at the time of the killing, as he consumed drugs before the crime and was under the influence of drugs at the time of the murder.

On 20 August 2021, four months after the trial concluded, Justice Datuk Abdul Halim Aman meted out his ruling. He found that there was sufficient evidence to prove Hazmi guilty of murdering the baby, and the defence had failed to raise a reasonable doubt over the prosecution's case. Before proceeding with the conviction and sentencing stage, Justice Abdul Halim harshly condemned Hazmi for having laid his hands on a harmless, innocent baby girl and he was unable to comprehend the torture and pain which Zara was forced to experience during the final two days of her life. The judge admonished Hazmi for being a "heartless" murderer devoid of feelings and labeled his actions as "inhumane", citing the violence and seriousness of the head and vaginal injuries suffered by Zara, and no words could be used to describe the sexual abuse mercilessly inflicted by Hazmi upon the girl. He further questioned Hazmi for killing a child even though he was a father to a son, and asked him how he would have felt if his son was the one being sexually abused and murdered like Zara was.

Apart from admonishing Hazmi for his heinous actions, Justice Abdul Halim also stated that the case of Zara's tragic death was a strong example and reminder for parents to be more mindful of engaging babysitters to care for their children, especially when the babysitter was in no way related to the child or children by blood, and background checks were necessary in hiring such individuals to take care of the children. Regardless, having duly considered the evidence and submissions tendered before him, Justice Abdul Halim found 39-year-old Hazmi Majid guilty of the murder of 11-month-old Zara, and sentenced him to the mandatory death penalty.

== Appeal process ==
=== Court of Appeal ===
On 1 March 2023, Hazmi's appeal against his conviction and sentence for murdering Zara was heard by three judges at the Court of Appeal. After hearing the submissions, the three judges – Justice Hanipah Farikullah, Justice Ahmad Nasfy Yasin and Justice See Mee Chun – unanimously dismissed Hazmi's appeal and upheld the High Court's verdict. Justice Hanipah stated in the judgement that the trial judge did not make any mistakes in facts and law in finding the appellant guilty as charged, and also cited that the head injuries found on Zara were sufficient in the ordinary course of nature to cause death under normal circumstances, based on Dr Emizam Mohamadon's post-mortem findings.

=== Federal Court appeal ===
A month after Hazmi lost his appeal, in April 2023, the Malaysian government officially abolished both natural life imprisonment and the mandatory death penalty. Under the revised laws, anyone convicted of murder would face either the death sentence or a lengthy jail term ranging between 30 and 40 years, and 936 out of over 1,000 people left on death row had appealed to reduce their death sentences at the Federal Court of Malaysia, the highest court of the nation.

Hazmi, whose appeal was pending before the Federal Court at the time of the abolition, was among the 936 inmates on Malaysia's death row to seek a review of his death sentence. On 2 July 2024, Hazmi's final appeal was brought before three judges for a hearing convened at the Federal Court. Defence lawyer T. Vijayandran, who represented Hazmi, submitted that his client was under the influence of drugs at the time of the murder and sexual assault, and continued to argue for his murder conviction to be overturned, and he additionally requested for Hazmi's death sentence to be commuted to 30 years' imprisonment, should the appellate judges decided that Hazmi should be convicted of murder as previously ruled.

However, the prosecution, led by Deputy Public Prosecutor Tetralina Ahmed Fauzi, urged the Federal Court to uphold the murder conviction and confirm the death penalty for Hazmi, seeking to argue that the murder of Zara was classified as one of the "rarest of the rare" cases of murder that deserved the death penalty, given that the victim herself was a defenceless baby weighed 8.26 kg and had not grown any teeth, and Hazmi tried to destroy evidence after the sexual and physical assault, which did not tally with his plea of intoxication, and it showed that he possessed a clear consciousness of his actions when he committed the offence of murder.

After hearing the submissions from both sides, the Federal Court aligned with the prosecution's stance and the three judges – Datuk Rhodzariah Bujang, Datuk Abu Bakar Jais and Datuk Vazeer Alam Mydin Meera – unanimously rejected 42-year-old Hazmi Majid's appeal, and thereby finalizing his death sentence and murder conviction for Zara's death.

As of 2024, Hazmi remains incarcerated on death row awaiting execution.

== Societal response and aftermath ==
When the sexual abuse and murder of Zara first came to light, many Malaysians were shocked by the brutality of the murder, especially when it emerged that a baby girl fell victim to sexual violence and murder, and countless netizens condemned the killer for such a cruel and hideous act. Particularly, this case became a center of public attention at the time when the Malaysian government was planning to abolish the death penalty, and many members of the public called for the government to not repeal the death penalty and agreed that Zara's murderer deserved to hang for the murder of the baby.

Despite the public calls and the public's majority support towards capital punishment, Minister in the Prime Minister's Department Liew Vui Keong rejected public calls to retain the death penalty, stating that it had already been made clear that the government would remove it after careful consideration and a moratorium on executions was ordered to enable the government to review its capital punishment laws. Liew also offered condolences to Zara's family. Eventually, the government's plans to completely repeal the death penalty were abandoned, and it was eventually decided in June 2022 that the death penalty would remain but it would no longer be mandatory for murder, and the changes were approved in April 2023.

In light of the murder of Zara, Ramkarpal Singh, a lawyer and son of the late Karpal Singh, affirmed that while he was in favour of abolishing the death penalty, he agreed that it should be imposed on people who commit serious crimes, including murder and rape, against children, although two human rights lawyers disagreed with Ramkarpal's proposal on the grounds that capital punishment was a "state-sanctioned murder" and unjustified even in the most heinous of crimes.

When her daughter was murdered, Zara's 22-year-old mother Noraihan Ab Aziz was devastated at the girl's death and she expressed that as long as her daughter's murder remained unsolved and the perpetrators responsible were not brought to justice, she would not be at peace, and she hoped that other parents could learn from her ordeal and be more wise in choosing babysitters for their children in the future. Noraihan, her 27-year-old husband Muhammad Zainal Abduk Rahaman and their four-year-old son Muhamad Alif Zamani (Zara's brother) brought Zara back to their hometown of Rantau Panjang, Kelantan, where they buried her at the town's local cemetery after a funeral.

During the first ten months of 2018 alone, the police received 86 reports of child abuse cases involving child caregivers, and it was analyzed that in most cases, care providers who lost their patience with children's mischievous behaviours often inflicted abuse on these children. The Royal Malaysia Police also announced that they would cooperate with the Social Welfare Department (SWD) to provide background checks on child caretakers, especially those with criminal records or dubious backgrounds, and also to monitor childcare centers to see if they were operating with registered valid licenses, and if they have former convicts working under the center.

When the murder of Zara was discussed in a parliamentary hearing, Barisan Nasional (BN) Member of Parliament Jalaluddin Alias asked if any course of action could be taken against Zara's parents, as the abuse could be a form of negligence by the parents on her safety. In response to Jalaluddin's inquiry, Hannah Yeoh, Deputy Minister of Women, Family and Community Development, said that it was too early to decide if the parents of Zara should be indicted for negligence or not, given that investigations were ongoing. Yeoh also called for parents to be more mindful of their children and check for any early warning signs of abuse to prevent any similar incidents from happening in the future. Deputy Prime Minister Wan Azizah Wan Ismail stated that any form of sexual violence towards female babies were not tolerated and should be met with severe retribution from the law, and she revealed that the Women, Family and Community Development Ministry was launching an infographic to help the public to learn how to identify the early signs of child abuse victims.

== See also ==
- Capital punishment in Malaysia
