= Jalan Turi murders =

1992 family mass murder in Malaysia

- Ariffin Agas, who was hanged in 2002 for the Jalan Turi murders
- Location: Jalan Turi, Taman Bukit Bandaraya, Kuala Lumpur, Malaysia
- Date: 23 April 1992
- Attack type: Murder
- Weapons: Chopping board Stones
- Deaths: 3
- Injuries: 1
- Victims: Deceased; Kabir Talwar (11); Arjun Talwar (7); Natalia Fernandes (45); Alive; Suneeta Talwar (38)
- Perpetrator: Ariffin Agas (25)
- Motive: Unknown
- Charges: 1st charge: Murder of Kabir Talwar; 2nd charge: Murder of Arjun Talwar; 3rd charge: Murder of Natalia Fernandes
- Verdict: Guilty of all three counts of murder Sentenced to death in 28 April 1994; Sentence upheld in 1999; Hanged on 27 December 2002
- Convictions: Murder (x3)
- Convicted: Ariffin Agas (25)
- Judge: Datuk Syed Ahmad Idid

On the night of 23 April 1992, at a bungalow in Jalan Turi, Kuala Lumpur, the capital city of Malaysia, an Indian-American family and their maid were attacked by their security guard. Although the matriarch of the family managed to escape the onslaught, the family's two sons – Arjun Talwar and Kabir Talwar – and their Filipino maid Natalia Fernandes (alias Natty) were brutally murdered by the guard, Ariffin Agas, who was arrested on the same day of the mass murder. Ariffin, who claimed that the victims were killed by a group of three Chinese men and denied all the charges, was found guilty of murdering the three victims and sentenced to death in March 1994. Ariffin's appeals were dismissed and he was hanged on 27 December 2002.

== Triple murder ==
On 23 April 1992, an Indian-American family (who came from New York) and their maid fell victim to a brutal attack initiated by their security guard.

When the attack first started just before midnight, 38-year-old Suneeta Talwar, whose 44-year-old husband Rakesh Talwar (a director of Colgate-Palmolive) was on a business trip to London, had just returned home from an outing with friends, and her two sons and the Filipino maid were also present at home. After she returned home, Suneeta was being attacked by their security guard. Suneeta, who was injured, barely escaped from her house alive and headed to a neighbour's house to seek help. A police report was lodged and the suspect was subsequently arrested at his post. Suneeta's two sons and her maid were nowhere to be found inside the house, but the house had bloodstains all over the place.

The three victims, identified as Suneeta's two sons – 11-year-old Kabir Talwar and seven-year-old Arjun Talwar – and her family's Filipino maid 45-year-old Natalia Fernandes (who was mistook for an Indian at first), were later found dead inside a septic tank, with their bodies being stacked up on top of each other one by one. The guard, who only began working for the family three days earlier, had led the police to the tank itself, and he was subsequently arrested for the murders, and Inspector Officer Sheridan Mohammad was put in charge of the investigations. Suneeta was also taken to Pantai Medical Center for treatment. Rakesh was notified of his sons' deaths while in London, and in the next two hours, Rakesh boarded a plane back to Malaysia with his friend and two psychiatrists to assess the situation. After the completion of post-mortem examinations, the remains of the Talwar brothers were later taken back to Bombay (present-day Mumbai) to be buried with final funeral rites.

On 8 May 1992, the 25-year-old security guard Ariffin Agas, who came from Kuala Lipis, Pahang, was officially charged in court with the murders of the two Talwar brothers and their maid. A preliminary hearing was carried out in July of that same year. The preliminary hearings concluded during that same month, after a magistrate's court ordered Ariffin to stand trial for all three charges of murder for the deaths of the Talwar brothers and Natalia.

The trial of Ariffin was originally scheduled to take place on 18 October 1993, before the trial was postponed and rescheduled on 10 January 1994.

== Trial of Ariffin Agas ==
On 10 January 1994, 26-year-old Ariffin Agas stood trial at the Kuala Lumpur High Court for the murders of the Talwar brothers and Natalia Fernandes. A single trial judge Datuk Syed Ahmad Idid and a jury of seven members, consisting of five men and two women, were appointed to preside over the murder trial. Under the past Malaysian laws, before the 1995 abolition of jury trials, should the jury found him guilty of murder, either by a majority or unanimous decision, Ariffin would be sentenced to the mandatory death penalty under Section 302 of the Malaysian Penal Code.

Forensic pathologist Dr Abdul Rahman Yusof of Kuala Lumpur Hospital, who conducted autopsies on the victims, testified that the victims had been bludgeoned to death with blunt instruments, although he could not conclusively find out the exact time of their deaths. In the case of seven-year-old Arjun Talwar, he died from bleeding in the brain due to multiple blows that fractured his skull and damaged his brain tissues. Arjun's older brother, 11-year-old Kabir Talwar, was hit multiple times on the face and head, which severely fractured the base of his skull and resulted in massive bleeding, and the mouth bled so much that blood clots had clogged Kabir's airways; Kabir's head injuries overall were sufficient in the ordinary course of nature to cause death. Forensic experts ascertained that from the five teeth of Kabir's found at the scene of the crime, extreme force had been used on the boy, so much so that his jaw was fractured and five of his teeth were dislodged, and none of his injuries were caused by a fall. Finally, for the death of Natalia, the blunt force trauma to her face was so lethal that it caused her face to fracture badly and her mouth to bleed profusely, and it flowed into her air passages, which completely prevented air from entering her lungs, which contained about 250cc of blood in them. Ariffin's lawyer K. Balaguru tried to raise doubts that the pathologist's reports were superficial and not properly made, an allegation which Dr Abdul Rahman denied. A chemist Dr Primulapathi Jaya confirmed that Ariffin's security uniform was stained with the blood of the victims.

The prosecution, led by Tun Abdul Majid Tun Hamzah and A. C. Fernandes, charged that Ariffin, for motives that remained unknown, had attacked the Talwar family and Natalia with a chopping board and stones and beaten them up, resulting in the deaths of the boys and maid before throwing their bodies inside a septic tank. The broken chopping board recovered at the scene were tested and the stains found on the board contained the DNA of the victims. Suneeta Talwar, the sole survivor of the case, testified that Ariffin had attacked her first by hitting her on the forehead and she was forced to flee the house alone.

Suneeta's evidence was corroborated by David Raymond Frediani, an insurance broker and Suneeta's neighbour whom she sought help from, as he testified that before the murders, Ariffin was the only person he saw roaming outside the house and David testified that he heard screams from the Talwars' house and Suneeta also told him that her security guard had attacked her. Wan Phen Martin, a neighbour of the Talwars, testified that she heard Suneeta, whom she befriended before, screaming for help and she also saw bloodstains at the house when she went to check the situation. Tay Su Lin, another neighbour of the Talwar family, similarly testified that she heard screams for help coming from the house at the time of the murders. Rakesh Talwar, who broke down in court while he testified, stated that he started employing security guards after a theft incident at his house in late 1990, and Ariffin was a relief guard assigned to his bungalow shortly before he left for London that same night when Ariffin murdered his sons and maid.

Ariffin's supervisor M Ramachandran also testified that soon after the murders, he saw Ariffin and picked him up from his car, and saw Ariffin throwing a knife out of the car, and Ariffin allegedly told him in Malay, "Saya terpaksa buat", which meant "I had to do it", indirectly referring to his involvement in the murders. Police corporal Majid Jaafar testified that Ariffin had led them to the place where the bodies were found after he questioned him where were the three victims.

However, in midst of Ariffin's trial, a trial-within-a-trial was conducted, as Ariffin's defence counsel tried to raise doubts that when he was first questioned by Corporal Majid over the murders, Ariffin was not in police custody and it was inadmissible with pursuant to Section 27 of the Evidence Act. Eventually, the trial court ruled that the statements were admissible as they were made while Ariffin was legally in police custody, and Corporal Majid was considered as a legitimate police officer when he questioned Ariffin over the murders.

At the close of the prosecution's case, the trial court ruled that a prima facie case was established against Ariffin, who was ordered to take the stand and put up his defence. Ariffin adamantly denied on the stand that he murdered Natalia and the Talwar brothers, claiming that it was group of three armed Chinese men who attacked and murdered the three victims, and he stated he was threatened by the men at gunpoint and knifepoint, and forced to help the trio to dispose of the victims' bodies. Ariffin claimed that he had no reason to commit murder to begin with, and he was none the wiser as to why the Chinese men killed the boys and maid. The prosecution sought to rebut that Ariffin was untruthful and concocted the existence of the three Chinese men to absolve him of his guilt.

On 28 March 1994, based on the seven-member jury's verdict issued two days earlier after more than four hours of deliberation, Ariffin was found guilty of all three counts of murder by a majority decision of six to one, and the jury recommended three mandatory death sentences, one for each count of murder which Ariffin was found guilty for. Justice Datuk Syed Ahmad Idid, in accordance with the jury's verdict, convicted Ariffin as charged after agreeing with their findings, and sentenced him to death by hanging.

In the judgement, Justice Syed Ahmad reiterated that this case should serve as an eye-opener for all security firms to check the emotional state of their charges and their criminal records, so as to ensure their aptitude and whether they qualified for the job.

== Appeal process ==
After he was sentenced to hang, Ariffin filed an appeal to the Court of Appeal against his conviction and sentence but the appeal was rejected on an unknown date. Afterwards, Ariffin further appealed to the Federal Court of Malaysia, the highest court of the nation.

On 17 November 1999, Ariffin's final appeal was rejected by the Federal Court. With this outcome, Ariffin's triple murder conviction and three death sentences were finalized.

== Execution ==
On 27 December 2002, ten years and six months after murdering the Talwar siblings and their maid, 35-year-old Ariffin Agas was hanged in Kajang Prison. On that same day, two other death row convicts were also put to death; one of them was Ghazali Mat Ghani, who was convicted and put to death for murdering a police constable Abdul Rahim Manan with a M16 rifle in 1994, while another was Mohd Alladin Talib, who was found guilty and executed for drug trafficking in 1993.

== Aftermath ==
The Jalan Turi murders was remembered as one of Malaysia's most brutal murders to take place. His motive for the murders remains unknown, but there were lingering suspicions that he harboured under a psychiatric disorder, although this was never confirmed.

Ever since the Murders in 1992, The House was still occupied for 3 Years, However it was eventually abandoned It was rumoured that the house was haunted by the ghosts of the victims. Many claimed to have seen ghosts or screams of children at the house itself, making it one of the most infamous haunted places in Malaysia.

In 2016, when a 20-year-old security guard was arrested for the rape-murder of 17-year-old schoolgirl Intan Suraya Mawardi in Penang, the case of Ariffin Agas came into attention again as the suspected killer was found to have been previously arrested for drug possession and housebreaking but never charged, and yet his employer had never submitted his details to the police for background checks. This was similarly observed in Ariffin's case as he was assigned due to the family wanting an English-speaking guard but his records did not show anything suspicious, and the judge having reiterated that the case should serve as an eye-opener for all security firms to check the emotional state of their charges and their criminal records. Intan's murderer Tarmizi Yaakob was subsequently found guilty of both rape and murder, and sentenced to death in 2019, before his death sentence was commuted to 33 years' jail and 12 strokes of the cane in 2023, after Malaysia repealed the mandatory death penalty and allowed those convicted of murder to face either a death sentence or a jail term of 30 to 40 years.

== See also ==
- Capital punishment in Malaysia
