= Strategic Trade Act 2010 =

Malaysian law against weapons of mass destruction

Parliament of Malaysia
- Long title: An Act to provide for control over the export, transhipment, transit and brokering of strategic items, including arms and related material, and other activities that will or may facilitate the design, development and production of weapons of mass destruction and their delivery systems and to provide for other matters connected therewith, consistent with Malaysia’s national security and international obligations.
- Citation: Act 708
- Territorial extent: Malaysia
- Passed by: Dewan Rakyat
- Passed: 5 April 2010
- Passed by: Dewan Negara
- Passed: 6 May 2010
- Royal assent: 2 June 2010
- Commenced: 10 June 2010
- Effective: 1 January 2011, P.U.(B) 559/2010

Legislative history

First chamber: Dewan Rakyat
- Bill title: Strategic Trade Bill 2010
- Bill citation: D.R. 04/2010
- Introduced by: Mohamed Nazri Abdul Aziz, Minister in the Prime Minister's Department
- First reading: 1 April 2010
- Second reading: 5 April 2010
- Third reading: 5 April 2010

Second chamber: Dewan Negara
- Bill title: Strategic Trade Bill 2010
- Bill citation: D.R. 04/2010
- Member(s) in charge: Liew Vui Keong, Deputy Minister in the Prime Minister's Department
- First reading: 26 April 2010
- Second reading: 6 May 2010
- Third reading: 6 May 2010

Keywords
- Nuclear proliferation, weapon of mass destruction
- Status: In force

The Strategic Trade Act 2010 (Malay: Akta Perdagangan Strategik 2010) is a law enacted by the Malaysia government in 2010 to control the export of sensitive technology and materials in order to combat terrorism, nuclear proliferation, and the spread of weapons of mass destruction.

The American government congratulated Malaysian Prime Minister Najib Razak on the legislation in an official statement from the White House.

== Structure ==
The Strategic Trade Act 2010, in its current form (as of 2010), consists of 6 Parts containing 57 sections and 1 schedule (including no amendment).

- Part I: Preliminary
- Part II: Appointment and Powers of Strategic Trade Collectors
- Part III: Control of Strategic Items, Unlisted Items and Restricted Activities
- Part IV: Permit and Registration
- Part V: Enforcement
- Part VI: General
- Schedule

== Regulation of strategic items, unlisted items and restricted activities ==
The written laws related to the regulation of strategic items, unlisted items and restricted activities are as follows:

1. Animals Act 1953 [Act 647]

2. Atomic Energy Licensing Act 1984 [Act 304]

3. Chemical Weapons Convention Act 2005 [Act 641]

4. Customs Act 1967 [Act 235]

5. Pesticides Act 1974 [Act 149]

6. Plant Quarantine Act 1976 [Act 167]

7. Prevention and Control of Infectious Diseases Act 1988 [Act 342]

8. Protection of New Plant Varieties Act 2004 [Act 634]
