= Kuching double murder =

2014 double murder of British medical students in Malaysia

- Aidan Brunger (left) and Neil Dalton (right)
- Date: 6 August 2014
- Location: Kuching, Sarawak, Malaysia
- Outcome: Zulkipli convicted of murder and sentenced to death in 2015; Zulkipli's appeal against conviction dismissed in 2015 and 2017; Zulkipli lost his appeal for re-sentencing in 2024
- Deaths: Aidan Brunger (22); Neil Dalton (22)
- Injuries: None
- Convicted: Zulkipli Abdullah (23)
- Verdict: Guilty of the double murder
- Convictions: Murder (×2)
- Sentence: Death

On 6 August 2014, two 22-year-old British medical students - Aidan Brunger and Neil Dalton - were attacked and stabbed to death in Kuching, Sarawak, Malaysia, where they were completing a six-week placement caring for patients in a local hospital of Sarawak. The Royal Malaysia Police investigated the case and arrested five suspects. One of these suspects, a local fishmonger named Zulkipli Abdullah, was charged with the double murder, which made international headlines as crimes against tourists in Malaysia were extremely rare.

After a short but highly reported trial that concluded in March 2015, Zulkipli was found guilty of murdering both Dalton and Brunger, and sentenced to death by hanging. The higher courts heard Zulkipli's appeals thrice between 2015 and 2024 and they were all dismissed. Zulkipli is on death row as of 2024, awaiting his execution.

== Double murder ==
On 6 August 2014, outside a bar in the Jalan Padungan area of Kuching, Sarawak, Malaysia, two British nationals Aidan Brunger and Neil Dalton, both 22, were stabbed and died from the attack.

Brunger, who lived in Kent, and Dalton, who lived in Ambergate, Derbyshire, were both students studying at the medical school of Newcastle University. Both men were on a six-week intern programme that sent them to Sarawak to work at a local Kuching hospital, and were set to complete the work placement in a few more days.

Witnesses said that outside the bar, Brunger and Dalton were attacked by a group of men, one of whom had earlier argued with the two Britons for being noisy. The same man, who gave chase with his friends, later stabbed Brunger after catching up with him outside a car repair shop before he pursued Dalton and killed him, stabbing him around 50m away from where Brunger collapsed. An autopsy revealed that Brunger died from a single stab wound on his chest while Dalton died from a total of four stab wounds, two on his back and two on his chest.

Dalton's brother Glen and his parents Jan and Phil Dalton fondly remembered Dalton as a "caring and thoughtful young man" who was a sports lover and avid cricket and football fan who made friends easily. About 500 family members, friends from school and Newcastle University attended Dalton's funeral at St Peter's Church in Belper. A month later, a charity cricket match was specially held by Dalton's favorite cricket team Belper Amateurs Cricket Club in memory of Dalton.

Brunger's parents Paul Brunger and Sue Hidson and his sister Amy also described him as a wonderful boy whose death left a massive hole in their lives, and called out his killers for the "senseless" murder. They were grateful to remember him as Dr Brunger after the university agreed to issue him a degree posthumously.

Tony Stevenson, the university's acting vice-chancellor who received news from the Malaysian police and later relayed it to the university, stated that the news of the killings was tragic and a blow to the school community. Reg Jordan and another staff member from the university travelled to Sarawak to provide support for their remaining students stationed in Sarawak. Jane Calvert, dean of undergraduate studies for Newcastle University Medical School, offered her condolences for the victims, who were noted to be hard-working students who left a good impression on friends and teachers around them. Residents of Kuching were shocked as it had been widely regarded as one of Malaysia's safest cities and crime against foreigners was extremely rare in Malaysia. A day after the double murder, many local residents of Kuching went to the murder scene to leave flowers as tribute for the two deceased Britons.

In light of the Kuching double murders, there was a huge public concern that the crimes against foreign tourists had been rising in Malaysia, the worst of which included the murder of Stephanie Foray, a French tourist who died on Tioman Island in 2011; a 39-year-old Malaysian shopkeeper named Asni Omar was found guilty of murder and sentenced to death earlier the same year when both Dalton and Brunger were murdered. Asni's sentence of death was later commuted to 36 years' jail and 12 strokes of the cane in July 2024 after Malaysia removed the mandatory death penalty in 2023 and legalized a sentence of either death or a jail term of 30 to 40 years for murder.

Both Brunger and Dalton were posthumously awarded honorary degrees by their university nine days after the occurrence of the Kuching double murder.

== Investigations ==
Within a day of the stabbings, the Royal Malaysia Police arrested four suspects. According to the police, the suspects were a 23-year-old fishmonger, a 29-year-old mechanic, and two unemployed men aged 19 and 35. Two were previously convicted of robbery and drug offences. A week later, a fifth male suspect, aged 55, was also arrested and remanded in custody pending further inquiries.

Deputy police commissioner Chai Khin Chung announced that the case had been solved with the arrests of the five suspected killers. The first four suspects had reportedly confessed to murdering both Dalton and Brunger. Police also revealed in a public statement that the first four suspects had consumed methamphetamine prior to the murders and were likely part of a drug-related gang.

It was later confirmed that only one of the suspects would be charged with murder, while the remaining four were re-classified as prosecution witnesses; three of them saw the crime, while the fourth helped dispose of evidence. The main suspect, a fish seller named Zulkipli Abdullah, was charged with two counts of murder at the Kuching Magistrate's Court on 19 August 2014.

At the time of his indictment, Zulkipli was a native of Kampung Gersik in Kuching and the only child of his parents, and his mother Fatimah Sauli reportedly pleaded for mercy on her only son. Under the Malaysian Penal Code, offenders convicted of murder would be sentenced to death.

== Trial of Zulkipli Abdullah ==
Zulkipli Abdullah
- Born: 1991 (age 34–35); Kuching, Sarawak, Malaysia
- Status: Incarcerated on death row since 2014
- Conviction: Murder (x2)
- Penalty: Death
- Accomplice: 4 (not charged)

Details
- Victims: Aidan Brunger (deceased); Neil Dalton (deceased)
- Date: 6 August 2014
- Country: Malaysia
- State: Sarawak
- Date apprehended: 6 August 2014

On 19 December 2014, the prosecution began to present their case after Zulkipli Abdullah went on trial for murdering Brunger and Dalton. On 6 February 2015, Zulkipli was ordered to enter his defence at the Kuching High Court, after the trial court ruled that the prosecution had successfully established a prima facie case against Zulkipli, and Zulkipli pleaded not guilty to both murder charges.

According to the prosecution's case, presented by Muhamad Iskandar Ahmad and Poh Yih Tinn, Zulkipli, who was hanging out with his friends at a Kuching bar, had told his friends that he wanted to "test his strength" against larger-sized, taller foreigners, and subsequently, he confronted both Dalton and Brunger at an all-night cafe for them allegedly being too noisy. Afterwards, when Brunger and Dalton decided to leave the cafe and walk back to their backpackers lodge about 2 km away between 4am and 4.15am, Zulkipli gave chase after the two men and was followed by his friends. Zulkipli caught up with the pair and callously knifed the two men to their deaths, and in the aftermath of the brutal stabbings, Zulkipli allegedly told a friend that the blood of white people smelt good. Zulkipli's friends were the same people arrested along with him.

Zulkipli, who was told to enter his defence on 4 March 2015, denied that he murdered Dalton and Brunger. Making an unsworn statement from the dock, Zulkipli had said he was involved in a fight with the British students but denied killing them, stating that he only punched one of the students while fighting the students with two of his friends but never used a knife to stab them. After Zulkipli completed his defence, the verdict was scheduled to be given on 31 March 2015. The prosecution argued in their closing submissions in rebuttal that the attack on the victims was unprovoked and there was no gang fight occurring as Zulkipli had claimed in his defence.

On 31 March 2015, Justice Chew Soo Ho of the Kuching High Court delivered his verdict. Justice Chew stated there was sufficient evidence to prove the charges of murder against Zulkipli beyond a reasonable The court had rejected Zulkipli's defence as "merely an afterthought" since the evidence showed that Zulkipli had deliberately attacked both Neil Dalton and Aidan Brunger with the intention of "testing their strength" and the testimonies of the prosecution witnesses were accepted by the judge. Having rounded up the aggravating and mitigating factors alike, the trial court was satisfied beyond a reasonable doubt that there were sufficient grounds to convict Zulkipli of murder. Hence, Zulkipli was found guilty of murder on both counts, and sentenced to the mandatory death penalty for each count. Zulkipli's lawyer confirmed that his client would appeal.

The families of Brunger and Dalton, who were all present at the court hearing, were reportedly satisfied with the verdict. Kieran Mitchell, a British lawyer who held a watching brief for both the families, released a statement from the families, stating that the verdict was fair and justice was served, even though it would not bring back the victims.

== Coroner's inquest in Britain ==
On 18 August 2014, the day before Zulkipli Abdullah was charged with the double murder, a coroner's inquest was conducted at a local coroner's court at the United Kingdom with information supplied by the Malaysian authorities. The decision was deferred due to the murder investigations still ongoing in Malaysia.

In October 2015, seven months after Zulkipli was sentenced to hang, a coroner's inquiry was conducted in Britain at a local coroner's court. Forensic pathologist Michael Biggs appeared in court to testify that the two men had sustained "sharp force injuries" as a result of the stabbings.

After hearing the case, Senior Coroner Robert Hunter of the Derby Coroner's Court recorded a verdict of murder, finding that the deaths were "unlawful killings" perpetuated by Zulkipli. The families of both men paid tribute in a joint statement, stating that they were satisfied with the coroner's verdict and also recalled the good memories spent with Dalton and Brunger, whom they described to be good future doctors with their past acts of kindness to others before they died.

== Appeal process ==
On 9 December 2015, the Court of Appeal of Malaysia rejected the appeal of Zulkipli Abdullah against his conviction and sentence.

On 17 May 2017, the Federal Court of Malaysia dismissed Zulkipli's final appeal, after a three-judge panel led by Tan Sri Ahmad Maarop unanimously determined that Zulkipli's double murder conviction and death sentences should be upheld.

== 2024 re-sentencing bid ==
In April 2023, the eighth year of Zulkipli's incarceration on death row, the Malaysian government elected to abolish both the mandatory death penalty and natural life imprisonment, and revised laws to allow those convicted of murder to face either the death penalty or a jail term of 30 to 40 years. This change took effect in July 2023 and more than 1,000 death row prisoners in Malaysia were allowed to apply for a reduction of their sentences. Zulkipli applied for re-sentencing, and the first round of re-sentencing began in November 2023.

Seven years after the Federal Court of Malaysia dismissed his final appeal, on 14 May 2024, Zulkipli's re-sentencing application was brought forward for hearing at the Federal Court. The prosecution argued that Zulkipli's death sentences should stay, given that he had, in a fit of anger, savagely and mercilessly wielded a knife to attack and kill two strangers from a foreign land and there was premeditation based on the use of knives in this case. The prosecution also cited that having committed the double murder "in such a gruesome, heinous, savage, vicious, violent and brutal manner", Zulkipli was clearly demonstrating "a blatant disregard for the sanctity of human life".

After hearing the submissions, the Federal Court of Malaysia dismissed Zulkipli's re-sentencing motion and finalized his two death sentences. The three judges - Datuk Rhodzariah Bujang, Datuk Nordin Hassan and Datuk Hanipah Farikullah - unanimously agreed that Zulkipli should hang for the double murder.

== Current status ==
According to Datuk Seri Azalina Othman Said during a parliamentary hearing in June 2024, out of 474 death row applications heard in Malaysia between November 2023 and 31 May 2024, 19 death sentences were finalized after their re-sentencing applications were rejected by the Federal Court. These 19 condemned - including Zulkipli Abdullah and Shahril Jaafar - were all convicted of murder, and most of them were either child killers or having killed more than one person.

== See also ==
- Capital punishment in Malaysia
