= Armed Forces Act 1972 =

Malaysian Act to consolidate various laws pertaining to Malaysia's armed forces

Parliament of Malaysia
- Long title: An Act to amend and consolidate the law relating to the establishment, government and discipline of the armed forces of Malaysia.
- Citation: Act 77
- Territorial extent: Throughout Malaysia
- Passed by: Dewan Rakyat
- Passed: 10 February 1972
- Enacted by: Dewan Negara
- Royal assent: 28 April 1972
- Effective: [1 June 1976, P.U. (B) 271/1976]

Legislative history

Initiating chamber: Dewan Rakyat
- Bill title: Armed Forces Bill 1971
- Introduced by: Tengku Ahmad Rithauddeen Ismail, Deputy Minister of Defence
- First reading: 8 December 1971
- Second reading: 10 February 1972
- Third reading: 10 February 1972

Revising chamber: Dewan Negara
- Bill title: Armed Forces Bill 1972
- Member(s) in charge: Minister of Defence (Malaysia)
- First reading: [ ]
- Second reading: [ ]
- Third reading: [ ]

Repeals
- Malay Regiment Enactment [F.M.S. Cap. 42] Federation Regiment Ordinance 1952 [Ord. 27 of 1952] Military Forces Ordinance 1952 [Ord. 47 of 1952] Navy Ordinance 1958 [Ord. 27 of 1958] Air Force Ordinance 1958 [Ord. 20 of 1958] Territorial Army Ordinance 1958 [Ord. 52 of 1958] Naval Volunteer Reserve Ordinance 1958 [Ord. 55 of 1958] Air Force Volunteer Reserve Ordinance 1958 [Ord. 58 of 1958]

Amended by
- Malaysian Currency (Ringgit) Act 1975 [Act 160] Armed Forces (Amendment) Act 1978 [Act A440] Armed Forces (Amendment) Act 1984 [Act A583] Armed Forces (Amendment) Act 1996 [Act A974] Armed Forces (Amendment) Act 2005 [Act A1243] Armed Forces (Amendment) Act 2015 [Act A1492] Abolition of Mandatory Death Penalty Act 2023 [Act 846] Armed Forces (Amendment) Act 2024 [Act A1735]

Keywords
- Malaysian Armed Forces
- Status: In force

Armed Forces Act 1972 (Malay: Akta Angkatan Tentera 1972), is a Malaysian law enacted to amend and consolidate laws relating to the establishment, government and discipline of the armed forces of Malaysia.

== Structure ==
The Armed Forces Act 1972, in its current form (15 June 2016), consists of 10 Parts containing 217 sections and 2 schedules (including 6 amendments).

- Part I: Preliminary
- Part II: The Regular Forces of Malaysia
- Part III: Commissioning and Appointment of Officers of the Regular Forces
- Part IV: Enlistment and Terms of Service for the Regular Forces
- Part V: Service Offences and Punishments
  - Offences in Respect of Military Service
  - Mutiny and Insubordination
  - Avoidance of or Failure to Perform Military Duties
  - Offences Relating to Property
  - Offences Relating to, and by, Persons in Custody
  - Navigation and Flying Offences
  - Offences Relating to Service Tribunals
  - Miscellaneous Offences
  - Punishments
  - Arrest
  - Summary Disposal of Charges
  - Courts-Martial: General Provisions
  - Courts-Martial--Provision relating to trial
  - Procedure
  - Confirmation, Revision and Review of Proceedings of Courts-Martial
  - Review of Summary Findings and Awards
  - Findings of Insanity
  - Savings for Functions of Judge Advocate General
  - Commencement, Suspension and Duration of Sentences
  - Execution of Sentences of Death, Imprisonment and Detention
  - Trial of Persons Ceasing to be Subject to Service Law and Time Limits for Trials
  - Relations between Service Law and Civil Courts and Finality of Trials
  - Inquiries
  - Miscellaneous Provisions
  - Interpretation
- Part VI: Pay, Forfeitures and Deductions
- Part VII: General Provisions
  - Powers of Command
  - Redress of Complaints
  - Provisions as to Ships under Convoy
  - Provisions as to Salvage
  - Provisions relating to Deserters and Absentees without Leave
  - Offences relating to the Armed Forces punishable by Civil Courts
  - Provisions as to Evidence
  - Miscellaneous Provisions
- Part VIII: The Regular Forces Reserve
- Part IX: The Volunteer Forces of Malaysia
- Part X: Application of the Act and Supplemental Provisions
  - Persons subject to Service Law under this Act
  - Application of the Act to Particular Forces
- Schedules

== See also ==
- Armed Forces Act
- Malaysian Armed Forces
