= Murder of Noor Suzaily Mukhtar =

2000 rape-murder of an engineer in Malaysia

Noor Suzaily Mukhtar
- Graduation photo of Noor Suzaily Mukhtar
- Born: Noor Suzaily binti Mukhtar; 9 June 1976; Kangar, Perlis, Malaysia
- Died: 7 October 2000 (aged 24); Bukit Tinggi, Klang, Selangor, Malaysia
- Cause of death: Strangulation
- Other name: Suzy
- Education: De Montfort University in United Kingdom
- Occupation: Student
- Employer: Pantai Medical Centre
- Known for: Victim of a rape-murder case
- Partner: Rudy Shahrin Abdul Rahman (fiancé)
- Parents: Mukhtar Ibrahim (father); Harisun Hussin (mother)
- Family: Three brothers

On 7 October 2000, 34-year-old Hanafi Mat Hassan, a bus driver previously charged for property offences and rape, attacked a female passenger on his bus, raping and murdering her at a secluded area near Bukit Tinggi, Klang in Selangor, Malaysia. The corpse of the victim, 24-year-old computer engineer Noor Suzaily Mukhtar, was later found at a construction site, and autopsy reports confirmed that she was raped and sodomized before her death via strangulation. Hanafi was arrested and charged with murder weeks after the crime. Hanafi was found guilty of murder and sentenced to death in April 2002 and additionally given a 20-year jail term with 12 strokes of the cane for rape. Hanafi's appeals were dismissed and he was hanged on 19 December 2008.

== Murder ==
On 7 October 2000, at Bukit Tinggi, Klang in Selangor, Malaysia, a 24-year-old female passenger was attacked by a bus driver while she was boarding her assailant's bus to work, and eventually found dead at a construction site.

Noor Suzaily Mukhtar (nicknamed "Suzy"), the third child of her family and graduate of De Montfort University, had just returned from the United Kingdom and took up a new job as a computer engineer when she was killed. On that day itself, Noor Suzaily left her residence, which she shared with a roommate, and went for work at a medical centre in Klang. Rosamliza Umar, Noor Suzaily's roommate, witnessed her leaving their home and that was the last time she saw her alive.

At the time she boarded the bus for work, Noor Suzaily was not alone. The bus driver and several other passengers were with her on the bus, although the other passengers left the bus and only the bus driver and Noor Suzaily remained on the bus. After the second-last passenger, a Bangladeshi national, alighted the bus, the driver suddenly changed route and drove the bus to Jalan Bukit Tinggi instead of the usual route heading to Noor Suzaily's workplace. As soon as the driver diverted his route, Noor Suzaily suspected something suspicious and thus called for help, but the bus driver assaulted her and tried to keep her silent. During the struggle itself, Noor Suzaily was overpowered by her captor, who raped and sodomized her.

During the assault itself, about four passers-by witnessed the bus and gave chase after witnessing a topless Noor Suzaily trying to get help and the bus driver warning the witnesses to go away. One of the witnesses was A. Devan, an 18-year-old student cycling to a tuition centre, and the other three were a motorcyclist, a man in his 50s, and a driving school instructor. The four men pursued the bus, which reached Taman Chi Liung, before it turned into Jalan Sambau. The driver subsequently noticed the four after stopping the bus at Jalan Sambau, and he reversed the bus before he drove the bus away again, back to Taman Chi Liung. After this, the bus driver arrived at a secluded area in Taman Bukit Tinggi, where he assaulted, raped and sodomized Noor Suzaily, before he used her hijab to strangle her to death.

After killing 24-year-old Noor Suzaily Mukhtar, the bus driver threw her naked body out of the bus and left it nearby the construction site. The body was only discovered by a passer-by later that afternoon and a police report was immediately lodged. An autopsy was conducted by forensic pathologist, Dr. Halim bin Mansar, from the Tengku Ampuan Rahimah Hospital, and Dr Halim certified that the death of Noor Suzaily arose as a result of ligature strangulation and blunt trauma to the head. Over 44 injuries were found all over the body, including a broken neck, and Dr Halim also confirmed that Noor Suzaily had been raped and sodomized before her death, and semen were found on the corpse. Her body was later returned to her family, and after a funeral, Noor Suzaily was buried at a cemetery in Kangar, Perlis, the place of her birth.

== Arrest of bus driver ==
Three days after murdering Noor Suzaily, the bus driver was arrested at a bus terminal station in North Klang, following extensive police investigations and the swift identification of the murderer. The driver, who confessed to the crime, brought the police to the drain where he had thrown away the victim's handbag, which contained her personal documents. The bag was still there. Hanafi was therefore scheduled to be charged in court on 1 November 2000 and he was remanded to assist investigations. Reportedly, the driver claimed that he could not resist raping the victim due to her beauty.

On 1 November 2000, close to a month after Noor Suzaily's death, the bus driver, identified as 34-year-old Hanafi Mat Hassan, was officially charged in court with both the rape and murder of Noor Suzaily. Under Malaysian law, a charge of murder warranted the mandatory death penalty, while the offence of rape carried the maximum jail term of 20 years with caning. Hanafi pleaded not guilty to the murder.

At the time of his arrest, Hanafi, a resident of Bachok, Kelantan, was married for the fourth time and bore three daughters from his previous three marriages (all ended with a divorce each). Coincidentally, on the same day when he murdered Noor Suzaily, Hanafi's fourth wife gave birth to a son, but the child was born prematurely and Hanafi's son died on the same day when his father was arrested for the murder of Noor Suzaily.

It was further revealed that Hanafi was wanted in 1988 by the state authorities of Pahang for having raped one of his ex-wives in Mentakab, Pahang. Hanafi had also appeared in court in 1994 for a charge of criminal breach of trust in Subang Jaya, Selangor, and he was convicted in 1996 of robbery with hurt in Chukai, Terengganu and served 30 months in prison (plus two strokes of the cane) for this offence. Hanafi was only employed by the bus company merely ten days before the crime itself.

== Trial of Hanafi Mat Hassan ==
Hanafi Mat Hassan, who was sentenced to death in 2002 for murdering Noor Suzaily Mukhtar.

On 12 March 2001, Hanafi Mat Hassan stood trial at the Shah Alam High Court for the rape and murder of Noor Suzaily Mukhtar. Over 55 witnesses were summoned to court to testify for the prosecution and defence during the 62-day hearing. The forensic evidence showed that Hanafi's DNA matched to the semen found on the victim. At one point, Hanafi's lawyer wanted to stop defending him.

However, Hanafi argued in his defence that he did not kill or rape Noor Suzaily. While testifying on the stand, Hanafi did not deny that he was the driver of the bus that Noor Suzaily last boarded, and he admitted to fetching a woman who told him she was going to a medical centre in Klang, whom he referred to as Noor Suhaily. Hanafi said that the woman alighted the bus and it was an acquaintance of his who boarded his bus as the last passenger. Hanafi said he was chatting with the same friend when he nearly knocked down the 18-year-old student A. Devan, who earlier appeared as a prosecution witness, and Hanafi had to drive the bus away to avoid being beaten after seeing a group of men armed with iron rods and sticks chasing after his bus.

On 26 April 2002, after a trial lasting 64 days, Justice Mohd Hishamudin Md Yunus delivered his verdict. In his judgement, Justice Mohd Hishamudin stated that he did not accept Hanafi's defence, pointing out that he failed to explain why his semen was found on the victim or how the victim's missing penchant came to be in his possession, and the story he gave on the stand was overall unsatisfactory and cannot be relied on. Given the incriminating evidence against Hanafi, Justice Mohd Hishamudin determined that there were sufficient grounds to return with a guilty verdict of murder in Hanafi's case.

Hence, 36-year-old Hanafi Mat Hassan was found guilty of the first charge of murder and sentenced to the mandatory death penalty, and for the second charge of rape, Hanafi was similarly found guilty and given a 20-year jail term with 12 strokes of the cane. Noor Suzaily's 30-year-old brother Muhammad Muhairiss and a male friend Shahrin Abdul Wahid were present at the courtroom, and Noor Suzaily's brother was satisfied with the verdict. In response to her ex-husband's sentence, one of Hanafi's former wives stated she did not want her children to know about the case, and asked that her ex-husband to be quickly put to death for murdering Noor Suzaily.

== Appeal ==
After he was sentenced to hang, Hanafi Mat Hassan appealed against his conviction and sentence. On 13 August 2005, the Court of Appeal rejected the appeal of Hanafi against the trial verdict.

On 12 December 2006, the Federal Court of Malaysia, the apex court of the nation, dismissed Hanafi's appeal and upheld his conviction for both rape and murder, as well as confirming both the 20-year prison sentence and death penalty in his case. Hanafi reportedly assaulted some of the reporters trying to take his picture; Hanafi had only one final recourse to escape the gallows by appealing for a royal pardon from the Sultan of Selangor.

Hanafi's 80-year-old mother was reportedly saddened by the actions of her son, who was the seventh of her eight children, and when Hanafi lost his appeal, she said no one was above the law and that was the consequence her son had to bear for such a heinous crime, and she wanted to apologize to Noor Suzaily's family for her son's crime. Noor Suzaily's family were still grieving over her death, but they were satisfied with the dismissal of Hanafi's final appeal.

== Execution ==
On 19 December 2008, eight years after the murder of Noor Suzaily Mukhtar, 42-year-old Hanafi Mat Hassan was hanged at dawn in Kajang Prison. Hanafi's body was taken to Kajang Hospital for an autopsy before it was returned to his family, who brought it back to his hometown in Binjai, Kelantan. His remains were buried at Kampung Kubur Datu cemetery in Binjai.

When the news of Hanafi's execution reached Noor Suzaily's family, her father was glad and relieved to hear that the death sentence had been carried out on his daughter's killer, and felt that justice was served and he never forgave Hanafi for taking his daughter away. He did however, express sympathy for Hanafi's family as they were in no way involved in the rape-murder of Noor Suzaily.

== Aftermath ==
The murder of Noor Suzaily Mukhtar made headlines and caused much shock to the public, and many, including then-Prime Minister Mahathir Mohamad, condemned Hanafi Mat Hassan for his heinous acts. In the aftermath, there were proposals that every bus should have their windows changed to larger ones rather than tinted glass, which may avoid crimes going undetected while happening inside the buses. In addition to the public anger over the rise in sexual violence against women, the public were more riled with anger when new cases of rape and similar murders (including the rape-murder of Nor Shuhada Borak) happened during the same month when Noor Suzaily was killed, although the police reassured the public that the sudden spate of such crimes did not show an increasing trend in rapes in the country. The case also raised the issue of accepting electronic evidence, such as recorded footage, as court evidence in convicting an accused in court.

Not only were there greater calls to protect women from sexual crimes, the case of Noor Suzaily's murder also gave rise to the women's groups' calls for stricter laws to handle rape cases, and attention was constantly renewed on the case whenever brutal rape-murders happened in subsequent years. There were also measures introduced to register bus drivers with criminal records as a crime prevention measure.

When the mandatory death penalty was set for abolition in Malaysia in 2022, the case of Noor Suzaily's death was discussed as one of the cases where the topic of abolishing capital punishment was concerned. Gerakan secretary general Mak Kah Keong expressed support for the abolition, but expressed that there was a greater need for scrutiny on the matter, stating that capital punishment should still remain for certain cases that were particularly heinous and called for such a high penalty, such as the Noor Suzaily case and the 2003 rape-murder of Canny Ong, and it would be able to achieve the true purpose of justice for the victims. The abolition of mandatory death sentences was approved in April 2023, allowing those convicted of murder to face either the death penalty of a jail term of 30 to 40 years.

== See also ==
- Murder of Canny Ong
- Murder of Ang May Hong
- Rambo Bentong murders
- Murder of See Sheau Fang
- Chee Gaik Yap rape and murder
- Capital punishment in Malaysia
