= Murder of See Sheau Fang =

2004 rape-murder of a teenage girl in Malaysia

See Sheau Fang
- See Sheau Fang, pictured before her death
- Born: See Sheau Fang c. 1986; Malaysia
- Died: 26 February 2004 (aged 18); Sijangkang, Kuala Langat, Selangor, Malaysia
- Cause of death: Strangulation
- Education: Secondary school education in Malaysia
- Occupation: Student
- Known for: Murder victim
- Parent(s): See Soon Thiam (father); Unnamed mother
- Family: Two brothers One sister

On 26 February 2004, 18-year-old See Sheau Fang (Chinese: 徐晓芳; pinyin: Xú Xiǎofāng) was last seen by her sister at Sijangkang in Kuala Langat, Selangor, Malaysia, boarding the car of a male acquaintance. See's family reported her missing and the police investigated her disappearance. They traced the car registration numbers to a man named Kher Tian Hock (or Kher Thien Hock; Chinese: 寇天福; pinyin: Kòu Tiānfú), who knew the victim, the police questioned him but he denied knowing See's whereabouts. However, when the police questioned Kher's younger brother Kher Then Heng (Chinese: 寇天兴; pinyin: Kòu Tiānxīng), he informed them that he witnessed his brother killing See and burying her body in front of his friend's house. Upon receiving this information, the police went to the friend's house, where they found See's corpse beneath a concrete floor.

The Kher brothers were subsequently arrested and charged with murder, and Kher Tian Hock confessed that he requested to have sex with See, who rejected his advances and he therefore raped and strangled See. However, before he could stand trial, Kher escaped from the police lockup in March 2004, while Then Heng was left pending trial for murder. Then Heng was later acquitted due to insufficient evidence to convict him, and Kher Tian Hock himself remained on the run for more than seven years before he was arrested by the police in October 2011 for a vehicle theft case, and charged for See's killing. In May 2015, about 11 years after raping and murdering See, Kher was convicted of the murder and sentenced to death.

Between 2016 and 2024, Kher appealed to the higher courts against his death sentence and murder conviction. However, none of his appeals succeeded, and Kher is on death row awaiting his execution.

== Disappearance of See Sheau Fang ==
On the night of 26 February 2004, at Sijangkang in Kuala Langat, Selangor, Malaysia, 18-year-old Form 5 student See Sheau Fang, who had just completed her Sijil Pelajaran Malaysia (SPM) examinations and waiting for her exam results, went out for tea with a male friend. Not long after, See's sister saw her entering a white car.

When See had not return home by the following day, her family searched for her. See's father See Soon Thiam (徐顺添 Xú Shùntiān) filed a police report to report his daughter's disappearance, and had also sought help from Datuk Seri Michael Chong of the Malaysian Chinese Association (MCA) to search for his daughter. About 500 residents took part in the search for See around the neighbourhood.

Not long after reporting his daughter missing, See's father received a phone call from an unknown caller, who informed him that he had kidnapped See and demanded a ransom of RM40,000 in return for her release. The father dropped off the ransom at a location in Klang but she did not return home. Background checks revealed that See had been harassed by a man on the phone and stalked by the same harasser.

== Investigations ==
During the police's investigations, See's sister told the police that she saw the license plate numbers - "5678" and "Max 3" - on the car See left in. The police traced the car registration numbers to a 29-year-old car repairman named Kher Tian Hock, who was brought in for questioning. Kher, who was detained for one week, denied that he was involved in the disappearance of See. The car license numbers were later found to be forged.

Simultaneously, the police also found the car that bore the registration numbers, and detained its driver, who was 26-year-old Kher Then Heng, the younger brother of Kher Tian Hock. After he was brought in for questioning, Then Heng informed the police that See was already dead, and that her body was buried in front of a friend's house under concrete.

On 8 March 2004, two weeks after See went missing, the police were led by Then Heng to a house in Kuala Langat, where they detected a strong odour, and began to dig at the concrete floor. The police spent 14 hours to excavate the concrete floor and dug up a decomposed body of a female. The deceased's head was wrapped up in a plastic bag tied with rope around her neck, her body was covered with a blue blanket and plastic, and her hands were tied. The body was buried at the hole for at least four days, and the deceased was speculated to have died at least five days previously.

The corpse was transported to the Tengku Ampuan Rahimah Hospital, Klang, for post-mortem examinations. DNA testing later confirmed that the body belonged to 18-year-old See Sheau Fang, and her father See Soon Thiam similarly identified his daughter after seeing the clothes and earpin worn by the deceased. An autopsy established strangulation as the probable cause of death, and it was confirmed that there were semen on See's private parts, suggesting that she had been raped by her killer(s) before her death. The news of See's death caused distress to her family, especially her mother, who stated she had lost the will to live after hearing of her daughter's death. Neighbours stated they did not think anything suspicious about a backhoe digging a hole outside the house.

The house owner and his three sons were all apprehended, and it was found that they were innocent in the end. However, the house owner told the police that he was a friend of Kher Tian Hock, who, on 26 February, had asked him if he could stay at his house for a few days with his new girlfriend, whom the owner identified as See. During the next day, the house owner saw only Kher remained at his house, and when he asked where See was, Kher told him that she had left the following morning after the couple argued over a small misunderstanding. The house owner told the police that Kher offered to help him cast a new layer of concrete for free on his front yard to help him park his car better. The house owner agreed and was unaware of See's death.

This allowed the police to arrest Kher as the prime suspect for the murder of See Sheau Fang. He and his brother Then Heng were remanded after their indictment for the case.

== Kher Tian Hock's confession ==
Kher Tian Hock
- Born: 1975 (age 50–51); Malaysia
- Other names: Ah Hock; Gan Wei Chen
- Status: Incarcerated on death row
- Conviction: Murder
- Penalty: Death
- Accomplices: Kher Then Heng (brother; acquitted)

Details
- Victims: See Sheau Fang (deceased)
- Date: 26 February 2004
- Country: Malaysia
- State: Selangor
- Date apprehended: 14 October 2011

After his arrest, Kher Tian Hock confessed to murdering See Sheau Fang on the night when she was last seen alive.

Kher admitted that on the night of See's disappearance, he and See had gone to a friend's house to spend the night. Kher, who admitted to having sexual fantasies that involved violence, told the police that after they were together inside a room, he requested to have sex with See, but See declined. Angered that he was rejected by See, Kher forcibly had sex with her and strangled her to death. After, Kher did not immediately dispose the body as he was fearful that he might be seen if he took the body out of the house.

Kher decided to bury See's body in concrete at the front yard outside his friend's house. He offered to help his friend to lay a new patch of concrete on the yard, and lied to his friend that See had left the morning after the couple had argued over a small misunderstanding. While his friend was not at the house, Kher paid someone to dig a hole with a backhoe and hide See's corpse inside the hole, and covered it in concrete. Kher's brother was informed about the murder thereafter.

Prior to the murder, Kher was on the wanted list for a gang-rape incident. In 1999, Kher and three other men had gang-raped a 19-year-old girl and took nude pictures of her. Kher and his accomplices were arrested and later convicted of rape charges in 2003 and was scheduled to be sentenced on a later date. However, on the same date he was supposed to be sentenced, Kher, who was then out on bail, absconded and went into hiding in Selangor while the police put up a public warrant for his arrest; the police did not know of this until he was caught in 2004 for killing See.

== Kher's escape and brother's acquittal ==
On 13 March 2004, after he was charged for See Sheau Fang's murder and confessed to it, Kher Tian Hock remained in remand at the lock-up section of Tanjung Sepat Police Station. During the morning itself, before breakfast, Kher asked the officers for permission to use the restroom. This turned out to be a ruse, as Kher took the opportunity to enter the toilet, and escaped the police station through the ceiling. After Kher disappeared, the police placed Kher on the wanted list and sent out public appeals for information of his whereabouts. A monetary reward of RM5,000, later increased to RM40,000, was offered for his capture. See's family were concerned that Kher would go after them out of revenge.

Kher went on to spend seven years and seven months on the run from the law. During that period, Kher had either gone into hiding at Indonesia or other states in Malaysia, and he acquired a fake identity. Despite the police placing him on top of the wanted list, Kher often secretly visited his family, showed up at his sister's hair salon several times to visit her, and deliberately appeared at the crime scene. At one point, when the police detained and questioned Kher's wife, who knew his whereabouts but never reported him, Kher sent in a letter to threaten the police that he would come to the police station with a gun to save his wife. Meanwhile, there were also rumours about what possibly happened to Kher while the public was unaware of his whereabouts, including an allegation that a gunman killed by police during a gunfight in Kuala Lumpur was most likely Kher, which was refuted by the police.

The escape of Kher Tian Hock resulted in Then Heng being the remaining suspect left pending trial for the murder of See Sheau Fang. Although Then Heng stood trial by late 2007 for the murder (delayed by three years due to the backlog of criminal cases), he was acquitted on 24 January 2008 by Justice Datuk Zaharah Ibrahim, after the judge ruled that the prosecution had failed to establish a prima facie case against Then Heng and there was no "clear involvement" of Then Heng in See's murder. However, after his acquittal, Then Heng was once again indicted and detained for an unrelated rape charge. Soon after Then Heng was acquitted, Deputy Public Prosecutor (DPP) Badius Zaman Ahmad said in his report to the Attorney–General's Chambers, confirming that there would be no appeal against Then Heng's acquittal, as the evidence against him was insufficient to prove his responsibility behind the murder, and none of the semen samples or DNA samples collected were a match to Then Heng's DNA profile.

In February 2008, nearly four years after Kher fled, See's family were approached by the media. See's father told the reporters that he no longer believed in anyone, including the police, government or media, and his family were still grieving for his daughter. See's father said that he was disappointed when Kher, whom he personally handed over to the police, escaped and Then Heng did not face the gallows for his daughter's murder, although it was a small consolation to know that Then Heng was in prison for rape. The See family had to move away from their family home in Sg Jarum to Taman Melati in Jenjarom three years ago to start afresh. A police spokesperson Supt Zulkifli Mohamed, the Kuala Langat police chief, vowed in a public statement that Kher would be brought to justice for the murder of See and the police would not give up searching for him.

== 2011 arrest and murder trial ==
On 14 October 2011, the police arrested two suspects for stealing a vehicle in Masai, Johor, and as they investigated the case, it turned out that one of these two suspects was the fugitive Kher Tian Hock. The re-arrest of Kher effectively ended his seven-year long run from the law. At the time he was caught, Kher initially tried to escape detection by introducing himself by his alias "Gan Wei Chen" (颜伟成 Yán Wĕichéng), but his identity card turned out to be fake.

Upon his arrest, Kher, who claimed to be suffering from cancer, was brought to court to be charged with murder and escaping police custody. To prevent him from escaping again, armed officers were assigned to escort and guard during his court appearances, during which he made taunting faces at reporters while they were photographing him. During his detention, Kher was conferred to Kajang Hospital for medical consultation at one point, and he nearly escaped from the police before they caught him.

Kher was held in remand for the charge of murder (which carried the death penalty) but he faced trial first for the lesser charge of escaping from judicial custody, and he admitted to the said charge, and sentenced to the maximum two years' imprisonment for this offence. Kher also claimed to the court that he had bribed two police officers to allow him to escape from the prison where he was remanded back in 2004, and asked for leniency as he had five children to feed. Kher even got permission to file a complaint against two policemen who allegedly received bribes from him in exchange for his freedom.

Kher's murder trial took place at the Shah Alam High Court after around three years since his re-capture in October 2011. While the prosecution called on 23 witnesses to prove their case against Kher, the defence called on only one witness, and when he was called to enter his defence, Kher denied that he was involved in the murder despite his confession back in 2004.

On 13 May 2015, the trial judge, Justice Datuk Ghazali Cha, found that Kher had intentionally murdered See after he failed to have sex with her, and his reasons of helping his friend to cover concrete on his friend's house was an excuse to cover up the crime, and in response to Kher's claim that he escaped jail to avoid a murder attempt, the judge refuted it and pointed out that the only reasonable inference of Kher's escape was that he wanted to avoid justice.

On these grounds and other factors duly considered, the judge found Kher guilty of the murder of 18-year-old See Sheau Fang, and sentenced him to death. In response to the verdict of death, See's father stated that it was a relief for him and his family, including his two sons and only remaining daughter and See's 70-year-old grandmother, and they still missed her even after 11 years since her death, and they felt that justice had been served.

== Appeal process ==
On 28 January 2016, the Court of Appeal unanimously dismissed Kher Tian Hock's appeal, after a three-judge bench led by Justice Datuk Tengku Maimun Tuan Mat concluded that Kher had the intention to kill See Sheau Fang, and found that there was no error on the trial judge's part in convicting Kher of murdering See.

After the Court of Appeal dismissed his appeal against his death sentence, the final legal avenue for Kher to appeal was to seek an appeal hearing from the Federal Court of Malaysia, the highest court of Malaysia. However, on 6 December 2016, the Federal Court dismissed Kher's final appeal and upheld his death sentence.

== 2024 re-sentencing bid ==
Two years after Kher lost his appeal to the Court of Appeal, while he was still incarcerated on death row, the Malaysian government announced in October 2018 that they would abolish the death penalty, although they later revised their stance and finalized their plan to make the death penalty discretionary and it would no longer be mandatory for all offences. The mandatory death penalty was eventually repealed in April 2023, and under the revised laws, anyone convicted of murder would face either the death sentence or a lengthy jail term ranging between 30 and 40 years, and 936 out of over 1,000 people left on death row had appealed to reduce their death sentences at the Federal Court of Malaysia.

Kher Tian Hock was one of the 936 death row prisoners to appeal for re-sentencing. His application was heard at the Federal Court on 9 July 2024. During the hearing of Kher's appeal, the defence lawyer Hasnan Hamzah argued that the murder of See was not among the "rarest of rare" murder cases where the death penalty was definitely called for. Hasnan submitted that Kher was remorseful and having turned to Islam and devoted himself to his newfound faith, he was no longer the same man who had cruelly taken a life 20 years ago, and he deserved a second chance. However, the prosecution, led by Deputy Public Prosecutor (DPP) Roshan Karthi, argued that the death penalty should remain in Kher's case, stating that the conduct of Kher was deplorable and inhumane, and there was premeditation behind the murder and subsequent burial of See's corpse, and DPP Roshan pointed out that the impact of See's family was so devastating that back in 2008 per a news report, See's father told the press that his family's lives were never the same again after losing See. In summary, the prosecution urged the court to uphold the death sentence for the sake of public safety and deterrence.

In the end, the Federal Court sided with the prosecution, and they elected to reject Kher's re-sentencing application and confirmed his death sentence, resulting in 50-year-old Kher Tian Hock losing his final chance to evade the gallows. On that same day when Kher failed his appeal, two other convicted murderers – Bentong serial killer-rapist Rabidin Satir and Muidin Maidin (who murdered a five-year-old girl nicknamed "Dirang") – also lost their final appeals to overturn the death penalty.

As of 2024, Kher Tian Hock remains on death row awaiting his execution, which had not been scheduled.

== Aftermath ==
In the aftermath of the murder, the house where See's body was formerly buried was auctioned by a bank. It was being converted into a place for people to store cardboard.

From September 2017 to April 2018, local Chinese-language newspaper China Press began to publish a special series of real-life crime stories, covering the 30 most horrific crimes that happened in Malaysia since the 1970s and updated every Friday. The murder of See Sheau Fang was recorded as the 15th volume of the China Press crime story series.

The murder of See Sheau Fang was known to be one of Malaysia's most notorious murder cases in recent years to date. It was discussed in 2020 in light of the question of whether or not Malaysia should abolish the death penalty.

== See also ==
- Murder of Canny Ong
- Murder of Ang May Hong
- Rambo Bentong murders
- Chee Gaik Yap rape and murder
- Capital punishment in Malaysia
- List of kidnappings
- List of solved missing person cases (post-2000)
