= Mount Tok Wan =

Mountain in Selangor, Malaysia

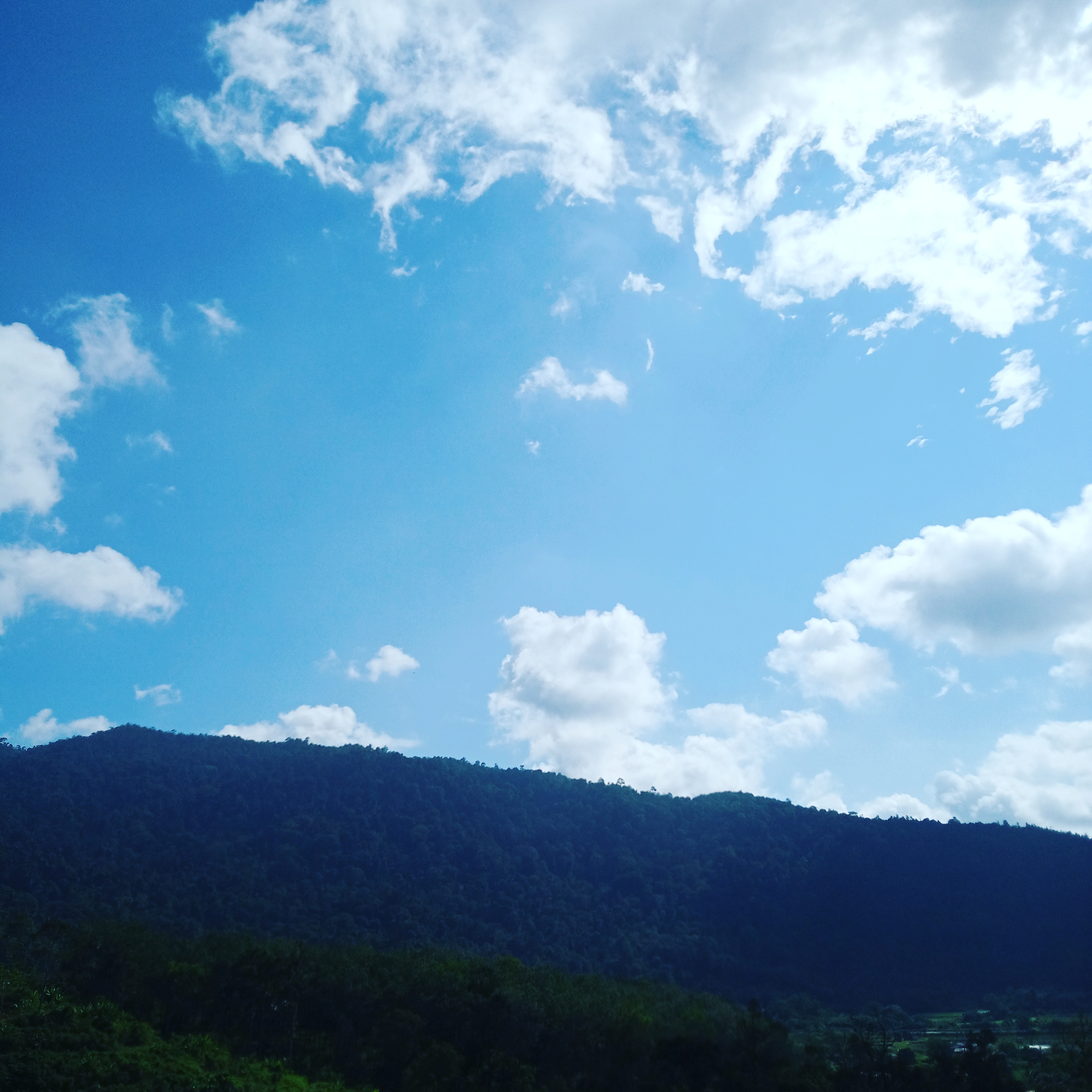
- Mount Tok Wan, viewed from the northwest

Highest point
- Elevation: 675 m (2,215 ft)
- Coordinates: 2°57′53″N 101°54′48″E

Naming
- Native name: Gunung Tok Wan (Malay)

Geography
- Location within Malaysia
- Location: Hulu Langat District, Selangor
- Parent range: Titiwangsa Mountains

Climbing
- First ascent: 2010 by a small group of officers from Kajang Prison
- Easiest route: Hiking

Mount Tok Wan (Malay: Gunung Tok Wan) is a mountain located on the summit of Broga Hill in Semenyih, Hulu Langat District, Selangor, Malaysia, close to the border with Negeri Sembilan. It rises to 675 m (2,215 ft) at its peak.

The mountain is reported to have been discovered by a group of officers from Kajang Prison in 2010. The hike up Gunung Tok Wan is rated moderate to hard. Hikers must first summit Broga Hill before continuing up Mount Tok Wan.
