= Murder of Dirang =

2012 abduction, rape and murder of a girl in Malaysia

Nurul Nadirah Abdullah
- Dirang, who was abducted, raped and murdered in 2012
- Born: Nurul Nadirah Abdullah c. June 2007; Malaysia
- Died: 1 March 2012 (aged 4); Bandar Seri Alam, Masai, Johor, Malaysia
- Cause of death: Asphyxiation
- Resting place: Kampung Pertanian Masai Muslim Cemetery
- Other name: Dirang
- Known for: Victim of a rape-murder case
- Parents: Handry Yangot (father); Roselyn Alan (mother)
- Family: Lima Anak Medang (stepfather); Milnah Jul (grandmother); Alan Alip (grandfather); Mohd Hafiz Abdullah (brother)

On 1 March 2012, in Johor, Malaysia, four-year-old Nurul Nadirah Abdullah, better known by her nickname Dirang, was abducted before she was raped and murdered by her captor at an oil plantation in Bandar Seri Alam, Masai. The burnt remains of Dirang, who was three months away from her fifth birthday, was eventually found at the plantation a week after her disappearance. The crime and its brutality caused shock to the public at the time it happened.

The police investigated Dirang's case and managed to arrest five suspects, although only one of them, the same person who killed Dirang, was charged with her murder. The offender, a 24-year-old contract labourer named Muidin Maidin, was found guilty of murdering Dirang and sentenced to death by the Johor Bahru High Court in June 2013.

Between 2014 and 2024, Muidin appealed against the death sentence and conviction but they ultimately failed, and he is currently on death row awaiting his execution.

== Disappearance and murder ==
On 1 March 2012, at Bandar Seri Alam, Pasir Gudang in Malaysia's Johor Bahru, a four-year-old girl went missing after she left home to buy instant noodles and eggs from a nearby grocery shop.

Nurul Nadirah Abdullah, affectionately known as Dirang, lived in a block of flats nearby the grocery store, and she obediently agreed to help her family to go for a brief grocery run. However, Dirang, who had an older brother, did not return home after more than an hour, and her mother, out of concern, went to the grocery store to search for her daughter, but the shopkeeper informed her that she left the shop as soon as she finished buying the items. A police report was lodged soon after the child's disappearance. A massive search was conducted to look for Dirang, but she was nowhere to be found. The media also reported Dirang's case and publicized it in an effort to seek her whereabouts.

Police later recovered Dirang's slippers and her bag of groceries at an oil palm plantation located just behind the flats. It was also revealed by witnesses that Dirang was last seen together with a couple not far from the shop before she was gone. Dirang's mother, who was interviewed by a newspaper, said that she was reprimanded by people for letting her daughter go out alone without adult supervision, but she said that the area was normally safe as there were many children in the neighbourhood who often went out alone to play without their parents accompanying them, and she said she would not have left Dirang to go alone outdoors should the area itself was unsafe.

A week after Dirang's disappearance, on 8 March 2012, the charred remains of a young girl was discovered at a palm oil plantation in Bandar Seri Alam, and DNA tests subsequently confirmed that the corpse belonged to the missing Dirang. Through a post-mortem examination, Dirang, who was four years and nine months old at the time of her death, was confirmed to have been sexually assaulted by her attacker(s) before she was murdered. Dirang was eventually buried at Kampung Pertanian Masai Muslim Cemetery after a short funeral was conducted. Dirang's family, who were all heartbroken over the fate of Dirang, planned to move away to another place to leave the sad past behind.

== Investigations ==
The Royal Malaysia Police re-classified the disappearance case of Dirang as murder. The police, in response to the huge public outcry, described the murder of Dirang as a "cold-blooded murder" and promised that they would, to the fullest extent, sought the killer(s) responsible for this crime and bring them to justice.

After extensive investigations, a total of five suspects (one female and four males), including Dirang's 29-year-old biological father Handry Yangot, were arrested and investigated for their involvement in the murder. Two of the suspects were found to have previous convictions for drug offences, and three of them were remanded further until 30 March 2012. The police also uncovered that the rape-murder of Dirang was committed as a result of a feud with drug addicts, which also implicated Dirang's family. Roselyn Alan, Dirang's 25-year-old mother, stated that she wanted justice for her daughter, and the people responsible should go through the same suffering as her daughter had.

After some investigations, Johor state police chief Mohd Mokhtar Mohd Shariff confirmed to the public that Dirang's biological father was not involved in the murder, but however, given that he was a Filipino citizen and he had no legal documents to facilitate his stay in Malaysia, he was deemed to have illegally entered and settled in Malaysia and faced deportation to the Philippines. Dirang's mother, who was formerly married with Handry in 2005 at Sabah, stated that she was fearful of losing Dirang's birth father after her daughter. She stated that her ex-husband had no family in the Philippines and he already settled in Malaysia for a long time, and it would not be good for her son (Dirang's brother) should he be absent from her son's life.

Eventually, it was confirmed that one of the five suspects caught would be charged with murder. On 26 March 2012, 24-year-old Muidin Maidin (also spelt Muidin Mydin), a contract labourer, was charged with murder, which carried the mandatory death penalty under Malaysian law. Another one of the suspects was also charged, not for murder, but for drug consumption and he was sentenced to jail for one month not long after he was arrested.

== Trial of Muidin Maidin ==
Muidin Maidin
- Born: 1988 (age 37–38); Malaysia
- Status: Incarcerated on death row
- Conviction: Murder (one count)
- Penalty: Death

Details
- Victims: Nurul Nadirah Abdullah (deceased)
- Date: 1 March 2012
- Country: Malaysia
- State: Johor
- Date apprehended: 2 March 2012

On 25 February 2013, Muidin Maidin stood trial for the murder of Dirang at the Johor Bahru High Court. The prosecution was led by Umar Saifuddin Jaafar, Chua Shyne Chien and Jasmee Hameeza Jaafar, while the defence was led by Mohd Daud Ismail, Goh Tse Han and Mohamad Abd Kadir. A total of three witnesses for the defence and 35 prosecution witnesses were summoned to court to testify, and a total of 133 exhibits of evidence were displayed during the trial.

The trial court was told that Muidin had encountered Dirang on the date she went missing, while she was on the way back home from buying instant noodles and eggs. Muidin was said to have lured the girl with candy and thus abducted her. After abducting Dirang, Muidin brought her to an oil palm plantation in Bandar Seri Alam, Masai, where he raped the girl before he smothered her, causing four-year-old Dirang to suffocate and died as a result. After this, in order to destroy the evidence, Muidin set fire to her body and burnt it before he left the charred remains at the plantation, where it would eventually be found by the girl's grandfather. Also, the reason why Muidin committed the crime was due to him feeling enraged at the fact that he was allegedly insulted and looked down upon by the victim's grandmother, and he thus killed Dirang out of his vengeful desire.

Dr Noor Azma Sohari, a dental forensic expert of Hospital Universiti Kebangsaan Malaysia (HUKM), also testified in court that after comparing the photo of Dirang and examining the teeth of the deceased, she certified that the deceased was indeed Dirang, and the age of the deceased's teeth was four years and eight months, nearly consistent with Dirang's actual age.

DNA evidence also confirmed that the semen found on Dirang's vagina and anus belonged to Muidin, and the soil caked on Muidin's motorcycle matched to the soil nearby Dirang's corpse in the plantation. Charred remains of a sarong was also found at the scene, and the sarong itself belonged to Muidin, who owned only one such sarong. In spite of the forensic evidence, Muidin denied in his defence that he was involved in the murder of Dirang and denied that he targeted Dirang out of resentment towards her or her family, and said he was innocent. Muidin also claimed he had an alibi and he was at a friend's house on 1 March 2012, but the witness for Muidin's alibi defence testified that he last saw Muidin on 29 February 2012, the eve of Dirang's murder. Another prosecution witness also testified that he saw Muidin coming out of the plantation on 1 March, the same day when Dirang was murdered.

On 28 June 2013, after a trial that dragged on for four months, Justice Datuk Abdul Halim Aman delivered his verdict. In his judgement, the judge condemned Muidin as a cold-blooded killer and the cruelest of all murderers, stating that he gave in to his "animalistic lust" and sexually assaulted Dirang before he suffocated her to death, and his conduct overall was "cruel and heartless", and the DNA tests also linked Muidin to the semen traces found on the girl's private parts, plus the traces of Dirang's clothes at the scene. Justice Abdul Halim additionally summed up that the irresponsibility of Dirang's parents and public apathy were among the primary causes of Dirang's murder, as the defenceless and young Dirang had been left alone to procure groceries and based on the layout of the kampung, it would not have been possible for any of the neighbours to not hear or see anything bad happening to the girl, and these factors had directed the turn of events to this stage, and it turned into a nationwide tragedy where many Malaysians expressed regret or sadness for the girl's plight.

Aside from being critical of the public apathy that indirectly led to the murder, Justice Abdul Halim did not detract from determining Muidin's guilt for the "painful death" suffered by Dirang, stating that the forensic evidence had sufficiently nailed Muidin as the killer and the prosecution had proven beyond a reasonable doubt. Having noted the heinous nature of the crime, Justice Abdul Halim commented that aside from the mandatory death sentence, there was no other suitable punishment he was bound to impose under the law. As a result, 25-year-old Muidin Maidin was found guilty of murder and sentenced to death by hanging.

In response to the verdict of death, Dirang's mother, who was present in court with ten family members (including Dirang's brother, grandfather and stepfather), stated that the death sentence was "befitting" for Muidin over the murder of her daughter and was glad that justice was served. Dirang's grandfather also stated that he would leave it to Allah to punish Muidin for murdering his granddaughter. The prosecutor Umar Saifuddin told reporters at the end of the trial that forensic evidence played an important role in the successful prosecution and eventual conviction of Muidin, and credited the forensic experts for their efforts in bringing Muidin to justice.

== Appeal process ==
On 15 December 2014, the Court of Appeal rejected the appeal of Muidin against the trial verdict.

On 28 May 2015, the Federal Court of Malaysia, the apex court of the nation, dismissed Muidin's appeal and upheld his conviction for Dirang's murder, and finalized his death sentence.

== 2024 re-sentencing motion ==
Three years after Muidin lost his appeal to the Federal Court, while he was still incarcerated on death row, the Malaysian government announced in October 2018 that they would abolish the death penalty, although they later revised their stance and finalized their plan to make the death penalty discretionary and it would no longer be mandatory for all offences. The mandatory death penalty was eventually repealed in April 2023, and under the revised laws, anyone convicted of murder would face either the death sentence or a lengthy jail term ranging between 30 and 40 years, and after the new laws took effect in July 2023, 936 out of more than 1,000 death row prisoners in Malaysia filed applications to the Federal Court of Malaysia to be re-sentenced.

Muidin was one of the 936 death row prisoners to appeal for a reduction of their death sentences, and the appeal was heard on 9 July 2024 by the Federal Court. Muidin's lawyer Nik Mohamed Ikhwan Nik Mahamud highlighted that Muidin was now a changed man and was truly remorseful for having killed Dirang 12 years before, and participated in many religious and motivational activities inside prison. Nik Mohamed Ikhwan pleaded on these grounds that justice should be tempered with mercy in his client's case, and he hence asked for Muidin to serve the maximum jail term of 40 years for the murder of Dirang. In rebuttal, Deputy Public Prosecutor (DPP) Mohd Amril Johari urged the court to maintain the death penalty, stating that it was a tragic case of a girl being abducted while on the way back home from a grocery run, and Muidin had callously raped and murdered her before burning her body to destroy the evidence, and this shocked the public so much that it remained widely discussed even after a year since it happened. DPP Mohd Amril also added that even if Muidin had truly repented for his actions, it would not be able to make up for the cruel acts he committed on Dirang back in 2012.

After mulling over the submissions, Chief Justice Tun Tengku Maimun Tuan Mat and the other two judges - Court of Appeal President Tan Sri Abang Iskandar Abang Hashim and Federal Court judge Datuk Nordin Hassan - decided to accept the prosecution's objection and rejected Muidin's re-sentencing appeal, and condemned 36-year-old Muidin Maidin to hang for the murder of Dirang.

Muidin was one of the three convicted murderers to lost their re-sentencing motions at the Federal Court on 9 July 2024. The other two killers were Kher Tian Hock, who killed a teenager and buried her in concrete in 2004; and Rabidin Satir, who was found guilty of killing a schoolgirl and a civil servant between 2009 and 2012.

== Current status ==
As of 2024, Muidin Maidin remains on death row awaiting his execution, which had not been scheduled.

== Aftermath ==
The murder of Dirang remained as one of Malaysia's most shocking child murders to happen during the 2010s. It was also one of the highly reported missing children cases that affected the public at the time it happened. When it first came to light, the Malaysian public became concerned about the greater need to maintain the safety of children, especially those who were left to their own devices and went out alone without their parents' supervision. Deputy Prime Minister Tan Sri Muhyiddin Yassin expressed his condemnation over the crime and offered condolences to Dirang's family, who received financial aid from Muhyiddin through an information officer. Mohamad Borhan Awang and his wife Nora Abu Bakar, whose 15-year-old daughter Syafiqah Mohamad Borhan fell victim to a rape-murder in 2006 at Bandar Baru UDA, expressed sympathy for Dirang's family and the plight of Dirang's bereaved kin brought back their painful memories of losing Syafiqah.

In 2019, in light of the brutal rape-murder of 11-year-old Siti Masitah Ibrahim, Malaysian lawyer Muhammad Hafiz Hood spoke up on the topic of violent crimes on children. Muhammad Hafiz stated that in most cases, the offenders who committed crimes against children - like rape, assault or murder - were often the people known to the victims, like friends or family members. Muhammad Hafiz stated that notably, the case of Dirang's abduction, rape and murder was committed by Muidin Maidin, who knew the family and sought revenge over a personal grudge and thus killed Dirang. Muhammad Hafiz, who had taken up both civil litigation and criminal cases (including juvenile cases) for the past six years, stated that not only should the law emphasize on the need for deterrence and retribution on such crimes, the community should not be apathetic to such crimes should their warning signs surfaced and to prevent vulnerable children from falling victim to brutal crimes.

Similarly, in 2023, Raja Zarith Sofiah, then Permaisuri of Johor, called upon the authorities to step up and boost the child protection system, citing the cases of Dirang and Nurul Huda Abdul Ghani (who was raped and killed in 2004) to highlight the need to deter violent crimes against children and introduce harsher laws to curb the phenomenon from arising again.

== See also ==
- Capital punishment in Malaysia
- List of solved missing person cases (post-2000)
