= Rambo Bentong murders =

Malaysian convicted serial killer and rapist

Rabidin Satir
- Born: 1970 (age 55–56); Kampung Libang Ulu, Tambunan, Sabah, Malaysia
- Other name: Rambo Bentong
- Status: Incarcerated on death row
- Convictions: Murder (two counts); Robbery; Firearm offence Multiple counts of rape and sexual assault
- Criminal charges: Murder (2 counts); Robbery; Firearm offence Rape (4 counts); Sexual assault Attempted murder
- Penalty: Death(×2) (murders); 50 years' imprisonment and 36 strokes of the cane

Details
- Victims: 2-5
- Span of crimes: 2009–2012
- Country: Malaysia
- State: Pahang

Between 2009 and 2012, Rabidin Satir, nicknamed "Rambo Bentong", was suspected of committing several murders in Bentong, Pahang, Malaysia, although only two victims were ever confirmed. On 8 March 2009, Rabidin broke into the home of a 17-year-old schoolgirl, Annie Kok Yin Cheng (郭婉晶 Guō Wǎnjīng), raping her before he slit her throat, killing her instantly. Three years later, on 3 November 2012, Rabidin battered a 31-year-old forestry department employee, Khairul Hazri Jamaludin, to death with his homemade rifle.

Rabidin, who committed several rapes and property offences during his three-year crime spree in Bentong, was arrested 11 days after murdering Khairul and subsequently charged for the crimes he committed. Between 2013 and 2015, Rabidin was found guilty of killing both Kok and Khairul and sentenced to death, and had also received multiple jail terms with caning for other offences he committed prior to his arrest. Between 2016 and 2024, Rabidin lost his appeals against the death penalty for both of his two murder convictions, and has been on death row since 2024.

== Personal life ==
Rabidin Satir, a Malaysian of Dusun Muslim descent, originated from Kampung Libang Ulu in the highland interior district of Tambunan (a remote developing village right next to the district of Ranau), which is located in Sabah, East Malaysia. His family made a living by farming and they were affluent and well-respected in their hometown. His brother was a well-respected imam in the kampung.

In 2007, Rabidin later moved to West Malaysia and he settled in the forested areas of Bentong, a town in Pahang. It was there in Bentong, between 2009 and 2012, Rabidin would turn to a life of crime and brought about a reign of terror in the quiet town of Bentong throughout these three years.

== Murder of Annie Kok Yin Cheng ==
Annie Kok Yin Cheng, the first murder victim of the Rambo Bentong case

On the early morning of 8 March 2009, at Kampung Ketari in Bentong, a teenage girl was found murdered in her home due to a possible robbery-murder bid.

17-year-old Annie Kok Yin Cheng (6 June 1991 – 8 March 2009), whose stepfather Sew Kok Wee (徐国辉 Xú Guóhuī) was the kampung headman, was last seen the night before at her home using her computer. Kok's sister showed up on the following day, stumbling upon the body of her younger sister, who had a gaping knife wound on her neck and whose body was covered in a blanket. Kok was later found to have been raped after a post-mortem examination was conducted on her body; her clothes were also being partially removed, which showed that she was likely being sexually assaulted. According to her stepfather, his stepdaughter was a quiet girl who often stayed at home using the computer and liked watching television, and her mother, who was formerly married to Kok's real father before her divorce and second marriage, also told police that her daughter's wallet was missing. An update in August 2009 revealed that an unknown male's DNA was discovered on Kok's private parts.

The police also found that at least six lighting devices were dismantled in Kok's house, which made them theorizing that the killer was someone known to the deceased, and possibly a premeditated crime. Following the revelation of Kok's murder, many residents of her kampung in Bentong hyped up security measures by using stronger metal gates and railings to protect themselves from possible intruders. Kok left behind her birth mother, stepfather, a birth sister, two half-brothers and one half-sister fathered by her stepfather, and her step-grandfather.

For the following three years, the death of Kok remained unsolved, and there were rampant rumours accusing Kok's stepfather as the true killer of the case, even though there were evidence proving that Kok's stepfather and his friend were both at Kuala Lumpur and outside Bentong when his stepdaughter was killed, and Kok's mother also believed in her husband's innocence and brushed off the rumours, which only dissipated after the arrest of Rabidin three years later in 2012. Official sources confirmed that Rabidin's DNA matched to the semen traces found on Kok's body, and he had committed the crime by intruding Kok's home and attacked her in her sleep, resulting in Kok's rape and murder.

== Murder of Khairul Hazri Jamaludin ==
On 3 November 2012, a couple was attacked at the quarters of Bentong Forestry Department, with the husband, who worked at the department, being killed while the wife was raped but survived the brutal attack.

31-year-old Khairul Hazri bin Jamaludin (1981 – 3 November 2012) and his 28-year-old pregnant wife Yuslailee binti Mat, with whom he was married for three years, were sleeping at the quarters of the forestry department when Rabidin had intruded the place with a home-made shotgun and robbed the couple at gunpoint. Rabidin also wielded his rifle at Khairul, who tried to defend himself and his wife. Khairul was overpowered by Rabidin, who repeatedly used the butt of his gun to severely bludgeon Khairul on the head several times until he became semi-unconscious. Afterwards, Rabidin went after Khairul's wife, assaulting her and despite her plea that she was pregnant, Rabidin ruthlessly ignored her cries for mercy and raped her twice in front of her husband. After stealing some jewellery, Rabidin left the area, leaving the injured couple behind. Although Khairul's wife survived her injuries, her husband, who was mortally wounded from the assault, died on the way to a hospital.

An autopsy revealed that Khairul had suffered a fractured skull and other injuries that were the cause of his death. Khairul, the youngest of eight children in his family, had only begun working at the forestry department for 18 months before he was killed, and his family, who were devastated to hear his death, called for justice to be served and urged the police to solve the case.

== Other offences ==
=== Suspected murders ===
Official sources and media sources revealed that apart from Annie Kok Yin Cheng and Khairul Hazri Jamaludin, Rabidin Satir had allegedly killed another three people, all of whom were killed in Bentong.

On 3 May 2011, two years after Rabidin killed Kok, a double murder happened at a Malay kampung in Bentong, where an elderly couple in their 70s was found murdered at a double-storey wooden hut. It was suspected that Rabidin, for unspecified motives, had targeted the couple in his killing spree and the police managed to link him to the double murder through investigations.

On 29 May 2012, about five to six months before Rabidin murdered Khairul, a 63-year-old man was robbed at gunpoint at Kampung Kemansur in Bentong, before the man himself, a married father of two, was shot dead by the culprit, who was believed to be Rabidin based on the police investigations that similarly connected him to the fatal shooting, which was Bentong's first case of murder involving firearms to date. By then, the crimes committed by Rabidin, particularly the murders he committed, had shocked the whole of Bentong, with its residents finally realizing that a possible serial killer was roaming free in their quiet and peaceful town.

In October 2013, a year after Rabidin was arrested, Sin Chew Daily revealed that based on police investigations, there was a possible sixth victim, identified as a nine-year-old girl who was allegedly raped and murdered by Rabidin on an unknown date or location in Bentong, although it was widely believed in the end that Rabidin had killed a total of five people.

=== Other various offences ===
Aside from the murders he committed in Bentong, Rabidin had also committed at least eight more crimes in the same region, ranging from sexual offences to property offences. Nearly all of Rabidin's offences, including the murders, were committed in various kampungs of Bentong, specifically those located near the forests. Except for the killings, all of Rabidin's crimes (if not most) were listed as below:

On 9 July 2009, between 2am and 3am, Rabidin raped a nine-year-old girl in Taman Sri Marong, Bentong.

Between 1am and 3am on 20 June 2010, Rabidin raped a 17-year-old girl in a house in Jalan Kuala Lumpur-Bentong.

On 28 April 2011, between 12.30am and 1.30am on that morning, Rabidin raped an eight-year-old girl at a riverside behind a house in Ketari, Bentong, four days before Rabidin committed a double murder at a Malay kampung in Bentong.

On 12 October 2011, Rabidin attacked a 16-year-old girl in a house in Ketari, Bentong between 1am and 2.30am, and he raped and sodomized the teenager.

On 12 December 2011, Rabidin intruded a durian plantation in Bentong and fired multiple shots at a family of seven who were keeping watch at the plantation. Luckily, none of the seven were hurt during the shooting.

On Christmas Day of 2011 (25 December 2011), at a goat farm in Karak, Bentong, Rabidin had committed an offence of attempted murder by shooting at an Indonesian goat farm worker, who survived the shooting.

On 10 January 2012, Rabidin intruded a rubber plantation in Bentong and attacked an elderly female plantation worker, who was raped by Rabidin.

On the night of 7 June 2012, nine days after he murdered a Kampung Kemansur resident by shooting, Rabidin brandished a gun and robbed a 70-year-old Chinese woman, who was a local resident of Bentong, and had attempted to rape and strangle the old woman before he escaped from the victim's house, and the victim survived her ordeal. This was the last crime Rabidin would commit before he murdered Khairul Hazri Jamaludin nearly four months later.

== Arrest ==
After the murder of Khairul Hazri Jamaludin, the public, full of shock over the brutality of the offence and some other previous severe crimes that happened in Bentong, urged the police to quickly investigate and close these cases. The police also promised the public that they would, to the fullest extent, investigate and solve all these cases to ensure that the killer was brought to justice and conducted a manhunt for the perpetrator. Eventually, 11 days after he committed his fifth murder, Rabidin Satir was finally identified by police as a prime suspect and arrested on 14 November 2012. During the course of his arrest, Rabidin attempted to resist arrest by attacking a police constable named Mohd Suhaimi Md Razali at Taman Shahbandar Husin, Bentong and caused grievous hurt to him with a parang, and attempted to kill the police officer to no avail.

During the course of police investigations, the authorities managed to discover that Rabidin was responsible for the 2009 unsolved rape-murder of Annie Kok Yin Cheng, and linked him to both the Bentong Malay kampung double murder and Kampung Kemansur murder case, as well as linking him to some other cases of robbery and sexual assaults. On 13 December 2012, a month after his arrest, Rabidin was officially charged with the murder of Annie Kok Yin Cheng and the rape of four other minors aged between eight and 17, and one count of unnatural sex with one of the four minors he raped. A charge of rape carried the maximum sentence of 30 years' imprisonment with possible caning while an offence of murder carried the mandatory death penalty in the Malaysian Penal Code. On the same day he was charged, Rabidin pleaded guilty to raping the nine-year-old girl but denied murdering Kok, although his plea of guilt was turned down by the magistrate.

On 18 January 2013, when Rabidin appeared in court once again to undergo preliminary hearings for the existing charges and other crimes he was yet to be charged for, the families of his deceased victims, including Annie Kok's stepfather and mother, the Malay couple's two daughters, nephew and relatives, and the Kampung Kemansur resident's brother-in-law, all appeared in court to catch the first glimpse of the Bentong serial killer, who had been escorted by ten heavily armed policemen for the safety of the members of the public present in the courtroom.

Although he allegedly murdered five people throughout the past three years before his arrest and had faced charges for all the crimes he committed in Bentong, Rabidin was only tried for killing both Annie Kok and Khairul, who were his confirmed victims of murder in his crime spree, which brought shock and horror to the whole of Malaysia. For his multiple crimes in Bentong, especially rape and murder, as well as his tendency to live in the forested areas of Bentong, Rabidin was notoriously dubbed as "Rambo Bentong" by the media and widely regarded as the most dangerous serial killer and rapist whom Malaysia had encountered back then.

== Trial proceedings ==
=== Trial for lesser offences ===
On 5 February 2013, after standing trial at a Sessions Court in Pahang, Rabidin Satir pleaded guilty to four counts of rape and one of committing unnatural sex on four victims aged between nine and 17. Justice Murtazadi Amran sentenced him to 25 years' jail and ten strokes of the cane on each rape charge and 15 years' jail and ten strokes for committing unnatural sex, and ordered all five jail terms to run consecutively from the date of Rabidin's arrest, making it a total of 115 years' imprisonment and 50 strokes of the cane. The following month, on 21 March 2013, Rabidin was sentenced to 18 years' imprisonment for the attempted murder of police constable Mohd Suhaimi Md Razali, and it ran consecutively with the 115-year jail term Rabidin gotten for the rape charges he was convicted for, which totalled up to 133 years' imprisonment.

On 29 November 2013, Rabidin successfully appealed to reduce his 115-year jail term (for sexual offences) to 40 years' imprisonment, and his caning was reduced from 50 strokes to 24 strokes instead. Similarly, Rabidin's second jail term of 18 years (for attempted murder) was lowered to ten years' jail. In total, Rabidin's prison sentence was revised to 50 years, in addition to 24 strokes of the cane.

=== Annie Kok murder trial ===
On 30 July 2013, Rabidin, who was then serving his jail term for the previous rape charges, stood trial at the Temerloh High Court for the 2009 rape-murder of Annie Kok Yin Cheng. The prosecution charged that Rabidin was responsible for killing Kok after he intruded her home with an intent to commit robbery, and had encountered Kok, whom he attacked and raped before he finally slit her throat and caused her death.

On 31 March 2014, Rabidin was called to enter his defence after the trial court ruled that the prosecution successfully established a prima facie case against the accused. Rabidin, who had undergone caning in prison while on trial, was reportedly in a poor physical condition and had difficulty moving after having all 24 strokes of the cane administered on him, which led to the trial being delayed at least twice, given that he appeared to be unfit to put up his defence and refused to reply during cross-examination, despite the medical professionals' assessment that he was fit to enter his defence. Reportedly, Rabidin denied that he murdered Kok and also denied that he knew the victim. He told the court that he was out drinking at a coffeeshop after some night fishing and he was so drunk that he fell asleep on the streets until the next day when a female passer-by woke him up. He was the sole witness in his defence, and he repeatedly answered that he "did not remember" during cross-examination.

On 6 August 2014, Justice Datuk Abdul Karim Ab Rahman delivered his verdict. He found that based on the forensic evidence presented, it was clear from the onset that Rabidin had murdered Kok and he did not accept Rabidin's defence, stating that Rabidin relied on bare denials and did not do much to rebut the prosecution's case, and there was sufficient weight in the prosecution's case to determine Rabidin's guilt for the murder of 17-year-old Annie Kok. Hence, Rabidin was found guilty of murder and sentenced to death by hanging. On the other hand, Justice Abdul Karim acquitted Rabidin of the other charge of rape, stating that after his review of the forensic evidence, it was unclear whether or not Kok had been raped by Rabidin while she was still alive.

Kok's family reportedly welcomed the verdict of death for Rabidin, stating that they hoped for justice to be served and wished that Kok could rest in peace with the news of her murderer being convicted. Kok's stepfather also told the press that the conviction of Rabidin for his stepdaughter's death made him glad, as it proved that he was innocent and dispelled the rumours that he was the true killer of his stepdaughter.

=== Khairul Hazri Jamaludin murder trial ===
After he was sentenced to hang for murdering Kok, Rabidin was put on trial at the Kuantan High Court for murder a second time on a charge of battering Khairul Hazri Jamaludin to death with his rifle. He also faced another four charges for having raped Khairul's wife and robbed the couple at gunpoint, all of which he originally pleaded guilty to before he retracted his plea of guilt prior to claiming trial for Khairul's murder. Rabidin reportedly also denied that he killed Khairul, raped Khairul's wife or even robbed the couple, claiming that he was not at the scene of crime and he never knew the couple at all, even though Khairul's wife had testified in the trial and forensic evidence to prove that Rabidin had been present at the murder scene.

On 3 December 2015, Justice Datuk Seri Mariana Yahya delivered her verdict. She rejected Rabidin's claim that he had not been present at the scene, stating that there was irrefutable forensic evidence which showed that Rabidin's DNA on the semen located on the blouse of Khairul's wife and bedsheet, and the DNA extracted from the gloves recovered at the scene. Justice Mariana concluded that the defence had failed to raise a reasonable doubt on the prosecution's case, and hence he should be convicted as charged. The judge also took to mention that the case itself involved the taking of a life, and it also pertained to the safety of women from sexual violence, which required the law's fullest force of deterrence to prevent such a phenomenon from happening again.

Hence, Rabidin was found guilty of murder and therefore sentenced to death a second time. Aside from capital punishment for Khairul's murder, Justice Mariana also handed down a 12-year jail term and eight strokes of the cane for the two counts of raping Khairul's pregnant wife, another 12 years' jail with two strokes of the cane under the Firearms Act for brandishing a gun at Khairul, and a third sentence of eight years' jail and two strokes of the cane for robbery.

These multiple jail terms were to be served concurrently with the 50-year sentence which Rabidin received before his two murder trials, meaning that Rabidin still had to serve a prison sentence of 50 years but would be given a total of 36 strokes of the cane (including the 12 cane strokes he received for the robbery and rape charges).

== Appeal processes ==
=== Annie Kok murder appeal ===
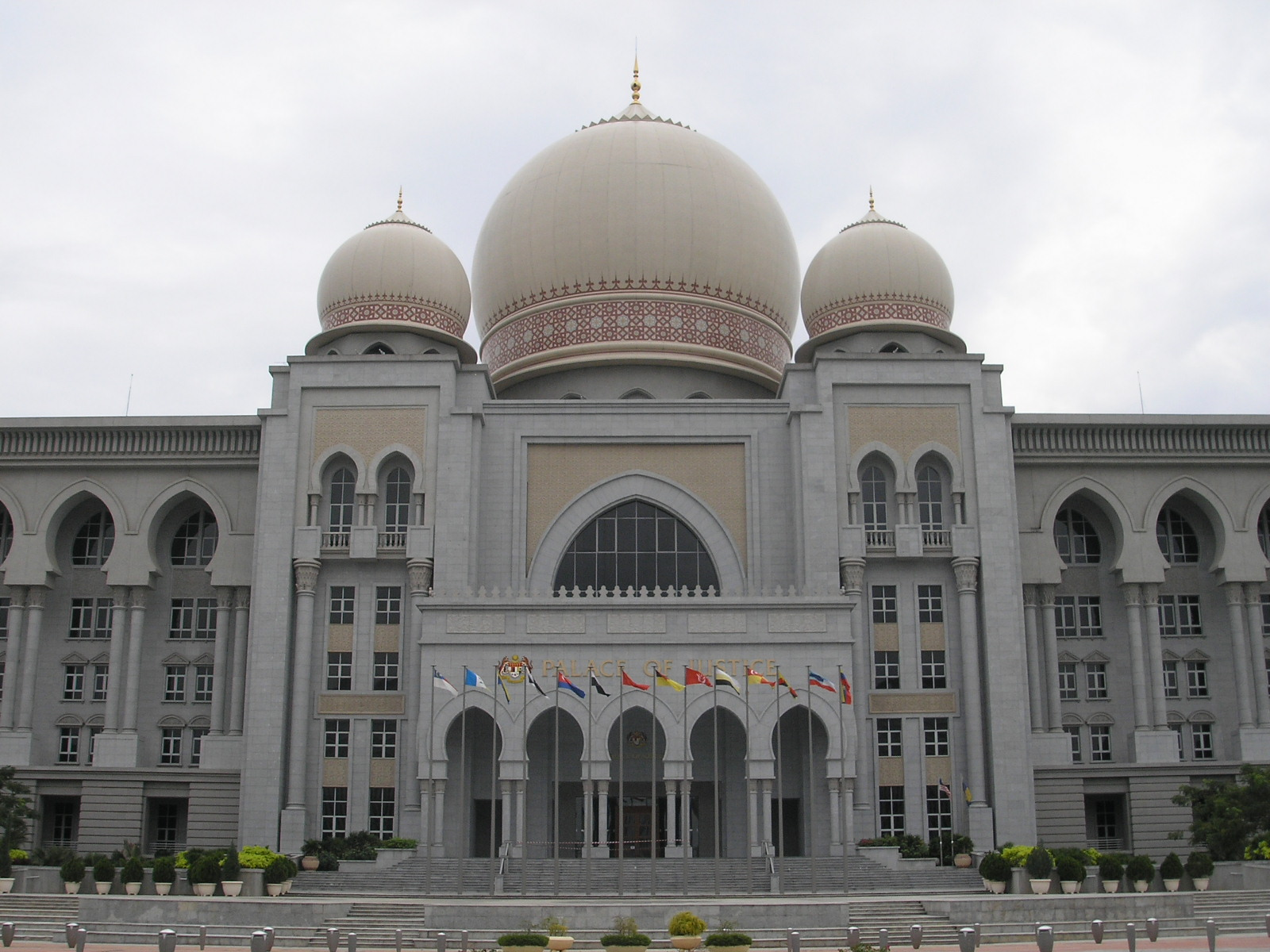
The Federal Court of Malaysia, the country's highest court, where Rabidin appealed his death sentences

On 8 October 2015, Rabidin appealed the trial court's decision to convict him of the murder of Annie Kok, but the Court of Appeal dismissed Rabidin's appeal against the trial court's ruling, as the three-judge panel - consisting of Justice Datuk Aziah Ali, Justice Datuk Rohana Yusof and Justice Datuk Dr Prasad Sandosham Abraham - determined that there were sufficient grounds to convict Rabidin of murder and that his conviction was therefore safe. The prosecution did not appeal against Rabidin's acquittal for the rape of Kok before her death.

On 21 October 2016, the Federal Court of Malaysia, also the apex court of the nation, rejected the appeal of Rabidin and confirmed the death penalty for Rabidin's conviction of murdering Kok. The five-judge panel - consisting of Chief Justice Zulkefli Ahmad Makinudin, Justice Suriyadi Halim Omar, Justice Hasan Lah, Justice Zainun Ali and Justice Zaharah Ibrahim - stated that the DNA testing results and forensics evidence adduced by the prosecution had proven beyond a reasonable doubt that Rabidin was indeed responsible for killing Kok.

=== Khairul murder appeal ===
On 15 March 2017, the Court of Appeal's three judges - Mohtarudin Baki, Zakaria Sam and Abang Iskandar Abang Hashim - rejected Rabidin's appeal against his second conviction of murdering Khairul Hazri Jamaludin, as well as his other convictions of raping Khairul's wife and robbing the couple at gunpoint. The three judges pronounced in their ruling that there was no merit in the appeal filed by Rabidin in this case, and hence, they decided to dismiss his appeal.

On 16 August 2018, the Federal Court turned down Rabidin's appeal and upheld his conviction and death sentence for Khairul's murder, as well as affirming his other convictions in this case. The Federal Court's five judges - Chief Justice Tan Sri Richard Malanjum, Sabah and Sarawak Chief Justice Datuk David Wong Dak Wah and three Federal Court judges Tan Sri Hasan Lah, Tan Sri Azahar Mohamed and Datuk Mohd Zawawi Salleh - unanimously dismissed the appeal on the grounds that there was plenty of evidence that incriminated Rabidin and proved his involvement in the crime.

== Subsequent legal developments ==
=== Repeal of mandatory death penalty ===
In October 2018, two months after Rabidin Satir lost his final appeal, the Malaysian government announced that the death penalty would be fully abolished in the country, where more than 1,100 people, including Rabidin, were held on death row for various capital crimes. The announcement sparked a huge public outcry from most Malaysians, given that the country was highly supportive of capital punishment. Specifically, for the families whose loved ones were murdered, they were disappointed in the government's decision, stating that justice would not be served if the killers who took innocent lives in cold blood were allowed to escape the gallows. Notably, Tan Siew Ling (陈㛢婈 Chén Xiùlíng), the mother of Annie Kok Yin Cheng, who had been the first of Rabidin's five deceased victims, was among the most vocal of these family members, objecting to the government's plans to remove the death penalty.

Kok's mother, the mother of murdered cosplayer Ng Yuk Tim (whose boyfriend Poon Wai Hong was jailed 22 years for her manslaughter) and countless other families of murder victims in Malaysia gathered in November 2018 to express their opposition to the abolition of capital punishment, and they also slammed the human rights advocates for wanting to protect the rights of the killers on death row while neglecting the human rights of the victims. In another news update in January 2020, Kok's mother and the relatives of seven other murder victims - Anthony Kevin Morais, Sosilawati Lawiya, Stephen Wong Jing Kui, Chee Gaik Yap, Datuk Mohd Mazlan Idris, Muhammad Hafiz Idris and Nurulhanim Idris - gathered together to petition to the government to not abolish the death penalty, stating that the abolition might lead to killers escaping well-deserved justice for their crimes. The rape and murder of Annie Kok remained as one of Malaysia's worst homicides in the public eye to date, and it became one of the cases mentioned in the public debate of whether to repeal the death penalty in Malaysia.

Subsequently, the government decided to keep the death penalty but it would no longer be mandatory for all offences, including murder. In April 2023, Kok's mother appeared outside the Parliament building, protesting against the abolition of mandatory capital punishment. Kok's mother highlighted the gruesome and brutal circumstances as to how her daughter died and how Rabidin sexually assaulted her daughter before he killed her, and she also cited that Rabidin had not only killed one but five innocent people and he should not be, in any way, spared the gallows for the heinous offences he committed back in 2009 to 2012. A civil group also supported Kok's mother in her plea and provided their research results, which showed that many other members of the public, especially those whose loved ones died due to murder, opposed the repeal of mandatory death sentences. Despite the impassioned plea by Kok's mother and other calls against it, the Malaysian government approved the abolition of both the mandatory death penalty and natural life imprisonment, and revised new laws to allow those convicted of murder to face either the death penalty or a jail term of 30 to 40 years.

=== Re-sentencing bid in 2024 ===
After the new laws took effect in July 2023, the government allowed all death row inmates in Malaysia to appeal for a reduction of their sentences, enabling some convicted killers like Teh Kim Hong (who was found guilty of the 2008 kidnap-cum-killing of Lai Ying Xin in Kulai) to receive jail terms of 30 to 40 years instead of death, and in November 2023, the first batch of 11 prisoners, seven on death row and four who received natural life jail terms, had their sentences reduced to 30 years' imprisonment each by the Federal Court of Malaysia. Rabidin had applied for re-sentencing to the Federal Court, which received a total of 936 re-sentencing applications from those on Malaysia's death row (only a minority of them did not appeal).

On 9 July 2024, a three-judge bench led by Chief Justice Tengku Maimun Tuan Mat heard Rabidin's appeal at the Federal Court. During the hearing, the prosecution, led by Deputy Public Prosecutor (DPP) Yusaini Amer Abdul Karim, opposed to the commutation of Rabidin's death sentences, stating that the offender had committed two "brutal" and "inhumane" murders and it fitted the description of the "rarest of rare" cases that deserved the death penalty. In response, the defence lawyer Fairuz Ahmad Yusof submitted that Rabidin was apologetic towards both his victims in these two cases and he insisted there was no intention for him to commit any of the offences in question. The defence pointed out there was no witness who directly saw Rabidin murdering Kok and Rabidin himself only wanted to steal guns when he entered the forestry department quarters and encountered the sleeping Khairul and his wife. In response to this submission, the Chief Justice questioned the defence by stating that the victims were killed in their homes, which put the safety of their homes in question. It was revealed that during his time on death row, Rabidin gradually became unable to walk and he suffered from high blood pressure, and his lawyer tried to make use of Rabidin's health issue as a mitigating factor.

After hearing the submissions, the Federal Court rejected Rabidin's appeal to commute both his death sentences for murdering Annie Kok and Khairul Hazri Jamaludin back in 2009 and 2012 respectively. On that same day when Rabidin failed his appeal, two other convicted murderers – Kher Tian Hock (who killed See Sheau Fang and buried her in concrete) and Muidin Maidin (who murdered a five-year-old girl nicknamed "Dirang") – also lost their final appeals to overturn the death penalty.

In response to the verdict, Kok's mother was satisfied that her daughter's killer would be hanged for his crimes. Kok's mother said that she was fearful for a period of time that Rabidin would escape the gallows and feared that he might come out of prison one day to not only commit more crimes but also go after her family and herself, and she also heard from a police officer that Rabidin spent his time on death row reading the Quran and was a well-behaved inmate behind bars. The outcome of Rabidin's failed appeal brought much relief and closure to Kok's family. Kok's mother added that she hoped that Rabidin's death sentence could be carried out soon in order to put an end to this painful chapter, and additionally hoped for the other families of murder victims to not give up in their pursuit for justice. Kok's mother also said that her quest for justice and her opposition to the abolition of capital punishment was what she could do for her daughter after her death, and added that her daughter would be happily married with children if she was still alive. It was updated that Kok's mother and stepfather continued to live in Bentong with Kok's elder sister, who was married with a child. Even the residents of Bentong also supported the Federal Court's decision to sentence Rabidin to death, as they sympathized with his victims and despised the harm he caused to countless families back then.

== Current status ==
As of 2024, Rabidin Satir was on death row for murdering both Khairul Hazri Jamaludin and Annie Kok Yin Cheng.

== See also ==
- Capital punishment in Malaysia
