= Killing of Ng Yuk Tim =

2013 killing of a teenage girl in Malaysia

Ng Yuk Tim
- A photo of Ng Yuk Tim, taken on her birthday before her death
- Born: Ng Yuk Tim; 7 October 1998; Malaysia
- Died: 21 October 2013 (aged 15); Kampung Cempaka, Kelana Jaya, Selangor, Malaysia
- Cause of death: Fatal head injury
- Other name: Tim Tim
- Occupation: Student
- Known for: Murder victim
- Parents: Ng Sai Kuan (father); Sim Yee Ling (mother)
- Family: Sim Bek Boon (grandfather); Yap Pik Wan (grandmother); One younger sister Sim Yee Lien (aunt)

On 21 October 2013, in Selangor, Malaysia, 15-year-old Ng Yuk Tim (吴易甜 Wú Yìtián), a cosplay enthusiast, went missing after she last departed her home to meet a male friend for planning an upcoming cosplay event. Although the male acquaintance, Poon Wai Hong (潘伟雄 Pān Wěixióng), told the police that he last dropped Ng off at a nearby LRT station after they met each other in his house, the police still considered him as a suspect and he eventually confessed that he killed Ng inside his house at Kampung Cempaka, Kelana Jaya, and stuffed her body inside a suitcase before abandoning it in Kota Kemuning, Shah Alam.

Dubbed the "cosplay killer", Poon claimed in his defence during his murder trial that he intended to have sex with Ng, but she refused and hence it led to a fight that caused Ng to die from being hit by a dumbbell, which Poon insisted was unintentional. Originally convicted of murder and sentenced to death by the Shah Alam High Court in 2018, Poon successfully appealed in 2019 to set aside his death sentence and reduce his murder charge to manslaughter, and he was in the end given 22 years' jail for the lesser charge.

== Murder investigation ==
On 21 October 2013, 15-year-old schoolgirl Ng Yuk Tim went missing after she last departed her home to meet a male friend about the planning of a cosplay event.

Ng's family reported her missing, and they also set up appeals publicly to seek her whereabouts. They also managed to find the male friend whose house Ng was supposed to head to. The male acquaintance, a 23-year-old building caretaker named Poon Wai Hong, told Ng's family that he indeed met Ng at his house in Kampung Cempaka, Kelana Jaya, but after they finished with the cosplay event discussion, Poon helped to drive Ng to a nearby LRT station and she alone alighted his car. Poon told the missing girl's family that it was the last time he saw Ng.

Malaysian Community Policing Association president Kuan Chee Heng, a former police officer and current civilian crime buster, later grew suspicious despite Poon's account of how he last seen Ng. Kuan later took Poon aside and questioned him, asking him to come clean with the case, and the police also suspected Poon after noticing a bite mark on his arm. Poon eventually made a shocking admission that Ng was actually dead and he dumped her body at a secluded area after putting her body inside a suitcase. The police were led to a place in Kota Kemuning, Shah Alam, where a suitcase containing the body of 15-year-old Ng Yuk Tim, confirming that Ng had indeed died and the bite mark matched to her teeth. An autopsy report showed that Ng sustained head injuries caused by at least three blows to the head and there were no indications that she was raped. A police probe was expected to be finished by 29 October before further action.

Reportedly, Ng's family was saddened and enraged when the truth came to light. Ng's maternal grandfather Sim Bek Boon (alias William Sim) stated that he would not forgive Poon for taking away their happiness and called him a "devil in disguise". At the time she died, Ng's parents had divorced in 2009 and she lived together with her younger sister, mother and grandparents, while her father was residing in Johor. Ng was known to be an avid cosplay lover and especially loved Japanese anime. Ng's grandfather wrote a heartfelt tribute to express his sadness over the murder of his granddaughter. Over 50 relatives and friends attended Ng's funeral on 25 October 2013; Ng's mother told the press that her daughter had a peaceful smile on her face even in death.

On 31 October 2013, ten days after he allegedly killed Ng, Poon was charged with murder. When asked by reporters why he did it, Poon reportedly said, "I don't know why I did it."

Given the circumstances as to how Poon and Ng met and befriend each other, there were lingering concerns on the safety of befriending strangers online and parents were cautioned to be mindful of their teenage children over their use of social media and making friends online.

== Trial of Poon Wai Hong ==
Poon Wai Hong, who was tried for killing Ng Yuk Tim.

At one point before his trial, in 2015, Poon's lawyers tried to negotiate for a plea bargain with the prosecution and reduce the murder charge to a lesser offence, but the prosecution refused the defence's request. When the trial was delayed in 2015 to a later date, the family of Ng were disappointed over the delay. Ng's grandmother reportedly told the press that she had been turning to religion to find solace over her granddaughter's death, and she said that Ng appeared in her dream, telling her grandmother that she was fine in the afterlife.

On 29 August 2016, after several delays, Poon Wai Hong officially stood trial at the Shah Alam High Court for murdering Ng Yuk Tim. It was the prosecution's case that Poon had thrice wielded the dumbbell to lethally hit Ng on the head after he attempted to have sex with her against her will.

During his trial, which dragged on for two years, Poon's main defence was that he had no intention to cause the death of Ng, when he was slated to take the stand on 15 March 2018. Based on his version of events, after he and Ng met up at his house, he requested to have sex with Ng and she agreed to. However, a friend had interrupted the duo and this caused Poon to head out. After Poon returned home, Ng did not want to have sex with him anymore, and this caused the young couple to argue with each other. This accumulated into a fight, during which Ng bit Poon on the hand and wielded a stun gun, and Poon claimed that he pushed Ng backwards and she fatally hit her head onto the dumbbell left onto his ground. Poon said his vision was blurred at the time since he lost his spectacles, and he only realized that Ng hit her head when recovering his spectacles, and also realized that Ng had died. Out of panic, Poon decided to hide the body by stuffing it into a suitcase and threw it somewhere in Kota Kemuning, Shah Alam. The defence argued that while Poon indeed killed Ng, his act of disposing the body did not necessarily mean he intended to commit murder, and there was no DNA on the dumbbell, which meant Poon might not have raised the dumbbell to beat Ng to death even though the dumbbell was ascertained to have caused some of the head injuries, and a fall could have contributed to the wounds.

On 3 April 2018, Justice Datuk Mohd Azman Husin of the Shah Alam High Court delivered his verdict. He rejected Poon's version of events, finding that his acts of hiding Ng's body inside the suitcase and disposed of the corpse after the killing showed that he had the intention to murder Ng and hide his crimes, and his version of the circumstances behind Ng's death was inconsistent with the autopsy report, and for this, Justice Mohd Azman decided that there were sufficient grounds to find Poon guilty of murder.

Upon his conviction for the murder of Ng Yuk Tim, Poon Wai Hong was sentenced to death by hanging. Ng's family welcomed the verdict, but they stated that Ng would not come back to life with the judgement and lamented that an appeal process would take place before Poon could face the hangman's knot.

== Death penalty repeal controversy ==
In October 2018, six months after Poon Wai Hong was sentenced to hang, the Malaysian government announced that the death penalty would be fully abolished in the country, where more than 1,100 people, including Poon, were held on death row for various capital crimes. The announcement sparked a huge public outcry from most Malaysians, given that the country was highly supportive of capital punishment, and specifically, the families of murder victims in Malaysia, including the family of Ng Yuk Tim, were greatly disappointed with the government's decision to abolish capital punishment.

In November 2018, Ng Yuk Tim's mother Sim Yee Ling and countless other people whose loved ones were murdered (including the mother of rape-murder victim Annie Kok Yin Cheng) gathered and rallied publicly to protest against the abolition of mandatory capital punishment and also condemned the human rights advocates for wanting to protect the rights of the killers on death row while neglecting the human rights of the victims.

Eventually, in April 2023, the Malaysian government elected to abolish both the mandatory death penalty and natural life imprisonment, and under the revised laws, any offenders convicted of murder would face either the death penalty or a jail term of 30 to 40 years.

== Poon's appeal ==
On 12 September 2019, a year after he was first sent to death row, Poon Wai Hong's appeal was heard before the Court of Appeal of Malaysia.

During the hearing, Poon's lawyer Rajpal Singh told the court that his client had no intention to cause death, since it started out of a fight that broke out from the argument over Ng's rejection of having sex with Poon. Singh also stated that Poon was bitten on the hand while trying to stop Ng from shouting, and pushed her to prevent her from attacking him with the stun gun, and he only realized Ng had fallen and hit her head onto the dumbbell when he found his spectacles. On the other hand, the prosecution argued that Poon's conviction should be upheld, and added that Poon did not call for medical help after Ng was down and he instead chose to dispose of the body, and hence his claims of accidentally killing Ng should be rejected.

The Court of Appeal deliberated over the submissions and made their ruling. The appellate court found that there was merit in Poon's appeal and accepted the defence's arguments that Poon more likely never had the intent to cause Ng's death, and it was unsafe to maintain the murder conviction and death sentence of Poon.

As such, the Court of Appeal dismissed the murder charge and hence revoked Poon's death sentence, and instead find him guilty of a lesser charge of culpable homicide not amounting to murder, or manslaughter in Malaysian legal context. Poon was consequently sentenced to 22 years' imprisonment, with the sentence backdated to the date of his arrest in October 2013. Under Malaysian law, the maximum punishment for manslaughter was 30 years in jail.

Ng's mother, who was present in court with her family members, was reportedly shocked and saddened by the fact that her daughter's killer escaped the gallows, and she urged the prosecution to appeal against the Court of Appeal judgement. She also accused the lawyer of Poon for making up stories about her daughter for the benefit of Poon and lamented that Poon might come out in less than nine years' time if he became eligible for parole due to good behaviour. Despite her disappointment, Ng's mother updated her social post a month later, wishing her daughter a happy 21st birthday and hoped for Ng to rest in peace.

== Prosecution's appeal and aftermath ==
After Poon's reprieve from the gallows, the prosecution confirmed that they would appeal to the Federal Court of Malaysia against the Court of Appeal's verdict.

On 3 September 2020, the date when the prosecution's appeal was first heard, Deputy Public Prosecutor Datuk Nazran Mohd Sham informed the Federal Court that after some deliberations over Poon's case, they decided to withdraw the appeal against the manslaughter conviction of Poon. The prosecution's official reasons were that they had thoroughly reviewed the Court of Appeal's judgement and found it more appropriate to convict Poon of manslaughter given the circumstances, and due to the recent landmark case of a man sentenced to 15 years' jail for manslaughter by stabbing the victim 19 times, the prosecution feared the possibility of Poon receiving a much lighter sentence than 22 years and their chances of reinstating the murder charge would not be high, and the potential setting of an adverse precedence in sentencing guidelines for manslaughter, and hence they chose to not proceed with their appeal against Poon's manslaughter charge.

This decision ultimately led to the Federal Court to confirm both Poon's manslaughter conviction and 22-year jail term, therefore putting the legal process to a close. Ng's family, including her mother, aunt and grandfather, were saddened and disappointed to hear that the prosecution dropped the appeal against Poon's conviction as they expected Poon to be re-convicted of murder and face the death penalty once more. Ng's mother told the press in an interview that she was unable to forget her daughter, and when a psychiatrist advised her to put the matter to a close after so many years of appealing the case, Ng's mother said that her love and longing would not be put to rest.

Even after the conclusion of the legal process, Ng's family still missed her and Ng's mother commemorated her daughter by celebrating her 22nd birthday a month after the prosecution dropped their appeal against Poon's reprieve. Ng's grandfather, despite his disappointment over the outcome, also expressed his gratitude to the support his family received throughout the ordeal. When Malaysian businessman Tan Sri Datuk Ng Teck Fong died in 2021, Ng's mother offered condolences and expressed her gratitude towards the late Datuk for providing her late daughter a scholarship and personally attending the funeral when her daughter died.

Since the conclusion of the court proceedings, Poon remains in prison serving his 22-year sentence. If he served time with good behavior, Poon would possibly be released on parole in 2027 after completing at least two-thirds of his jail term (equivalent to 14 years and eight months).

== See also ==
- Capital punishment in Malaysia
- List of solved missing person cases (post-2000)
