= Kajang Prison =

Prison in Malaysia

Kajang Prison Penjara Kajang
- Location within Selangor
- Location: Sungai Jelok, Kajang, Selangor, Malaysia; 3.004187°N 101.811919°E
- Status: Operational
- Security class: Medium-security
- Opened: 1985
- Managed by: Malaysian Prison Department

Kajang Prison (Malay: Penjara Kajang; formerly known as Selangor Central Prison) is a prison located in Sungai Jelok, Selangor, Malaysia.

== Notable prisoners ==
- Michael Denis McAuliffe – executed
- Zainuzzaman Mohamad Jasadi – hanged for the 1991 murder of popular child television presenter Intan Yusniza Mohamad Yunos
- Mona Fandey – executed in 2001 along with her husband and assistant
- Ariffin Agas, a former security guard found guilty of the 1992 Jalan Turi murders and hanged on 27 December 2002.
- Hanafi Mat Hassan, former bus driver and convicted killer hanged on 19 December 2008 for the murder of Noor Suzaily Mukhtar.
- Ahmad Najib bin Aris – rapist and murderer of Canny Ong, executed on 23 September 2016
- Najib Razak – a former Malaysian Prime Minister who is currently serving a 12 year sentence and a RM210 million fine for 3 counts for criminal breach of trust under Section 409 of the Penal Code 3 counts of money laundering under Section 4(1)(b) of Anti-Money Laundering Act, Anti-Terrorism Financing Act and Proceeds of Unlawful Activities Act and 1 count of abuse of power under Section 23 of the Malaysian Anti-Corruption Commission (MACC) Act 2009 starting 23 August 2022
- PU Azman, a former Islamic preacher, motivational expert, TV host, singer, and actor was sentenced to 24 years in prison and two strokes of the cane by the Klang Sessions Court after being found guilty of two charges of committing physical sexual assault against a 17-year-old male teenager.
- Paul Yong Choo Kiong, former Member of the Perak State Executive Council (EXCO) and former Member of the Perak State Legislative Assembly (MLA) for Tronoh who was convicted of raping his Indonesian maid. He was sentenced to eight years of jail and two strokes of cane. He was sent to the prison on 1 October 2025.
