= Murder of Lai Ying Xin =

2008 abduction and murder of a teenage girl in Malaysia

Lai Ying Xin
- Lai Ying Xin, pictured before her death
- Born: Lai Ying Xin; 16 April 1992; Malaysia
- Died: 11 September 2008 (aged 16); Kulai, Johor, Malaysia
- Cause of death: Strangulation
- Occupations: Student; Salesgirl (part time)
- Known for: Victim of a kidnap-murder case
- Parents: Lai Then Song (father); Chia Siew Peh (mother)

On 11 September 2008, in Kulai, Johor, Malaysia, 16-year-old schoolgirl and salesgirl Lai Ying Xin (Chinese: 赖映兴) was kidnapped and murdered by a group of four youths, who extorted a ransom from her family in spite of her death. The case became known as the "Kulai school beauty hostage-murder" (古来校花撕票案) in Malaysian Chinese newspapers, which extensively covered the case. The four youths, three of whom were below 18 years old while the fourth was 22, were subsequently arrested and charged with kidnapping and murdering Lai. The incident of Lai's kidnapping-turned-murder brought shock to the whole of Malaysia when it first came to light.

In 2011, the mastermind Teh Kim Hong (郑锦洪) was sentenced to death while two of Teh's co-defendants Leong Soon Long (梁顺龙) and Wong Soon Heng (黄顺兴), who were underaged at the time of the murder, were spared the gallows and detained indefinitely, and a fourth accused Wong Kah Wai (黄家伟), who was also underaged, was acquitted without his defence being called.

13 years later, after Malaysia abolished the mandatory death penalty and enabled murderers to face either death by hanging or a long prison sentence of 30 to 40 years instead, Teh filed an appeal to reduce his sentence, and in spite of the request of prosecutors and Lai's family for the death penalty, the Federal Court commuted Teh's death sentence to 40 years' imprisonment and 17 strokes of the cane in May 2024.

== Background of Lai Ying Xin ==
Born on 16 April 1992, Lai Ying Xin was the third of four children to Lai Then Song (赖添送 Lài Tiānsòng) and Chia Siew Peh (谢秀萍 Xiè Xiùpíng), and had two older sisters and one younger brother, and she grew up in Kulai, located in the Malaysian state of Johor. Lai enrolled into SMK Sultan Ibrahim, a notable secondary school in Kulai, to pursue her secondary school studies. Due to her natural beauty and kind-natured personality, Lai was the most popular schoolgirl in her school and well-liked by her friends, teachers and schoolmates alike.

Aside from being active in her school's extra-curricular activities, Lai was also an academically inclined student; she had once attained seven As and one B for her Penilaian Menengah Rendah (PMR) examinations, a national examination for third-year secondary school students in Malaysia (up until its abolition in 2014), and she had plans to further her studies in Taiwan after graduation and to become an air stewardess upon reaching adulthood. To make ends meet, Lai worked part-time as a salesgirl at a local shopping centre in Kulai.

== Disappearance and murder ==
On the night of 11 September 2008, 16-year-old Lai Ying Xin was last seen leaving a shopping mall in Kulai, where she worked part time as a salesgirl.

Lai did not return home that night, and during the next morning, on 12 September 2008, Lai's family received a phone call from an unknown caller. The caller claimed that he had kidnapped Lai, and he demanded a ransom of RM60,000 from Lai's family in exchange for Lai's freedom. Lai's family contacted the police and a special team of investigators was set up to monitor the situation while tracing the identities and whereabouts of Lai's abductor(s). Meanwhile, Lai's family tried to raise some money but within a day, they only managed to gather a total of RM33,000, and handed the money over to the kidnappers.

The police also did not give up tracing the identities of the kidnappers, and finally, on the evening of 15 September 2008, the police arrested seven male youths, but in the end, three of them were released after some questioning while the final four suspects were officially held in custody for their suspected involvement in the abduction of Lai, who was discovered to be dead. The suspects, who all admitted to their involvement, led the police to a forest near Taman Puteri Kulai, where the officers found the burnt body of 16-year-old Lai Ying Xin.

An autopsy report was later conducted by Dr Mohammed Aznool Haidy, and he certified that Lai had been strangled to death by her killers before her body was burnt, likely to destroy evidence. DNA tests were also conducted on the corpse, and the results confirmed that the charred remains discovered in Kulai belonged to Lai. After the autopsy, Lai's corpse was released to the family for funeral proceedings. Khoo Ting Loo, Lai's boyfriend, and many of her classmates and teachers attended her funeral, and many were saddened and mourned for Lai, whom they remembered as a good-natured girl popular in school for her looks and inner heart, as well as a filial and obedient daughter.

Updates of the investigative process revealed that all the four alleged kidnappers were known to the victim, as they had gone to or used to attend the same school as Lai. According to Lai's mother Chia Siew Peh, her daughter had reportedly rejected the advances of one of the kidnappers, who reportedly had a crush on her, and it was speculated that the kidnapper and his friends had acted out of revenge and abducted Lai before murdering her.

On 25 September 2008, ten days after their arrest, the four youths - 16-year-old Wong Soon Heng, 22-year-old Teh Kim Hong, 17-year-old Leong Soon Long and 16-year-old Wong Kah Wai - were officially charged with two counts - one for kidnapping and one for murder - in relation to the death of Lai Ying Xin. Given the fact that except for Teh, the rest were all confirmed to be underaged, Malaysian law decreed that any minors convicted of murder should not be given the mandatory death penalty but to be imprisoned indefinitely at the Sultan's pleasure on state level. The court proceedings were delayed at several points of time due to the need to complete the forensic report or DNA testing, and the four accused had at one point accused the policemen for mistreating them while in remand. The case was eventually transferred to the High Court of Johor for trial hearing on a date to be decided.

Through the case of Lai's killing, which made headlines nationwide in Malaysia, the increasing cases of youngsters, including minors below 18 committing crimes, sparked major concern from the public and authorities alike, and there were also discussions on the need to educate children on the right path to avoid them becoming juvenile criminals at a tender age.

== Trial of the kidnappers ==
The four kidnappers - Teh Kim Hong, Wong Soon Heng, Leong Soon Long and Wong Kah Wai - stood trial at the Johor High Court in 2010 for one count of murder and one count of kidnapping. The first charge of murder against the four carried the death penalty under Section 302 of the Malaysian Penal Code, while the second charge of kidnapping carried either the death penalty or life imprisonment with possible caning under the Kidnapping Act 1961 of Malaysia.

Based on the prosecution's case, it was alleged that on 11 September 2008, the date of Lai's disappearance, the four youths had abducted Lai shortly after she left her workplace, and proceeded to strangle her to death before they burnt the body to dispose of the evidence, and afterwards demanded ransom from Lai's family. The court was also told that one of the defendants had known Lai's parents, and pretended to meet up with them after seemingly horrified at the news of Lai's abduction, and stayed with the family in order to keep tabs on the family's movements. The accomplice had even persuaded Lai's parents to pay up the ransom under the pretense of wanting to bring Lai back alive.

Subsequently, at the close of the prosecution's case, the trial judge, Justice Mohd Zawawi Salleh, made his ruling on whether the defendants had a case to answer. Out of the four, Justice Mohd Zawawi found that there was insufficient evidence to prove the charges of murder and abduction against one of the four accused, Wong Kah Wai, and as a result, on 25 November 2010, Wong was acquitted of all charges without his defence being called. However, Justice Mohd Zawawi ruled on the other hand that a prima facie case was established against the remaining three accused - Wong Soon Heng, Teh Kim Hong, and Leong Soon Long - and they were ordered to put up their defence.

Teh took the stand to give his defence. He denied that he was a participant in the abduction-murder of Lai, and claimed that the car was borrowed to a friend on the date of Lai's murder, and the friend, who claimed to drive the car with his girlfriend for a date, had returned him the car at the hair salon where Teh worked as a hairstylist, and after retrieving the car, he found Lai's handphone inside his car but it did not raise his suspicions. Teh claimed that the police forced him to confess by physically abusing him with electrocution and forcing his head into a pail of water, and denied that he masterminded the murder. Leong and Wong both also similarly denied that they shared the common intention to kill Lai and also attempted to downplay their roles in the murder.

On 21 February 2011, Justice Mohd Zawawi Salleh found each member of the trio guilty of both charges. The sentencing was adjourned until 31 March 2011 at the Kuala Lumpur High Court, where Justice Mohd Zawawi delivered his verdict on sentence after he was transferred from Johor to Kuala Lumpur to continue his tenure on the Bench. In his judgement, Justice Mohd Zawawi stated that he considered the seriousness of the offences committed against Lai, and found that the trio, despite their young ages, had committed heinous crimes and were ruthless and violent, and also callously disposed of the corpse after killing Lai and burning her body, and that the trio had no conscience or remorse for depriving the life of a young girl and tormenting the victim's family, and it would be appropriate to impose the highest punishment warranted under the law.

However, out of the trio, both Leong and Wong were underaged at the time of the murder, and given that the death penalty was only permitted for offenders aged 18 and above at the time of any capital offence, the two of them were sentenced to indefinite detention at the Sultan of Johor's pleasure. On the other hand, 25-year-old Teh Kim Hong, being the only adult of the trio, was sentenced to the mandatory death penalty by hanging for murder and also given a second death sentence for the other charge of kidnapping.

Days after the sentencing of her daughter's killers, Lai's mother reportedly told the press that it was her wish to see justice served, and she was never absent through the dates when the convicts appeared in court for trial. Lai's mother said that she never received any apology from the families of the trio, whom she observed had not shown any remorse for murdering her daughter, although it was only once when a female relative nodded at Lai's mother, implying that she acknowledged the wrongdoing her son did.

== Fate of Teh Kim Hong ==
Teh Kim Hong
- Born: 4 June 1986 (age 40); Perak, Malaysia
- Status: Incarcerated
- Convictions: Murder; Kidnapping
- Penalty: 2 death sentences; commuted to 40 years' jail and 17 strokes of the cane
- Accomplices: Leong Soon Long (convicted); Wong Soon Heng (convicted); Wong Kah Wai (acquitted)

Details
- Victims: Lai Ying Xin (deceased)
- Date: 11 September 2008
- Country: Malaysia
- State: Johor
- Date apprehended: 15 September 2008

After he was sentenced to hang, Teh Kim Hong appealed to the higher courts against his conviction and sentence for kidnapping and murdering Lai Ying Xin. However, on 8 May 2013 and 19 October 2015 respectively, both the Court of Appeal and the Federal Court of Malaysia (the highest court of Malaysia) dismissed Teh's appeals, and finalized his two death sentences and conviction. Hence, Teh remained on death row awaiting his execution, which was suspended since 2018 by a nationwide moratorium, as the Malaysian government was reviewing the death penalty laws to decide on a potential abolition of capital punishment, which sparked major public opposition since it was first announced.

In April 2023, the Malaysian government agreed to keep the death penalty, but it would not be mandatory for murder and ten other offences, effectively abolishing the mandatory death penalty in Malaysia. Additionally, natural life imprisonment was also abolished, and life imprisonment in Malaysia was re-defined as a jail term of 30 to 40 years. Under the revised laws, which took effect in July 2023, anyone convicted of murder would face a possible death sentence, or alternatively a possible jail term of 30 to 40 years with possible caning. After the reform, all the offenders held on death row in Malaysia were given a chance to appeal for a reduction of their sentences, and Teh, who had spent the last 12 years on death row, applied for re-sentencing in his case.

On 16 May 2024, 38-year-old Teh Kim Hong's re-sentencing motion was heard at the Federal Court. During the hearing, Teh's lawyer K. S. Pang requested the court to substitute his client's death sentence to a long prison sentence for each count of murder and kidnapping, given that Teh was remorseful and had apologized to the victim's family, and he stated that the corpse of Lai Ying Xin was burnt after she was strangled and not before she died, merely to destroy the evidence rather than out of cold-hearted intent, and the death of Lai from strangulation was not prolonged, hence the case of Lai's murder was not abhorrent enough to be one of the worst cases of murder that deserved the death penalty. Pang also cited Teh's relatively young age of 22, and stated that he only committed the crime in a fit of recklessness and was not a hardened or remorseless criminal incapable of rehabilitation.

In rebuttal, the prosecution, led by Deputy Public Prosecutor Dhiya Syazwani Izyan Mohd Akhir, urged the Federal Court to uphold the death penalty in Teh's case, given that the victim was a vulnerable teenager who was 16 at the time of her death, and that the perpetrators had not only mercilessly deprived her of her life but also burnt her corpse, and the various aggravating factors highlighted in the abduction-killing of Lai made the death penalty appropriate for Teh.

After deliberating over the case, the Federal Court's three-judge panel, consisting of Tengku Maimun Tuan Mat, Datuk Zabariah Mohd Yusof and Datuk Abu Bakar Jais, delivered their verdict. The three judges, for reasons not made public, commuted Teh's two death sentences for kidnapping and murder to concurrent jail terms of 40 years each, the second-highest punishment presently warranted for both kidnapping and murder in Malaysia, which effectively allowed Teh to escape the gallows for abducting and murdering Lai back in 2008. Aside from the double jail terms, the Federal Court also added 17 strokes of the cane to Teh's sentence, five strokes for kidnapping and 12 strokes for murder, since Teh was 38 years old and below 50 at this point and thus still liable for caning under Malaysian law.

Since his 40-year jail term was backdated to the date of his arrest in September 2008, Teh, who spent a total of 16 years in prison, including 13 years on death row, would only have to serve another 24 years before he could be released, tentatively in September 2048 at the age of 62, although he could possibly be released early on parole after at least two-thirds of his sentence for good behaviour. On that same day when Teh escaped the gallows, 73-year-old A. Arokiasamy, who was formerly on death row for killing his sister-in-law in 2000, had his death sentence reduced to 33 years' jail by the Federal Court.

Since the end of his re-sentencing, Teh remains in prison serving a 40-year sentence.

== Aftermath ==
=== Reactions on Teh Kim Hong's commutation ===
In the aftermath of Teh's reprieve from the gallows in 2024, Lai Ying Xin's family, including her mother and elder sister, were angered and disappointed in the Federal Court's ruling, given that they wanted Teh to be executed for murdering Lai, and expressed their disagreement with the 40-year jail term meted out by the Federal Court. The Lai family reportedly wanted to seek available legal help to attempt to appeal for the death penalty for Teh, and they also stated they were fearful that Teh, who would possibly be released in the next 24 years' time, might go after their family should he ever be freed, as they recalled that none of the perpetrators ever apologized or shown any true remorse during the court process back in 2011.

Many members of the public were similarly outraged at the news of Teh escaping the hangman's noose for the death of Lai, which remained as one of Malaysia's most horrific crimes to date in recent years. In response to the public backlash and the family's outcry against Teh's reprieve, Deputy Minister of Communications Teo Nie Ching, a Malaysian politician and lawyer, stated that the public should not jump to conclusions and doubt the integrity of the law based on the decision of the Federal Court in Teh's case, as she did not know the exact reasons behind the Federal Court's reasons to spare Teh from the gallows despite the prosecution's arguments for a death sentence, and would need to wait until it was fully released to the public before making the stance clear. Teo also stated that she believed that the judge Tengku Maimun Tuan Mat was an upright person in spite of her ruling of Teh's case, given that she was the same judge that sent former Prime Minister Najib Razak to prison for corruption. Teo also told the press that she had spoken to Lai's family regarding the case, and had informed them that the Federal Court's decision was final and there would be no chance to appeal against the Federal Court judgement.

The case of Lai Ying Xin's kidnap-cum-killing was referred to by another lawyer during the re-sentencing hearing of Shahril Jaafar on 29 May 2024; Shahril was convicted of the 2006 rape-murder of a female jogger Chee Gaik Yap. Shahril's lawyer, Rosli Kamarudin, cited that compared to Teh, who faced two charges of kidnapping and murder, Shahril was only convicted of one count of murder, and hence he should not hang for murdering Chee, and based on his participation in rehabilitation programmes, Shahril showed a good chance of rehabilitation and also showed regret for his crime. However, the Federal Court rejected Shahril's appeal and finalized his death sentence after accepting the prosecution's submission that the murder of Chee was the "rarest of rare" case with exceptional circumstances that shocked the societal conscience, where Shahril had violently and callously took the life of Chee after abducting, raping and sodomizing her, and hence they were constrained to subject Shahril to capital punishment for the heinous crime.

Ng Kian Nam, a Malaysian lawyer, contributed an opinion piece to the local Chinese newspaper Sin Chew Daily on 31 May 2024 (two weeks after the commutation of Teh's death sentence). In the article, Ng questioned the Federal Court's decision to commute Teh's death sentence to 40 years in jail due to the heinous nature of Lai's murder. He stated that the revised capital punishment laws in Malaysia should not be made retroactive as the review of all the death row cases, precisely about 1,000 or higher, would lead to the courts channelling resources into such proceedings when these resources should have been put to better use like protection of vulnerable people from crimes, helping disadvantaged groups in society and addressing societal ills, and these reviews were equivalent to reopening the wounds of the families of murder victims who desperately wanted justice to be served. Ng also compared the rape-murder of Chee Gaik Yap to the case of Lai's death, questioning what was the difference in terms of brutality and degree of callousness that allowed Teh to escape the gallows in contrast to the killer responsible for Chee's death, for which the Federal Court had yet to give reasons why they spared Teh's life at this point in time.

In June 2024, a month after the re-sentencing of Teh, Datuk Seri Azalina Othman Said revealed in Parliament that out of all the 474 death row applications heard in Malaysia between November 2023 and 31 May 2024, there were 19 people (all of whom were convicted of murder) who failed to have their death sentences reduced while the rest, including Teh, had their sentences of death lowered to jail terms ranging between 30 and 40 years. Teh's case was noted to be one of the most high-profile cases of re-sentencing brought before the courts, given the gravity of his offence and the public response to his case.

=== Fate of Leong Soon Long and Wong Soon Heng ===
In March 2025, Leong Soon Long and Wong Soon Heng, together with five other ex-child convicts who were sentenced to detention at the pleasure of the Rulers under the Child Act 2001, filed for a judicial review application at the Federal Court. They argued that a series of significant changes on death penalty laws in 2023 have rendered the punishment of detention at the pleasure of the Rulers unconstitutional, where adult convicts were allowed to reduce their death sentence and natural life imprisonment into a fixed jail term through a court review, while child offenders were subjected to an indefinite length of imprisonment under the Child Act, thereby violating their constitutional rights under Article 5 (right to life) and Article 8 (equality before the law) of the Federal Constitution.

Their case were initially slated to be heard by the Federal Court on 24 November 2025, but was delayed to early 2026 after one of the judges, Ahmad Terrirudin Salleh, was recused due to him being involved in the 2023 legislative changes contented in the case as he have served as solicitor general and attorney general of Malaysia during that period.

On 20 April 2026, the Federal Court in a unanimous decision delivered by federal judge Collin Lawrence Sequerah rejected their application for leave (permission) to review the constitutionality of their indefinite detention. The court ruled that there are already review mechanism under Section 97(4) of the Child Act 2001, where their sentence were subjected to mandatory yearly review by the Board of Visiting Justices, who would recommend on their continued detention or early release to the Rulers. The court also stated that there are remedial pathways under Regulations 53 and 113 of the Prison Regulations 2000, which allowed them to petition to the Rulers for pardons or have their sentence be reviewed the authority on a quadrennial basis.

As of 2026, the current status of one of Teh's accomplice —Wong Kah Wai— remains unknown, while the April 2026 court judgement shown that Leong Soon Long's and Wong Soon Heng's pardon applications are still pending.

== See also ==
- Capital punishment in Malaysia
