= Chee Gaik Yap rape and murder =

2006 rape and murder of a female jogger in Malaysia

Chee Gaik Yap
- Chee Gaik Yap, who was missing for nine hours before her body was discovered
- Born: Chee Gaik Yap; 31 August 1981; Kedah, Malaysia
- Died: 14 January 2006 (aged 24); Sungai Petani, Kedah, Malaysia
- Cause of death: Fatal stab wound to the neck
- Education: Universiti Utara Malaysia
- Occupation: Marketing executive
- Known for: Victim of a rape-murder case
- Parents: Chee Ah Sau (father); Lim Kim Nai (mother)
- Family: Five siblings

On 14 January 2006, at Sungai Petani in Kedah, Malaysia, 24-year-old Chee Gaik Yap (Chinese: 朱玉叶; pinyin: Zhū Yùyè), a Chinese Malaysian who was last seen jogging with her sister, went missing, and was found dead nine hours later with multiple stab wounds all over her body. Evidence showed that Chee had been abducted, raped, sodomized and in the end, murdered by her attacker, who was not caught until six years later, when the suspect was arrested at Kuala Lumpur International Airport after arriving from Perth.

The perpetrator, Shahril Jaafar, who was the son of a Datuk businessman, was initially set free in June 2013 after being found not guilty of the crime, but following the prosecution's appeal and a re-trial, Shahril was found guilty of murdering Chee and sentenced to the mandatory death penalty by the Alor Setar High Court in August 2015.

Shahril's appeals to the Court of Appeal and Federal Court were rejected in 2016 and 2018 respectively, and in 2024, after Malaysia's abolition of mandatory death sentences, Shahril filed a re-sentencing motion to commute his death sentence but his appeal ultimately failed, after the Federal Court found it appropriate to sentence Shahril to hang for the rape-murder of Chee, which the prosecution described as the "rarest of rare" case of murder in Malaysia. Shahril is currently on death row as of 2024.

== Chee's murder ==
On the evening of 14 January 2006, 24-year-old marketing executive Chee Gaik Yap was last seen jogging together with her younger sister Chee Gaik Choon (Chinese: 朱玉春; pinyin: Zhū Yùchūn) at a park nearby their house in Sungai Petani, located in the Malaysian state of Kedah.

On that fateful evening, Chee offered to accompany her younger sister Gaik Choon, who wanted to go for an evening jog, as she was concerned for her sister's safety. At around 6pm, the two sisters began to jog along the track at the Cinta Sayang Club at Taman Ria Jaya. Chee Gaik Yap, who was more athletic and trained in martial arts, ran faster than her younger sister and was way ahead until Gaik Choon lost sight of her sister. By the time the sisters were supposed to go home, Gaik Choon could not find Chee and thus, she went back home under the assumption that her sister had already gone back home. However, Chee's sister discovered that Chee had not returned when she reached home. Chee's sister returned to the jogging track to find her again, and after a search, she found an abandoned shoe that belonged to Chee and there were bloodstains on the area itself. Horrified at this, Chee's sister contacted her family to inform them of Chee's disappearance, and a police report was lodged thereafter. A huge team of policemen, together with Chee's family and friends, searched for Chee by combing the nearby areas for traces of her.

At 2.30am on 15 January 2006, nine hours after Chee went missing, a passer-by discovered the body of a woman near a golf course not far from where Chee had jogged. The woman's semi-naked corpse was abandoned in some thick undergrowth, and had multiple injuries on her body. The police were alerted to the finding and through identification procedures, the deceased was identified as 24-year-old Chee Gaik Yap.

An autopsy report by Dr Mohammad Zaini from the Hospital Sultanah Bahiyah of Alor Setar found that Chee sustained a total of 50 injuries (including stab wounds) all over her body, and that she had been raped and sodomized prior to her death, based on the sexual injuries discovered at her private parts. Out of these injuries, a stab wound on Chee's neck, measured 15 cm long, was sufficient in the ordinary course of nature to cause death, as the severity of the wound resulted in Chee dying from massive blood loss.

Background information revealed that Chee Gaik Yap was the third of six children and came from a financially poor family, and she was the only one out of the six to enter and complete university. Chee graduated from Universiti Utara Malaysia and was working as a marketing executive for only four months before she was killed, and she had plans for job training in Germany before she met her untimely end. Chee left behind her parents, her five siblings and a niece at the time she died; her father Chee Ah Sau (Chinese: 朱亚寿; pinyin: Zhū Yàshòu) was working as a carpenter at the time of her murder.

== Investigations and Shahril's arrest ==
The case was classified as murder, and investigating officers of the Royal Malaysia Police were dispatched to investigate the murder of Chee Gaik Yap. Originally, there were 12 suspects arrested in connection to the crime, but they were all released by February 2006 after the police found insufficient evidence against them. As the investigation process dragged on, the police were unable to find crucial clues to solve the case, and the case itself gradually became cold.

Despite the lack of progress, Chee's family and their supporters (including prominent political figures from Malaysia) continually called for the authorities to not give up investigating the murder. A police spokesperson in 2008 made a public statement to confirm that the police would regularly make updates in investigating cold cases, and he also personally provided his contact information for those who could provide assistance in cracking the case of Chee's rape-murder. Aside from the Chee Gaik Yap case, the police also appealed for new information to crack an unsolved double murder at Alor Setar, where two women - Teoh Mooi Peng (钟美萍 Zhōng Měipíng) and Leong Mooi Leng (梁美玲 Liáng Měilíng) - were kidnapped and brutally murdered by unknown assailants in 2001. The killer(s) were never found despite extensive efforts to solve the double killings.

In 2009, a major breakthrough was made in the investigation process, and the police once again scoured through a list of suspects, all of whom they brought in for questioning and to undergo DNA tests. After the DNA test results came out, it was found that the DNA of the semen samples matched to one of those suspects examined in the DNA testing. The suspect was identified as 28-year-old Shahril Jaafar, who was a Malaysian citizen and car dealer living in Sungei Petani, which was near the murder scene. Shahril's father was Datuk Jaafar Jamaludin, an affluent jewellery businessman based in Malaysia, and Shahril had several siblings and a wife, with whom he had a child. However, by the time the DNA test results were released, Shahril, who was released on police bail soon after participating in the DNA test, had already left Malaysia for Australia on the same day he was released. The police therefore placed Shahril on the wanted list and made efforts to trace his whereabouts.

Three years after he fled Malaysia, on 17 January 2012, three days after Chee's sixth death anniversary, 31-year-old Shahril Jaafar returned from Perth, Australia to the Kuala Lumpur International Airport for unknown reasons. Upon his arrival, Shahril was arrested for his suspected involvement in the murder. On 2 February 2012, Shahril appeared at the Sungai Petani Magistrate's Court, where he was officially charged with murdering 24-year-old Chee Gaik Yap six years prior. State Criminal Investigation Department chief assistant commissioner Zakaria Ahmad told the Malaysian press that the police had been working tirelessly to trace Shahril's whereabouts and also cooperated with their international counterparts to bring him to justice. If Shahril was found guilty of murder under Malaysian law, he would be sentenced to death.

== Original trial and acquittal ==
A year after he was arrested, Shahril Jaafar stood trial at the Alor Setar High Court on 25 February 2013. The prosecution's case was that Shahril had abducted Chee while she was jogging, and had raped and sodomized her inside the forest outskirts of Sungei Petani before he knifed her to death. A forensic pathologist testified that the stab wounds inflicted to Chee's neck were likely to be delivered while she was in a semi-conscious state in view of her head injuries and she was also likely stabbed while she was standing. The pathologist Mohammad Zaini, however, could not ascertain if the murder of Chee was done by a lone killer or multiple assailants, but he was certain that the sexual injuries, which also showed signs of torture, were caused at least 12 hours before Chee died and that the probable murder weapon was a double-edged knife based on the wounds inflicted. Other witnesses, including Chee's sister Gaik Choon, were called to testify during the trial. Gaik Choon told the court that while searching for her missing sister, she witnessed a black car driving around the area where she found her sister's bloodstained shoe, and based on its description, the car was confirmed to belong to Shahril.

On 25 June 2013, the Alor Setar High Court ruled that the prosecution failed to prove a prima facie case against the accused and therefore acquitted 31-year-old Shahril Jaafar of killing Chee without calling for his defence. The trial judge, Judicial Commissioner Datuk Mohd Zaki Abdul Wahab, stated that the forensic evidence showed that Chee died as a result of stab wounds to the neck and not due to injuries on the private parts so the prosecution had failed to prove that Shahril had caused the injuries that caused her death, and he also found that the prosecution only relied on the fact that Shahril was living at Kelab Cinta Sayang, which was near the murder scene, and stated that the DNA on the semen found could not be conclusively linked to Shahril, and therefore discharged him and granted him an acquittal.

Upon hearing that Shahril was acquitted of his daughter's murder, Chee Ah Sau was so devastated and distraught that he tried to commit suicide by falling off the parapet of the court building, much to the shock of many reporters, some of whom managed to restrain him before he could fall off. Subsequently, the Chee family wished to have the case reviewed and her father wanted to engage prominent lawyer and politician Karpal Singh to seek justice for his daughter. Penang Chief Minister and DAP secretary-general Lim Guan Eng later confirmed to the press that Karpal agreed to conduct a watching brief for the Chee family. Ong Kok Fooi, a Malaysian politician who constantly keep in touch with the Chee family to inquire their welfare, was similarly disappointed with the verdict.

== Re-trial and death penalty ==
Shahril Jaafar
- Born: 1981 (age 44–45); Kedah, Malaysia
- Status: Incarcerated on death row
- Conviction: Murder
- Penalty: Death

Details
- Victims: Chee Gaik Yap (deceased)
- Date: 14 January 2006
- Country: Malaysia
- State: Kedah
- Date apprehended: 17 January 2012

The prosecution filed a notice of appeal against the acquittal of Shahril in July 2013. Deputy Public Prosecutor (DPP) Awang Amardajaya Awang Mahmud, who argued before the Court of Appeal, stated that it was not disputed that the first four swabs of seminal fluid and blood taken from Chee's private part had 100 per cent matched Shahril's DNA, while the fifth swab also collected a foreign substance which could be caused by contamination due to the body being found in the forest, and DPP Awang also pointed out that Shahril's decision to jump bail and flee Malaysia soon after undergoing DNA tests also strongly suggested that Shahril was trying to abscond from something and that he had a guilty mind.

In October 2014, the Court of Appeal, led by Judge Linton Albert, overturned the acquittal after finding that the strength of the prosecution's case against Shahril was sufficient to call for his defence, and ordered a re-trial to take place before the original trial judge in the Alor Setar High Court. Shahril was scheduled to enter his defence on 28 December 2014. Shahril's counsel tried asking for their client to return to court in January 2015 as his wife was in confinement after giving birth, but the request was rejected.

Shahril, who returned to court on 28 December 2014, did not go to the stand but made an unsworn statement on the dock, denying that he committed the murder. According to Shahril, Shahril met a friend, whom he only knew as "Wayne", and asked him to bring him a non-Malay girl in her 20s for sex on that same day when Chee was killed. Shahril said that he met a Chinese girl later that day near the Cinta Sayang Club after contacting Wayne, and the girl, whom he claimed to be Chee, entered his car and they had unprotected sex with each other, and Chee asked for a payment of RM350. Shahril stated that after his sexual encounter with Chee, he left the car to receive a phone call from his mother, and Chee left his car while he was conversing with his mother, and that was the last time he saw her alive. Shahril testified that he drove the car alone thereafter to fetch his mother after she completed a golf tournament at the club. Shahril stated that he only got wind of Chee's death when he read the newspapers the next day and Wayne was uncontactable since the day he first and last met Chee.

Shahril's father Datuk Jaafar Jamaludin was one of the defence's witnesses, but the prosecution sought to impeach his testimony, given that Jaafar had earlier told the police that he disposed of a knife his son allegedly used to kill Chee and sold off the car which his son drove on the day of the murder, and yet in court, Jaafar gave a different account and denied knowing the existence of the murder weapon and also claimed he sold off the car just to procure a larger one. There were no orders made to arrest Shahril's father despite suspicions that he was an accomplice of his son's crime.

On 2 June 2015, the defence and prosecution made their closing submissions. Shahril's lawyer Shamsul Sulaiman argued that Shahril was not guilty, pointing out that there were gaps in the prosecution's case. One point he brought up was that the DNA on the victim could not have necessarily belonged to Shahril and might have belonged to a third person, and the forensic evidence could neither confirm that Chee was raped nor that she shared consensual sex with Shahril. Shamsul stated that while he conceded that the death of Chee was the work of a ruthless and cold-blooded killer, he argued that Shahril was not responsible for the crime and there were no witnesses who could prove directly that Shahril had abducted Chee in broad daylight before killing her. He also argued that Shahril's reasons to leave the country was not a testament to him escaping the law but was due to underlying immigration problems that were raised beforehand and therefore necessitated his need for departure.

In rebuttal, the prosecution, led by Salim Soib, argued that Shahril should be convicted as charged for the killing of Chee. They stated that it was baseless for Shahril to claim that he had consensual sex with Chee, whom he falsely painted as a sex worker, and it would be suspicious for Shahril to have sex with a stranger inside a car rather than other places like his own house, and there would have been the use of a condom if Chee was really a sex worker like Shahril claimed. The prosecution also stated that the DNA tests did not necessarily mean that there was a third person involved, given that the corpse of Chee was abandoned for hours in the forest before it was discovered and it would have contaminated the forensic samples, and the presence of Shahril's DNA had proven that he was involved one way or another in the crime. The prosecution also urged the court to impeach the evidence of Shahril's father due to the multiple discrepancies in his statements and testimony, and added that right after doing the DNA test, Shahril immediately booked a flight to Australia and left Malaysia on that same day, which showed that he was trying to flee Malaysia to avoid capture, and therefore urged the court to convict him of murder. The verdict was adjourned until 9 August 2015.

On 9 August 2015, Judicial Commissioner Datuk Mohd Zaki Abdul Wahab delivered his verdict. Having deliberated the case, Judicial Commissioner Mohd Zaki found that the defence had failed to raise a reasonable doubt over the prosecution's case, and he also accepted the prosecution's arguments in relation to Shahril's guilt and the need to impeach Shahril's father. On these grounds, Judicial Commissioner Mohd Zaki found Shahril guilty of the murder of Chee Gaik Yap. Upon his conviction, Shahril was sentenced to death by hanging as under Malaysian law, the death penalty was mandatory for all murder offences under Section 302 of the Malaysian Penal Code.

Chee's father reportedly expressed that he was relieved at the judgement, but he would not lay his heart to rest for this moment since he wanted to see to it that Shahril's execution was carried out for murdering his daughter.

== Appeal process ==
=== Court of Appeal of Malaysia ===
After he was sentenced to hang, Shahril appealed to the Court of Appeal against his murder conviction and death sentence.

Shahril's lawyer Shamsul Sulaiman submitted that his client was not the one that caused Chee Gaik Yap's death, stating that even though Shahril admitted to meeting the woman during the evening before her death, he insisted that Chee was still alive when she left him, and he also denied that he raped Chee, insisting that he had consensual sex with the victim. This was rebutted by the prosecution, led by Hamdan Hamzah, who argued that the defence given by Shahril were an afterthought he made up in order to escape the murder charge.

On 29 November 2016, a three-judge panel chaired by Justice Datuk Mohd Zawawi Salleh unanimously dismissed Shahril's appeal. Justice Mohd Zawawi, whose ruling was jointly decided with Justice Datuk Ahmadi Asnawi and Justice Datuk Kamardin Hashim, pronounced in the verdict that the evidence were sufficient to support the charge of murder against Shahril, and the trial court did not commit any error in determining Shahril's guilt. Chee's father welcomed the verdict, but he stated he could not completely ignore that Shahril might again appeal to escape the gallows.

=== Federal Court of Malaysia ===
After losing his appeal to the Court of Appeal, Shahril further appealed to the Federal Court of Malaysia, the highest court of Malaysia.

On 25 January 2018, the Federal Court decided to reject Shahril's appeal, with all five judges - Chief Justice Raus Sharif, Justice Hasan Lah, Justice Zaharah Ibrahim, Justice Jeffrey Tan and Justice Alizatul Khair Osman Khairuddin - unanimously agreeing that Shahril was responsible for the rape and murder of Chee Gaik Yap based on the circumstantial evidence and forensic evidence against him.

The date of the Federal Court's judgement was the 61st birthday of Chee's father Chee Ah Sau. Chee's father was relieved and glad to hear that the apex court affirmed Shahril's murder conviction and death penalty, and stated that justice was served for his daughter. Chee Ah Sau celebrated his birthday for the first time in 12 years on the date of the Federal Court's judgement, stating that the legal outcome was the best birthday present he ever gotten after 12 years of waiting for justice to arrive.

With all his appeals exhausted, Shahril's final recourse was to appeal for a royal pardon from the state ruler through the Pardons' Board, which may commute his death sentence to life imprisonment if approved.

== 2024 re-sentencing motion ==
=== Abolition of mandatory death penalty ===
In October 2018, nine months after Shahril Jaafar lost his final appeal, the Malaysian government announced that there would be a law review and the death penalty would be fully abolished in the country, where more than 1,100 people, including Shahril, were held on death row for various capital crimes. The announcement sparked a huge public outcry and anger from most Malaysians, given that the country was highly supportive of capital punishment. Specifically, for the families whose loved ones were murdered, including Chee and some other high-profile murder victims (like Annie Kok Yin Cheng), they were saddened and disappointed in the government's decision, stating that there would be no justice served if the killers who took innocent lives in cold blood were allowed to escape the gallows. Chee Gaik Yap's father Chee Ah Sau was among the most vocal of these family members, stating that he opposed to the abolition of capital punishment. He stated that he waited desperately for justice to be served over the past 12 years and his chances of closure was shattered with the possibility that Shahril would evade the hangman's noose and come out of prison one day. Similarly, one of Chee's sisters expressed that she would not accept the reality of abolishing the death penalty as it would mean that their efforts to seek justice for her late sister would go to naught.

Chee's family and countless other families whose loved ones fell victim to murder also gathered in November 2018 to express their opposition to the abolition of capital punishment, and they also slammed the human rights advocates for wanting to protect the rights of the killers on death row while neglecting the human rights of the victims.

In response, the government replied that the death penalty would not be completely removed and instead, there would be potential discretion for judges to decide between the death penalty or a minimum jail term of 30 years. Even so, a moratorium on Malaysia's upcoming executions was still in effect after the announcement. Prior to this, Malaysia's last execution happened on 24 May 2017, when 48-year-old Yong Kar Mun, who was convicted of discharging a firearm during a robbery, and another unnamed man who was convicted of murder and spent over 20 years on death row, were both hanged at Sungai Buloh Prison on the same day.

In another news update in January 2020, Chee's father and the relatives of seven other murder victims - Anthony Kevin Morais, Sosilawati Lawiya, Stephen Wong Jing Kui, Annie Kok Yin Cheng, Datuk Mohd Mazlan Idris, Muhammad Hafiz Idris and Nurulhanim Idris - gathered together to petition to the government to not abolish the death penalty.

In April 2023, the Malaysian government officially abolished the mandatory death penalty, and additionally abolished natural life imprisonment, and the revised laws took effect in July of that same year. The changes to the law allowed judges to have the discretion to impose either the death penalty or a jail term of 30 to 40 years for whichever crimes punishable by death, including murder. For male convicts who were less than 50 years of age at the time of sentencing, they would be given caning not less than 12 strokes. The 1,000 or so prisoners who were on death row or serving natural life sentences were given a chance to appeal for the commutation of their sentences, and in November 2023, the first batch of 11 prisoners, seven on death row and four who received natural life jail terms, had their sentences reduced to 30 years' imprisonment each. A total of 936 applications were filed from death row inmates in Malaysia to reduce their sentences since September 2023.

Shahril, whose avenues of appeal were exhausted since 2018, also submitted his appeal to commute his death sentence.

=== Re-sentencing bid and outcome ===
On 29 May 2024, the Federal Court of Malaysia heard the re-sentencing appeal of Shahril, who was then 43 years old.

In the hearing, Shahril's lawyer Rosli Kamaruddin implored the court to commute his client's death sentence to a jail term of 30 to 40 years instead, stating that Shahril deserved a second chance to live as he made efforts to undergo rehabilitation programmes and showed remorse for his actions. It was revealed that Shahril's father died in 2023, a year before Shahril stood before the Federal Court for re-sentencing. Rosli also pointed out that the case itself was not the worst or rarest out of the murders heard in court, given that even former death row inmate Teh Kim Hong, who was the mastermind of 2008 high-profile abduction-murder of Lai Ying Xin (赖映兴 Lài Yìngxīng) in Kulai, was given 40 years in jail earlier this month despite the prosecution's urgings for the death penalty. Rosli cited that compared to Teh, who faced two charges of kidnapping and murder, Shahril was only convicted of one count of murder, and hence he should not hang, and he also stated that the 50 injuries did not necessarily mean that all of them were severe wounds.

However, the prosecution, led by Deputy Public Prosecutor (DPP) Datuk Mohd Dusuki Mokhtar and DPP Solehah Noratikah Ismail, argued that Shahril should be sentenced to death, submitting that the rape and murder of Chee Gaik Yap was the "rarest of rare" case where only the death penalty was called for, stating that Shahril had kidnapped Chee before he brutally raped, sodomized and finally killed her, and there were at least 50 wounds found on Chee's corpse, including her private parts. DPP Dusuki also pointed out that Shahril attempted to evade justice by fleeing to Australia and hid there for three years before he was finally caught at Kuala Lumpur International Airport, and said that Chee was merely an innocent victim who only gone out jogging with her sister and was just fresh out of university, looking forward for a new life and this was destroyed by Shahril's heinous actions.

On that same day, the Federal Court delivered their verdict. The three judges - Justice Datuk Harmindar Singh Dhaliwal, Justice Datuk Nordin Hassan, and Justice Datuk Abu Bakar Jais - reiterated that while the court was not incapable of compassion and mercy, they found that the murder of Chee was an exceptional case with exceptional circumstances, where the deceased had suffered exceptional violence at the hands of Shahril, who had abducted Chee before he violently raped, sodomized and murdered her on that fateful evening of 14 January 2006. Justice Harmindar, who pronounced the judgement in court, stated that the case had taken place in broad daylight and it greatly shocked the public conscience given the ruthless and gruesome nature of Chee's death.

Reiterating that the court's decision was not bound by public opinion, Justice Harmindar state that the bench was constrained to find that based on the various factors behind the case, the only appropriate sentence for Shahril in relation to Chee's murder was the death penalty, and that his application was ought to be dismissed. As such, the Federal Court upheld Shahril's death sentence, and Shahril lost his final chance to escape the gallows.

In response to this decision, Chee Ah Sau was happy and relieved that the death penalty was affirmed for his daughter's murder, and he also told the press that it was difficult for him to let go of the experience of losing his daughter 18 years ago, but added that he would slowly start to seek closure. Ong Kok Fooi, a Malaysian politician who was constantly in touch with the Chee family, stated that when she heard of Shahril's appeal, she was concerned over the health of Chee's father and asked Chee's siblings to take care of their father, and she was similarly glad to hear that Shahril lost his appeal, because she felt that he deserved to hang for murdering Chee.

Out of all the 474 death row applications heard in Malaysia between November 2023 and 31 May 2024, Shahril was one of the 19 people whose death sentences were finalized after their re-sentencing applications were rejected by the Federal Court. According to Datuk Seri Azalina Othman Said, who brought forward this information in Parliament, these 19 condemned (whose identities were not publicly revealed) were all convicted of murder, which involved one victim or more victims, and child murder.

== Current status ==
Since the loss of his re-sentencing motion in 2024, Shahril remains incarcerated on death row awaiting his execution, which has not been scheduled.

== Aftermath ==
When the rape and murder of Chee Gaik Yap first came to light, many Malaysians were shocked by the exceptional violence and brutality. There were calls for justice to be served, and many supported the verdict of death in Shahril's case. In January 2014, months after the acquittal of Shahril Jaafar, Chee's family members, several politicians and about 300 supporters, many of whom from Kedah, Kuala Lumpur, Penang and Taiping, rallied at Wat Damrong Ratanaram to urge the government to fulfill the ends of justice for Chee. Even a sister of Teoh Mooi Peng, who was murdered in 2001, also joined in to support the family, and in another article, Teoh's sister also expressed her gratitude to Chee's father for emphasizing with their pain of losing a loved one to a cold-blooded murderer.

The Chee Gaik Yap rape and murder case was known to be one of Malaysia's most notorious murder cases to date. It was discussed in 2020 in light of the question of whether Malaysia should abolish the death penalty. Additionally, when a 2021 incident of jokes made about rape was widely publicized, the case of Chee's rape-cum-murder regained attention once again, given that a commentator wrote in an opinion piece to a newspaper that rape was an unforgivable crime to befall on any woman.

Chee's family, especially her father, also continually pursued justice for her and put their faith in the law. Throughout the years, Chee's father suffered from poor health, and on 15 February 2017, he was diagnosed with second-stage lymphoma cancer, and he accepted treatment and gradually recovered. As of 2024, Chee's father's condition was in remission. The family continued to visit Chee's resting place regularly to pay respects to her.

Two days after Shahril lost his re-sentencing application, a Malaysian lawyer named Ng Kian Nam contributed an opinion piece to the local Chinese newspaper Sin Chew Daily on 31 May 2024. Ng questioned and stated that the revised capital punishment laws in Malaysia should not be made retroactive as the review of all the death row cases, precisely about 1,000 or higher, would lead to the courts channelling resources into such proceedings when these resources should have been put to better use like protection of vulnerable people from crimes, helping disadvantaged groups in society and addressing societal ills, and these reviews were equivalent to reopening the wounds of the families of murder victims who desperately wanted justice to be served. He cited the case of Chee Gaik Yap's murder as one of these controversial re-sentencing hearings of death row inmates, and he also criticised the progress in investigations that partially contributed to justice being delayed in Chee's case, adding in his personal opinion that should the investigation process was more meticulous and Shahril did not escape to Australia for three years, as well as the High Court did not issue an acquittal at first in 2013, Shahril would have had been hanged by 2018 for the rape and murder of Chee. He also compared the abduction-murder of Lai Ying Xin to the Chee Gaik Yap case, questioning what was the difference in terms of brutality and degree of callousness that allowed the ringleader of Lai's murder to escape the gallows in contrast to Shahril.

== See also ==
- Capital punishment in Malaysia
