= Murder of Canny Ong =

Convicted murderer in Malaysia

Ahmad Najib
- Born: 1976; Muar, Johor, Malaysia
- Died: 23 September 2016 (aged 39–40); Kajang Prison, Selangor, Malaysia
- Cause of death: Execution by hanging
- Status: Executed on 23 September 2016
- Convictions: Murder (1 count) and rape (1 count)
- Penalty: Death (murder) (23 February 2005); 20 years' imprisonment and 10 strokes of the cane (rape) (23 February 2005)

Details
- Victims: 1 confirmed (convicted), 4 alleged
- Date: 13–14 June 2003
- Country: Malaysia
- States: Pantai Dalam, Kuala Lumpur, Selangor
- Date apprehended: 20 June 2003

Ahmad Najib bin Aris (1976 – 23 September 2016) was a Malaysian convicted murderer who in 2003 raped and killed Canny Ong, a US-based Malaysian information technology analyst. The crime received widespread media attention in Malaysia. He was sentenced to death in 2005 after being found guilty in a highly publicised trial. Over the next 11 years, he made multiple failed appeals against his sentence and was executed on 23 September 2016, more than 13 years after Ong's murder. Ahmad Najib was also alleged to have committed at least four offences of rape involving four different women, but was never formally charged in connection with those allegations.

== Early life ==
Ahmad Najib bin Aris was born and raised in Muar, Malaysia, sometime in 1976. He was the second of four siblings. He studied until Form Three before leaving school to work and support his family. In 1998, he moved to Kuala Lumpur from Muar.

Ahmad Najib later married and had two children, both aged between one and two at the time of his sentencing. He had worked as an aircraft cabin cleaner for Malaysia Airlines since 2000, and lived in Pantai Dalam prior to the murder of Canny Ong. According to those who knew him, Ahmad Najib was regarded as a man of good character and was responsible in his work.

== Murder of Canny Ong ==
=== Background of the victim ===
Canny Ong 王丽涓
- Born: Canny Ong Lay Kian; 18 July 1974; Ipoh, Perak, Malaysia
- Died: 14 June 2003 (aged 28); Jalan Klang Lama, Petaling Jaya, Selangor, Malaysia
- Cause of death: Murder by strangulation and stabbing
- Education: Hawaii Pacific University
- Occupation: IT analyst
- Known for: Murder victim
- Spouse: Brandon Ong (王奕天) (m. 2001–2003)
- Parent(s): Ong Bee Jeng (王美钟; father); Pearly Visvanathan (mother)

Canny Ong Lay Kian (Chinese: 王丽涓; pinyin: Wáng Lìjuān) was a Malaysian woman working as an information technology analyst in San Diego, California, United States. She was born on 18 July 1974 to Ong Bee Jeng (Chinese: 王美钟; pinyin: Wáng Meǐzhōng) and Pearly Visvanathan in Ipoh, Perak. Her mother is of Chinese and Indian descent. Ong had a sister named Elsie Ong Lee Cheng (Chinese: 王丽娴; pinyin: Wáng Lìxián). She was described by those who knew her as a dutiful daughter and a considerate person.

Ong moved to the United States to pursue her university studies at Hawaii Pacific University, where she earned a degree in economics. She later moved to Los Angeles to seek employment, where she met her future husband, Brandon Ong (Chinese: 王奕天; pinyin: Wáng Yìtiān). The couple married in 2001. Brandon Ong was born to ethnic Chinese parents who had immigrated from Singapore to the U.S. more than 20 years before Ong's murder. Together, the couple settled in San Diego.

In early 2003, Ong's father, Ong Bee Jeng, was diagnosed with cancer. On 1 June 2003, Ong flew from the United States to Malaysia to visit him. His condition subsequently improved, and Ong was scheduled to return to the United States on 14 June 2003.

=== Kidnapping, rape and murder ===
On 13 June 2003, the day before Canny Ong was due to return to the United States, she went out for a farewell dinner of steak and fried crabs with her family and close friends at Monde Restaurant, Bangsar Shopping Complex (BSC), Bangsar, Kuala Lumpur.

After the meal, seeing that her mother had become tired, Ong offered to drive her mother back home before she continued with the farewell party, Ong returned to their car in the basement to pick up a parking ticket while her mother and sister waited by the Autopay machine. However, Ong never returned, for she was being abducted by Ahmad Najib bin Aris, who was then 27 years old.

After waiting for 20 minutes, Ong's mother and sister became worried. Ong's sister made two calls to her handphone – the first was not answered while the second was converted to voicemail. Together, they both went to the car park and found their car - a purple Proton Tiara (WFN 6871 plate) - missing. After pleading with the security guards, the mother, the elder sister, Ong's friends, together with the security personnel, viewed the CCTV footages and saw Ong being abducted by an unidentified person (Ahmad Najib). More than an hour after the woman's abduction, a police report was made.

On 14 June 2003, at 12.00 am, two plainsclothes policemen patrolling on a motorcycle found a Proton Tiara (Canny Ong's car) and upon approaching it, they saw Ahmad Najib and Canny Ong inside it near Kelana Jaya. Canny Ong was still alive at the time. One of the officers, Lance Corporal Subramaniam Ravichandran, showed his police ID and asked to see the duo's identification cards, which Ahmad Najib and his captive Ong had given upon the officer's request. Ravichandran asked the two to get out, but Ahmad Najib refused to, and even stopped Ong from getting out of the car. According to Ravichandran, the High Court heard in the trial of Ahmad Najib that Ong had made a series of strange hand gestures towards the officer (before Ahmad Najib noticed her), apparently trying to seek help from the officer, but he could not understand the gestures. Ahmad Najib then quickly drove off after he maintained his refusal to alight the car, and the policemen, who still held on to the IDs of Ong and her kidnapper, quickly fired shots at the car and attempted to give chase, but they lost sight of the car. The IDs later became the major clue to identifying the last person with Ong when police obtained the IDs and investigated the murder and rape case.

Another witness, Aminah Isahak, later spotted the Proton Tiara, with Ong (still alive) inside. At that point of time, Ahmad Najib stopped the car along Jalan Sungai Way to replace a car tyre, which was punctured by a bullet (shot by the police officers earlier). Aminah, who was twenty feet away from the car when she waited in her brother-in-law's car. She was approached by Ahmad Najib to borrow a jack to remove the tyre. Aminah said that while Ahmad Najib was struggling with the wheel, she saw Ong pulling odd faces a her, trying to signal for help. Feeling that something is amiss, Aminah copied down the car registration number, which she did just in time when Ahmad Najib drove off again, having given up replacing the car tyre. Together with her brother-in-law, Aminah went to report the incident at Subang Jaya Police Station, and provided the police with the car registration number.

Later, between 1.00 am to 5.00 am, Ahmad Najib raped Canny Ong in the Proton Tiara under a bridge (that was still under construction) near Taman Datuk Harun in Jalan Klang Lama. After that, Ahmad Najib used a knife to stab Canny Ong twice, which killed the 28-year-old IT analyst. Canny Ong's body was pushed into a narrow hole on the side of the highway and overlaid with two large tires containing cement. The car was abandoned at a nearby shop house. The killer then fled in a taxi. After that, the next day, Ahmad Najib bought petrol with a plan to burn the body. He went back to the hole and poured oil and burned the corpse.

Unknown to Ahmad Najib, a van driver, Azizan Ismail, had witnessed him at the construction site in the car with a topless woman (Ong) lying on the back seat, but mistook them as a pair of lovers having sex. He would see the Proton Tiara once again the second time when Ahmad Najib was, unbeknownst to the witness, at a short distance away raping and killing his kidnapped victim. Azizan had also stole Canny Ong's handphone from the car, and sold it; the police initially arrested him and his two friends as a suspect after they traced the handphone to the three of them during investigations, but later released them after Ahmad Najib's arrest. Azizan would become one of the 69 witnesses who came to testify in the murder trial of 27-year-old Ahmad Najib bin Aris.

== Confession and trial ==
=== Discovery of the body and Ahmad Najib's arrest ===
On the Tuesday morning of 17 June 2003, Canny Ong's remains were discovered by a construction site manager. She was found with a cloth around her neck, her hands crossed over her chest and her legs dangling out of the hole. The police, having received reports of Canny Ong's disappearance, arrived at the scene and brought the body for forensic tests. Canny Ong's family was contacted to identify her body. The abandoned Proton Tiara was also discovered by police.

An autopsy revealed that Ong was strangled before her body was set alight. Semen was found on Ong's vagina. Subsequently, following the police investigation of the case, on 20 June 2003, Ahmad Najib was arrested as a suspect, and the DNA tests confirmed that the semen matched Ahmad Najib's. The man also confessed to the police that he had indeed killed Ong, and made a full-length confession of the crime, and even led the police to the various crime scenes related to the rape and murder. Ahmad Najib had also said in his confession that he went to the shopping centre to look for a woman he had a grudge with—his former employer—but had mistaken Ong for the woman, and only realised the mistake when Ravichandran checked the ID.

Ahmad Najib was then formally charged with murder and rape, and media reports of the case brought shock to the whole of Malaysia. Further police investigations also found that Ahmad Najib was linked to and allegedly committed four carpark rape cases, which led to speculations that Ahmad Najib could be a serial rapist. However, the police officers could not formally charge or investigate Ahmad Najib with these cases as the victims, some of them were married, did not want to let people know about their identities as Ahmad Najib's previous rape victims.

Canny Ong's funeral was held at St Francis Xavier Church on 27 June 2003. Over 500 people from the public attended the funeral to offer their condolences, including some politicians. Ong's family and friends were also present at the funeral.

=== High Court murder trial and sentence ===
The trial started on 15 September 2003, merely 3 months after Canny Ong's murder. DPP Salehuddin bin Saidin was the prosecutor in charge of the case, and the defence lawyer representing Ahmad Najib was Mohamed Haniff bin Khatri Abdulla, a notable lawyer in Malaysia. If found guilty of murder, under Section 302 of the Malaysian Penal Code, Ahmad Najib faced the mandatory death penalty.

Despite confessing to the crime, Ahmad Najib pleaded not guilty, claiming that he was forced, tortured and coerced by the police to make the confession. Mohamed Haniff also sought to challenge the validity of the confession. In rebuttal, the magistrate who was present when Ahmad Najib was first charged testified that Ahmad Najib seemed relaxed and had no physical injuries on him, and had voluntarily made the confession, which he accepted at the preliminary hearing (at that time, Ahmad Najib was unrepresented).

After a trial within a trial lasting 10 days, the trial judge, High Court Justice Datuk Muhamad Ideres Muhamad Rapee admitted the confession as evidence. Other than the confession, the forensic evidence and chemist report also linked Ahmad Najib to the crime, especially the clothes he wore at the time of the abduction, which had some traces of Ong's DNA. the fabric cloth which Ahmad Najib used to strangle Ong, was the same type which airplane cleaners would use to wipe the plane windows,. Given the killer's occupation, it further linked Ahmad Najib to the crime. Criminologist and psychiatrist, Dr Geshina Ayu Mat Saat confirmed that Ahmad Najib was not psychotic and could function as usual. He also had good relationships with his family, colleagues and neighbors.

In the defence, Mohamed Haniff sought to prove that Ahmad Najib could not be the killer, and questioned some parts of the prosecution's case. He questioned why Ong did not take a chance to escape the car when Ahmad Najib was busy trying to replace the tyre. Given that she had a black belt in martial arts, he said that it would not be impossible for her to escape Ahmad Najib's clutches. This led some people to speculate why. Some of the experts who were interviewed about the case rebutted the lawyer's claims, saying that it was easier said than done, and no blame should be placed on the victim for her failure to escape. It was, in their opinion, impossible for Ong to escape since she had no idea of where she was and it was 2 am. Another one of the experts, in response to the lawyer's theory, said that imagination and reality are different when it comes to such a situation as Ong was in. The lawyer even brought up a theory that other people could be responsible for the murder and rape. He brought up the finances of Ong's family, and the disappearance of the ring Ong wore at the time of her disappearance. The cement-filled tyres were heavy. The lawyer asked whether it would need much strength to move them. On the stand, the police officer agreed that it would but refused to agree with the lawyer that more than one person could be involved.

Furthermore, Mohamed Haniff sought to undermine the victim's dignity, saying that Ong could have consented to having sex with Ahmad Najib, and the move of which Ahmad Najib tied the cloth around Ong's neck was part of a sexual act performed by couples during masturbation (more commonly by males), and asked if the death could be of an accidental and consensual "sexual asphyxia". When he put this theory to the forensic pathologist Dr Kasinathan Nadesan, he said he could not completely exclude this possibility but he said such sexual acts usually do not occur in a car, not on the road side or wayside, but in places away from the public eye. Dr Kasinathan had earlier testified that death was caused by strangulation and even said that he could not dismiss that the cause of Ong's death was possibly due to the massive bleeding caused by a sharp weapon. The pathologist earlier also testified that the only area not charred by fire was the skin under the ligature tied around Ong's neck, which demonstrated how brutally tight the cloth was tied around the neck. The prosecution, in rebuttal, argued that the defence had not raise a reasonable doubt over the case against Ahmad Najib, and had been relying on bare denials, which should not be a defence. They said the defence's attempts to show that someone else had committed the crime by impersonating Ahmad Najib "did not make any sense".

In August 2004, when the High Court determined that the prosecution had made out a prima facie case against him, Ahmad Najib was called to give his defence. After discussing with his six defence lawyers, he chose to remain silent, much to the shock of the public and the court. Under the law, if a person chooses to remain silent, the judge would have to convict the defendant but do nothing else. However, the lawyer Mohamed Haniff argued that the court should have an option of convicting his client or re-evaluate the evidence and submissions from the prosecution before deciding the verdict. He also said that Ahmad Najib's decision to remain silent was not a move to indicate to the judge that the judge's decision to convict him is correct, and he reiterated that if so, then the right to remain silent is not a legal option under the law. In return, DPP Salehuddin argued that the defence had not rebutted the prosecution's case and did not call any other witnesses to testify on their behalf. It was decreed that in the law, DPP Salehuddin said, if the prosecution's case was left unrebutted, and the accused chose to remain silent, the accused ought to be found guilty of the charges he was tried for in court.

On 23 February 2005, after a trial lasting 52 days, the Shah Alam High Court found Ahmad Najib guilty of murder and rape. The judge said that the evidence against Ahmad Najib was overpowering and the prosecution had proven beyond a reasonable doubt that Ahmad Najib had indeed murdered and raped Canny Ong. Consequently, for murdering Canny Ong, Ahmad Najib was sentenced to death. Additionally, for raping Canny Ong, the High Court judge Muhammad Ideres sentenced Ahmad Najib to 20 years' imprisonment, the maximum sentence under Malaysian law for rape, along with 10 strokes of the cane.

Ahmad Najib told reporters that he accepted the court's decision, but he indicated that he will appeal against the conviction and sentence. The outcome of the trial had also brought some closure to Ong's bereaved loved ones and acquaintances, who were affected by the many unsolicited and baseless conspiracy theories in relation to Ong's death, as prompted by the randomness of the crime.

== Appeals and execution ==
After the High Court sentenced him to death, Ahmad Najib filed an appeal against his conviction and sentence, but on 5 March 2007, the Court of Appeal of Malaysia, composed of judges Abdul Aziz Mohamed, Mohd Ghazali Mohd Yusoff, and Azmel Ma'amor, dismissed the appeal, affirming the conviction and sentence based on the forensic evidence against Ahmad Najib, though they rejected the admissibility of the confession due to possibility of police pressuring Ahmad Najib to confess.

Later on, Ahmad Najib appealed to the Federal Court of Malaysia, which was the highest court of Malaysia, and the appeal was heard before a five-person bench, composed of Chief Judge of Malaya Datuk Arifin Zakaria and four Federal Court Justices, Datuk Nik Hashim Nik Ab Rahman, Datuk S. Augustine Paul, Datuk Hashim Yusoff and Datuk Zulkefli Ahmad Makinuddin, but the Federal Court also rejected his appeal in March 2009, which effectively finalized Ahmad Najib's death sentence and his other sentence of 20 years' imprisonment and 10 strokes of the cane. Ahmad Najib later unsuccessfully appealed for clemency from the Sultan of Selangor.

On 23 September 2016, more than 13 years after the murder of Canny Ong, 40-year-old Ahmad Najib bin Aris was executed by hanging in Kajang Prison. His body was returned to his family and later laid buried at the Sungai Kantan Muslim cemetery in Kajang.

Ahmad Najib's lawyer described him as a "good Muslim" while on death row, and prison officers said that Ahmad Najib had often led other inmates in prayer and taught them about religion. The lawyer added that he was a better person than many people outside, at least during the time of his imprisonment before his execution.

== Aftermath ==
Sometime after the conclusion of the case, a crime documentary was made to re-enact the case of Canny Ong, and also narrates the facts of the case and the court proceedings against Ong's rapist-killer Ahmad Najib. Ong's family, acquaintances, and the police officers and legal representatives associated with the case appeared on-screen to be interviewed.

Liz Porter, a crime writer from Australia, wrote a book titled Crime Scene Asia: When Forensic Evidence Becomes the Silent Witness. The book was all about the real-life murder cases from Asia that were solved through forensic evidence; these recorded cases came from Asian countries like Singapore, Malaysia and Hong Kong etc. The case of Canny Ong was one of the 16 murder cases from Asia which Porter included in her book.

Shopping centres in the Klang Valley introduced guarded women's only parking sections, usually painted in pink, near the entrances for the safety of lone female drivers.

== See also ==
- Capital punishment in Malaysia
- Mona Fandey
- List of solved missing person cases (post-2000)
