= Revision of Sentence of Death and Imprisonment for Natural Life Act 2023 =

Temporary law to review death and life sentences

Revision of Sentence of Death and Imprisonment for Natural Life (Temporary Jurisdiction of the Federal Court) Act 2023

Parliament of Malaysia
- Long title: An Act to provide for the temporary revisionary jurisdiction of the Federal Court to review the sentence of death and imprisonment for natural life imposed on a convicted person following the abolition of the mandatory death penalty and amendment to the relating laws.
- Citation: Act 847
- Territorial extent: Throughout Malaysia
- Passed by: Dewan Rakyat
- Passed: 3 April 2023
- Passed by: Dewan Negara
- Passed: 11 April 2023
- Royal assent: 9 June 2023
- Effective: 12 September 2023 [P.U. (B) 397/2023]

Legislative history

Initiating chamber: Dewan Rakyat
- Bill citation: D.R. 8/2023
- Introduced by: Azalina binti Othman Said - Minister in Prime Minister's Department (Law and Institutional Reforms)
- First reading: 27 March 2023
- Second reading: 3 April 2023
- Third reading: 3 April 2023

Revising chamber: Dewan Negara
- Bill citation: D.R. 8/2023
- Member(s) in charge: Ramkarpal Singh a/l Karpal Singh - Deputy Minister in Prime Minister's Department (Law and Institutional Reforms)
- First reading: 5 April 2023
- Second reading: 11 April 2023
- Third reading: 11 April 2023

Related legislation
- Abolition of Mandatory Death Penalty Act 2023

Keywords
- Capital punishment, Death Penalty, Life imprisonment, Federal Court, Commutation
- Status: In force

Revision of Sentence of Death and Imprisonment for Natural Life (Temporary Jurisdiction of the Federal Court) Act 2023 (Malay: Akta Semakan Hukuman Mati dan Pemenjaraan Sepanjang Hayat (Bidang Kuasa Sementara Mahkamah Persekutuan) 2023) is a Malaysian law enacted by the Parliament of Malaysia to grant temporary jurisdiction on the Federal Court to review the death sentence and natural life imprisonment of convicts following the abolition of mandatory death penalty and natural life imprisonment in Malaysia in 2023.

This Act only applies to convicts who have been sentenced to death or natural life imprisonment, and have exhausted all their appeals before the Abolition of Mandatory Death Penalty Act 2023 came into force on 4 July 2023. For death row inmates or natural life convicts who are still in the midst of appeal on and after 4 July 2023, they will be subjected to the Abolition of Mandatory Death Penalty Act 2023 instead.

Under this Act, the Federal Court can only review the punishment that have been imposed on the applicants, and may not overturn their guilty conviction.

Eligible convicts only have a 90 days window to apply to the Federal Court for a review on their sentence, which started from 12 September 2023 and lasted until 10 December 2023 (but the Federal Court may extend this time limit). Convicts are also only permitted to submit the review application once, in which the decision by the Federal Court will be final, and the convicts is not allowed to apply for a second round of review.

== Background ==
=== Proposal ===
This law was first mooted in 2022 when the proposal to abolish mandatory death penalty in Malaysia was under discussion. On 13 June that year, law minister Wan Junaidi Tuanku Jaafar under the Ismail Sabri's administration revealed that a special tribunal consists of Federal Court and Court of Appeal judges may be set up to review the death sentence of existing death row inmates.

On 11 January 2023, Dewan Rakyat speaker Johari Abdul also similarly suggested for the establishment of a special tribunal that is akin to a Pardons Board to review death sentences of current death row inmates, and the tribunal may consists of former and current judges. However, Wan Junaidi, now former law minister, disagree with Johari's proposal, stating that such tribunal could be seen as holding higher authority than the Federal Court, which is the highest court of the country, therefore possibly violating the Constitution.

On 14 February, deputy law minister Ramkarpal Singh revealed that a temporary law will be enacted to deal with 840 out of 1,320 convicts who were already sentenced to death and had exhausted all appeals. Later on 22 February, Ramkarpal said the new law will allow death row inmates and natural life convicts to file for an application to the Federal Court to review their sentences.

On 23 March, law minister Azalina Othman Said announced that the cabinet has approved the tabling of Revision of Sentence of Death and Imprisonment for Natural Life (Temporary Jurisdiction of the Federal Court) Bill 2023 to the Parliament, along with the Abolition of Mandatory Death Penalty Bill 2023. The temporary law, when come into force, will enable Federal Court to review the death sentence and natural life imprisonment imposed on prisoners who have already exhausted all their appeals before the law came into force.

=== Passage in Parliament and becoming law ===
On 27 March 2023, Abolition of Mandatory Death Penalty Bill 2023 together with Revision of Sentence of Death and Imprisonment for Natural Life (Temporary Jurisdiction of the Federal Court) Bill 2023 were tabled by law minister Azalina Othman to the Dewan Rakyat for their first reading. On 3 April, the second and third reading of these two bills were passed by a voice vote in the Dewan Rakyat. On 5 April, deputy law minister Ramkarpal Singh tabled these two bills to the Dewan Negara, and the bills were later passed by the said upper house on 11 April.

The bill then received royal assent on 9 June and was subsequently gazetted on 16 June. The Act officially came into force on 12 September 2023.

On 11 September, a day prior to the enforcement of the Act, the government announced that death row inmates who could not afford for a lawyer to apply for a review will be eligible for a court-assigned lawyer, while natural life convicts may seeks legal assistance from the National Legal Aid Foundation (YBGK). Priority for review application will be considered on the prisoners' age, health, length of sentence, and other relevant factors. As the Act came into force the following day, a total of 1,020 prisoners who were sentenced to death or natural life imprisonment become eligible for a review.

On 22 September 2023, in a Malaysian Bar circular addressed to YBGK lawyers, it was revealed that the application for review to the Federal Court will be carried out by the Malaysian Prison Department within 3 months after the Act took effect. YBGK lawyers will also provide legal representation for all natural life convicts regardless of their citizenship, of which a one-off fee of RM1,800 will be charged per inmate for filing a review application.

== Legal provisions ==
=== Review on death sentence ===
Section 2(1) of the Act granted Federal Court the temporary power to review a death sentence that has been passed under the Penal Code, Arms Act 1960, Firearms (Increased Penalties) Act 1971, Dangerous Drugs Act 1952 and Kidnapping Act 1961, notwithstanding that:

1. such death sentence have been previously affirmed by the Federal Court itself, or
2. an application for pardon has been rejected.

However, the court may not overturn a death row inmate's guilty conviction under this Act.

At the end of the review, the court can either maintain or replace the death sentence of the applicant, in accordance with the provisions of five aforementioned Acts that have been amended by the Abolition of Mandatory Death Penalty Act 2023.

To apply for a review, any death row inmate can make a written application to the Federal Court within 90 days after this Act become effective. Upon receiving such application, the court shall then commence a review on the inmate's death sentence. The court can also extend the application period beyond 90 days if it consider "there is a good reason for doing so". Death row inmates only have one chance of review on their death sentence under this Act.

=== Review on natural life imprisonment ===
Section 4(1) also granted the Federal Court the temporary power to review the natural life imprisonment of any person who is sentenced to such penalty under any written law in Malaysia, notwithstanding that such person has exhausted all judicial appeals, or that his pardon application has been accepted or rejected. Under this Act, the court can only review the length of the sentence and may not alter the guilty status of the life convicts.

At the conclusion of the review, the Federal Court must replace the natural life sentence with a fixed prison sentence between 30 and 40 years.

Similar to the review for death sentence, all natural life convicts have a 90 days window to apply for a review on their sentence after this Act become effective, and the court may extend this application period if it considers "there is a good reason for doing so". Upon the receipt of such an application, the Federal Court shall then commence a review proceeding on the life convict's sentence. All life convicts only have one chance for review on their sentence under this Act.

== Effects ==
On 14 November 2023, the first set of review cases for capital and natural life convicts was held, in which the Federal Court commuted the death penalty of seven death row inmates to 30 years imprisonment (with two male inmates sentenced to 12 strokes of whipping), and four other natural life convicts' sentence to 30 years imprisonment. All 11 inmates were initially sentenced to death for drug trafficking offences, but four of them successfully reduced their death sentence to natural life imprisonment through a pardon before this Act took effect. Out of the seven death row inmates, five are Malaysians while the other two are Thais. All 11 inmates have been previously incarcerated for 21 to 24 years.

On the same day, law minister Azalina also revealed that 95.8% or 978 out of the 1,020 eligible inmates have applied for a review under this Act. As of 9 November, out of these 978 applications, 871 were from death row inmates, while the remaining 117 were from natural life convicts.

According to deputy law minister Ramkarpal Singh back on 6 November, a total of RM12 million has been allocated by the government on the processing of the review applications and the legal aid services.

On 24 June 2024, law minister Azalina disclosed in Parliament that, as of 31 May 2024, a total of 936 review applications from death row inmates have been received, and 474 of these review proceedings have been completed, of which 19 applicants had their review application rejected and had their death sentence upheld by the Federal Court. Majority of the applicants who failed in their death sentence's review were involved in murder cases that resulted in the death of more than one victim or a child victim.

According to figures disclosed by law minister Azalina on 6 November 2024, between 1 January and 14 October 2024, a total of 814 death row inmates had successfully reduced their death sentence to imprisonment through a review hearing under this Act.

On 24 February 2025, law minister Azalina revealed that a total of 1,056 review applications (death sentence and natural life imprisonment) under this Act have been received as of 31 December last year, and all review proceedings have been completed on 29 October 2024.

Among these 1,056 applications, 936 applications were review on death sentence, while the other 120 applications were review on natural life imprisonment. Within these 936 death row applicants, 860 inmates succeeded in reducing their death sentence to imprisonment under this Act, while 47 death row applicants had their death sentence upheld by the court, and 3 other inmates retracted their applications, bringing the total number of inmates who remained under the death penalty after a review to 50. Additionally, 22 death sentence review applications were administratively cancelled, while 3 death row inmates had died before their review were concluded. Meanwhile, all 120 review applications on natural life imprisonment were allowed by the Federal Court.

According to Ramkarpal Singh on 26 October 2026, all death row inmates convicted of drug trafficking have had their death sentences commuted to imprisonment following the abolition of mandatory death penalty back in 2023.

== See also ==
- Abolition of Mandatory Death Penalty Act 2023
- Capital punishment in Malaysia
- Federal Court of Malaysia
- Human rights in Malaysia
