= Abolition of Mandatory Death Penalty Act 2023 =

Malaysian law to abolish mandatory death penalty

Parliament of Malaysia
- Long title: An Act to amend the Penal Code, the Firearms (Increased Penalties) Act 1971, the Arms Act 1960, the Kidnapping Act 1961, the Dangerous Drugs Act 1952, the Strategic Trade Act 2010 and the Criminal Procedure Code in order to abolish the mandatory death penalty, to vary the sentence relating to imprisonment for natural life and whipping, and to provide for matters connected therewith.
- Citation: Act 846
- Territorial extent: Throughout Malaysia
- Passed by: Dewan Rakyat
- Passed: 3 April 2023
- Passed by: Dewan Negara
- Passed: 11 April 2023
- Royal assent: 9 June 2023
- Effective: 4 July 2023 P.U. (B) 229/2023

Legislative history

Initiating chamber: Dewan Rakyat
- Bill citation: D.R. 7/2023
- Introduced by: Azalina binti Othman Said - Minister in Prime Minister's Department (Law and Institutional Reforms)
- First reading: 27 March 2023
- Second reading: 3 April 2023
- Third reading: 3 April 2023

Revising chamber: Dewan Negara
- Bill citation: D.R. 7/2023
- Member(s) in charge: Ramkarpal Singh a/l Karpal Singh - Deputy Minister in Prime Minister's Department (Law and Institutional Reforms)
- First reading: 5 April 2023
- Second reading: 11 April 2023
- Third reading: 11 April 2023

Amends
- Penal Code [Act 574] Firearms (Increased Penalties) Act 1971 [Act 37] Arms Act 1960 [Act 206] Kidnapping Act 1961 [Act 365] Dangerous Drugs Act 1952 [Act 234] Strategic Trade Act 2010 [Act 708] Criminal Procedure Code [Act 593]

Related legislation
- Revision of Sentence of Death and Imprisonment for Natural Life (Temporary Jurisdiction of the Federal Court) Act 2023

Keywords
- Capital punishment, Death Penalty, Life imprisonment, Caning
- Status: In force

Abolition of Mandatory Death Penalty Act 2023 (Malay: Akta Pemansuhan Hukuman Mati Mandatori 2023) is a Malaysian law enacted by the Parliament of Malaysia to abolish the mandatory death penalty and imprisonment for natural life in Malaysia.

However, the death penalty will still remain as a possible and legal punishment under Malaysia's criminal law and this Act does not equal to total abolition of the death penalty in Malaysia.

Before the commencement of this Act on 4 July 2023, there are a total of 11 criminal offences under Malaysian law that carried the mandatory death penalty such as murder, drug trafficking, acts of terrorism, and waging war against the Yang di-Pertuan Agong. If one is found guilty under one of such criminal offences, the only punishment available to the judge by law is the death penalty. The judge has no other choice but to sentence the accused to death, unless the accused is a pregnant women as defined by the Criminal Procedure Code, or a child as defined by the Child Act 2001.

With the introduction of this Act, the judges can now act in their own discretion to decide to whether sentence one to:

1. Death, or;
2. Imprisonment for a term of 30 to 40 years and not less than 12 strokes of whipping.

— on a case-by-case basis.

This Act also abolished all imprisonment for natural life under Malaysian law and replaced it with imprisonment for a term of not less than 30 years but not more than 40 years.

Under Malaysian criminal laws, "imprisonment for natural life" refers to imprisonment until the natural death of the convicts, while "imprisonment for life", unless otherwise stated, refers to a fixed 30 years imprisonment as defined by the Criminal Justice Act 1953. This Act seeks to abolish "imprisonment for natural life", not "imprisonment for life".

== Background and Timeline ==
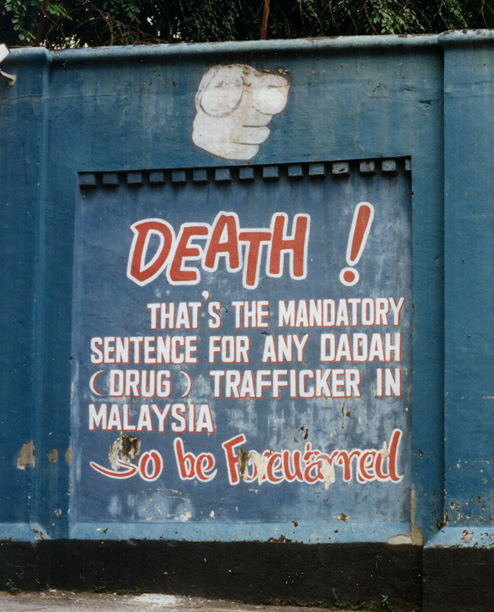
Mural at the now-demolished Pudu Prison, warning about the mandatory death penalty for drug trafficking in Malaysia, 1999.

Before the abolition of mandatory death penalty in Malaysia by this Act, there are a total of 33 criminal offences under nine Malaysian laws that are punishable by death, and among them there are 12 offences that carried the mandatory death penalty.

During the 14th General Election of Malaysia in 2018, Pakatan Harapan, the main opposition coalition at the time, has in its official manifesto promised to abolish "Mandatory death by hanging in all Acts" among a few other Malaysian laws that Pakatan Harapan deem oppressive in nature. Pakatan Harapan eventually defeated the Barisan Nasional government in the general election and resulted in the change of government for the first time in Malaysia's history.

=== During the first Pakatan Harapan government (2018-2020) ===
On 29 June 2018, Deputy Prime Minister Dr Wan Azizah Wan Ismail revealed that the government is looking into the need to make amendments to do away with the mandatory death penalty in legislation pertaining to criminal offences, as this measure would enable Sirul Azhar Umar, who was convicted and sentenced to death over the murder of Mongolian model Altantuya Shaariibuu, to return to Malaysia from Australia if he wanted to.

On 2 July 2018, Deputy Secretary General of the Ministry of Home Affairs, Datuk Seri Nadzri Siron said that the death sentence on 17 inmates in death row had been put on hold pending a government review on capital punishment.

On 7 October 2018, Law Minister Datuk Liew Vui Keong under the newly formed Pakatan Harapan cabinet revealed that a study conducted by the Attorney General's Chamber to abolish mandatory death penalty in Malaysia is in the final stage and will be presented to the cabinet for determination.

==== Total abolition of death penalty proposed and moratorium on execution ====
On 10 October 2018, Law Minister Liew Vui Keong announced to the press that the Cabinet has given the green light for the death penalty to be abolished and the government will abolish death penalty for all crimes.

"All death penalty will be abolished. Full stop." — he told the press.

Liew also said there should be a moratorium in place for execution before the death penalty is formally abolished and the relevant Bill will be tabled in the next Parliament sitting, which would begin on 15 October until 29 Nov.

On the following day, 11 October 2018, Deputy Home Minister Datuk Azis Jamman announced that the government has imposed a nationwide moratorium on all death sentences with immediate effect, and the execution of the 1,278 inmates who are currently on death row will be halted. On the same day, an online poll conducted by Berita Harian, Harian Metro and New Straits Times on Facebook and Twitter following the Law Minister's announcement to abolish all death penalty showed that 82% of Malaysians are against such move by the government. A survey conducted by The Star concluded on 13 October 2024 also showed 45% of Malaysians are against the total abolition of death penalty.

During a speech on 14 October 2018, Liew reveals that the death penalty will be replaced by a minimum 30 years imprisonment instead. He also said existing death sentences will be commuted to minimum 30 years imprisonment instead during the Parliament session on 16 October 2018. On 16 November 2018, Liew also told Al Jazeera that there will be no "U-turn" on death penalty abolition. The proposed Bill however was not tabled in 2018 and was deferred to the next Dewan Rakyat sitting next year. "There has been some slight changes as we need to look into some issues, but I believe everything will be ready by the next sitting,” Law Minister Liew Vui Keong told reporters at the Parliament lobby on 20 December 2018.

On 11 January 2019, during a conference held at Monash University Malaysia, Liew again reiterated he remained a strong supporter of abolishing the death penalty despite his cousin was murdered 40 years ago. On 18 January 2019, Liew said there will be no referendum held on the abolition of death penalty as the matter is still yet to be finalised. On 24 January 2019, families of 30 death row prisoners submitted a memorandum of support on death penalty abolition to Liew at Putrajaya. Liew also said the proposed Bill is expected to be tabled in 2019.

On 9 March 2019, Law Minister Liew Vui Keong however hinted that the death penalty may not be fully abolished and the Cabinet is considering among three options. First option being the total abolition of death penalty for all crimes, while second option involves changing the death penalty for crimes such as murder to be non-mandatory and granting judges the discretion to impose life imprisonment as alternative sentence. The third option however would only abolish the mandatory death penalty for drug trafficking under the Dangerous Drugs Act 1952, and replacing it with life imprisonment of 30 years instead.

==== The "U-turn" ====
On 13 March 2019, Deputy Law Minister Mohamed Hanipa Maidin told the Dewan Rakyat that the government will only repeal the mandatory death penalty for 11 criminal offences, and the death penalty will become optional and imposed at the discretion of the court.

This move was soon accused and criticised by several NGOs and human rights groups as a sudden "U-turn" on the Pakatan Harapan government's stance on total abolition of the death penalty. Human rights groups such as Amnesty International described the announcement as "disappointing", accusing the government as "appears to have bowed to political and public pressure to retain the death penalty". Lawyers for Liberty (LFL) has also criticised the Pakatan Harapan government as succumbing to "moral cowardice" and calling the decision as "shocking, unprincipled and embarrassing". The Malaysian Coalition Against the Death Penalty has also expressed its deep disappointment and claimed that "the death penalty, whether mandatory or not, has no place in today's world". Malaysians Against Death Penalty and Torture (MADPET) was also saddened by the U-turn, and said that the Prime Minister and parliamentarians must have the required political will and courage to "do the right and just" to immediately abolish the death penalty.

On 5 April 2019, Law Minister Liew Vui Keong said that the process to abolish the mandatory death penalty was still ongoing as the government had to deal with various issues related to the imposition of a moratorium against executions. The process is expected to be completed in June and in time for the July sitting of the Dewan Rakyat. On 10 May 2019, after nearly a year in office, Liew conceded that legal reforms such as proposal to abolish mandatory death penalty is still work in progress as the government must consider the views of all stakeholders, given the complexity and sensitivity of the issue.

On 4 July 2019 during the Dewan Rakyat sitting in July 2019, Liew Vui Keong said the studies on the abolishment of mandatory death penalty has been completed and the Bill is expected to be tabled in Parliament next week. However, contrary to his previous statement, the Bill was not tabled in the July sitting and was again deferred to the next sitting in October 2019 (and would deferred again to March 2020). A task force will also be set up to further study the matters, Liew revealed during a press conference on 13 July 2019.

On 29 August 2019, the Cabinet agreed to set up the task force, which would later be called the Special Committee on the Study on the Alternative to the Mandatory Death Sentence. It was headed by the former Chief Justice Tan Sri Richard Malanjum and consists of other eight experts. The special committee was formally established on 20 September 2019 and held its first meeting on the same day. In the next four months, the committee would also held several town halls and public consultations across the country with all segments of society. The study was concluded on 31 January 2020 and a 128-page final report was submitted by the special committee to the government in February 2020.

==== Fall of Pakatan Harapan government ====
The Bill was originally expected to be tabled to the Dewan Rakyat in March 2020, but this would not be materialised as the Pakatan Harapan government would collapsed on 24 February 2020 following Sheraton Move and the resignation of the then-Prime Minister Mahathir Mohamad. Malaysia would also be struck by the COVID-19 pandemic and the country went into lockdown on 18 March 2020. Since its proposal in October 2018, the tabling of the Bill under the Pakatan Harapan government has experienced four deferment, from October 2018 to March 2019, July 2019, October 2019, and finally to March 2020.

=== During Muhyiddin's term (2020-2021) ===
During Muhyiddin Yasin's 17-months term as the 8th Prime Minister from his swearing in on 1 March 2020 until his resignation on 16 August 2021, no Bill relating to abolition of mandatory death penalty was ever tabled in any of the Parliament sitttings held. No real progress was achieved either as the then-Law Minister Takiyuddin Hassan merely on separate occasions told Parliament that the report submitted by the special committee will be presented to the Cabinet for "further consideration" and still "required further scrutiny".

=== During Ismail Sabri's term (2021-2022) ===
In August 2021, Malaysia experienced another round of political turmoil and change of Prime Minister, which resulted in Ismail Sabri Yaakob swearing in as the 9th Prime Minister and the formation of a new Cabinet. On 29 December 2021, the new Law Minister, Wan Junaidi Tuanku Jaafar, said the government will make a decision once the special committee formed two years ago has presented its findings and the findings were expected to be submitted soon. On 28 January 2022, Wan Junaidi in a statement said the special committee's report will be presented to the Cabinet by the end of February and he has been briefed on the report's findings by the committee.

==== Abolition effort revived ====
On 10 June 2022, Law Minister Wan Junaidi in a press statement announced that the government has agreed to abolish mandatory death penalty and replace it with punishment that are meted out at the discretion of the court. The decision was reached following a presentation of the committee's report by him in a Cabinet meeting held on 8 June 2022. The Cabinet has also agreed that further scrutiny and study be conducted on the proposed substitute sentence for 34 criminal offences that carries either mandatory death penalty or discretional death penalty, which will be carried out with the cooperation of Attorney General's Chambers, Legal Affairs Division of the Prime Minister's Department, and other relevant ministries and departments.

Following the release of the press statement, Wan Junaidi further elaborate that the government has yet to set a timeframe for the abolition of the mandatory death penalty to take effect, as many areas still need refining, including the proposal by Attorney General's Chambers to set up a tribunal to study cases already served with the mandatory death sentence. He also told reporters that all current cases with mandatory death sentences that have yet to be decided by the courts will be postponed until the decision takes effect. On the same day, Prime Minister Ismail Sabri Yaakob emphasised that the death penalty will remain and not be abolished entirely, and the change is only on the fact that judges are now given discretion in sentencing. He said only the “mandatory” part will be removed and judges will no longer be bound by the word "mandatory", which had left them with no choice but to impose the death penalty on criminal offenders as provided by law, such as in drug trafficking cases.

On 13 June 2022, Wan Junaidi in a press conference revealed that the recommendation made by the special committee on a new sentencing policy is based on three principles: (1) For offences causing death, the death penalty at the court's discretion will be maintained; (2) for offences not causing death, death penalty should not be imposed by the courts; and (3) if the offender was not sentenced to death, then he can be punished with caning. He also said public feedback is welcomed and a public survey will be conducted on the abolition of mandatory death penalty. He also disclosed that as of June 2022 there're currently 1,342 death row inmates in the country since 2012. Wan Junaidi is hopeful that the Bill will be tabled in Dewan Rakyat for its first reading in October 2022, then Dewan Negara in December 2022, and finally takes effect by January or February 2023.

On 13 September 2022, Wan Junaidi said the government has agreed in principle on the alternative sentences to the mandatory death penalty for 12 offences under the law. A moratorium on the execution of 1,337 death row inmates was also announced. The decision was made after two series of meetings held on 6 September and 13 September by the Substitute Sentences for the Mandatory Death Penalty Task Force Technical Committee which he had chaired. On 20 September 2022, an engagement session with MPs and representatives from Barisan Nasional, Perikatan Nasional, and Pakatan Harapan was held at the Parliament building to discuss the alternative sentences and the moratorium on execution. The engagement session was also attended by senior officers from Home Ministry, AGC, and Prison Department.

==== Tabling of Bills in Parliament ====
On 6 October 2022, the Bills relating to abolition of mandatory death penalty were finally tabled for their first reading in Dewan Rakyat. To abolish the mandatory death penalty under Malaysian law, seven separate Bills were tabled, which are:

1. Criminal Justice (Amendment) Bill 2022
2. Kidnapping (Amendment) Bill 2022
3. Dangerous Drugs (Amendment) Bill 2022
4. Firearms (Increased Penalties) (Amendment) Bill 2022
5. Arms (Amendment) Bill 2022
6. Criminal Procedure Code (Amendment) (No. 3) Bill 2022
7. Penal Code (Amendment) (No. 2) Bill 2022

Under the introduced Bills, other than the abolition of mandatory death penalty, the Criminal Justice Act 1953 will be amended to include the definition for "imprisonment for natural life" and the words "imprisonment for life" under other amended Acts will be changed to "imprisonment for natural life". The death penalty under Kidnapping Act 1961 and Arms Act 1960 will also be removed as an option. Death penalty for kidnapping and attempted murder while under life sentence under the Penal Code will also be entirely abolished. The amendment will also apply retrospectively to all ongoing court cases.

However, four days after its first reading, the Parliament was dissolved on 10 October 2022 to make way for the 15th General Election and these pending Bills were lapsed upon the dissolution of Parliament.

=== During Anwar Ibrahim's Unity Government (2022-2023) ===
After the 15th General Election, a PH-BN unity government was formed with Anwar Ibrahim sworn in as the 10th Prime Minister on 24 November 2022. Azalina Othman Said and Ramkarpal Signh was appointed as the new Law Minister and Deputy Law Minister respectively. On 12 December 2022, during a speech in Human Rights Day Forum 2022 at Royale Chulan Hotel, Azalina briefly mentioned that she will continue the effort of previous administration to abolish the mandatory death penalty.

==== Abolition effort continued ====
On 21 December 2022, Azalina in a statement said, following a reexamination and rediscussion on the proposal for substitute sentences for mandatory death penalty, the Cabinet has agreed to continue the effort of abolishing the mandatory death penalty. She said the Attorney General's Chambers has examined the proposed substitute punishment for 11 offences that carry mandatory death penalty and 23 other offences that carry discretionary death penalty. The moratorium on the execution of death row inmates will continue to be remained in place. Seven Bills introduced by the previous Ismail Sabri's administration will also be retabled again to Parliament in February 2023.

On 10 January 2023, Deputy Law Minister Ramkarpal Singh said the government is studying the suggestions and views given by the special committee, government agencies, civil societies and NGOs regarding the substitute sentences for the mandatory death penalty. On 12 January 2023, Dewan Rakyat Speaker Johari Abdul suggested for a special tribunal to be set up to decide the fate of persons who were already sentenced to death. The tribunal will be akins to Pardons Board but consists of prominent or former judges. However, former Law Minister Wan Junaidi disagree with such proposal, saying such tribunal could be seen as holding higher authority than the Federal Court, which is the highest court of the country, therefore possibly violating the Constitution.

On 14 February 2023, in response to a Parliamentary question, Ramkarpal Singh said the government is considering to enact a new temporary law to handle the cases of convicts who were already sentenced to death, which will directly impact 840 prisoners (64%) out of the 1,320 death row inmates, while the remaining 480 people will go through the appeal process as usual. On 22 February 2023, after attending a dialogue session with death row and life sentence prisoners at Kajang Prison, Ramkarpal Singh said the relevant Bill will be tabled for first reading at Dewan Rakyat in March 2023, then passed in April and gazetted by May. Under the new law, death row inmates and prisoners under natural life sentence will be able to file an application to Federal Court to review their sentences.

On 23 March 2023, Law Minister Azalina Othman told Dewan Negara that the Cabinet has agreed to several new policies relating to abolition of mandatory death penalty in a meeting held on 17 March 2023.

One Bill, which would later be called Abolition of Mandatory Death Penalty Bill 2023, will be tabled to abolish all mandatory death penalty and all natural life imprisonment. Criminal offences that carry mandatory death penalty will be changed to be punishable by either the death penalty, or 30 to 40 years imprisonment in addition to at least 12 strokes of whipping. Death penalty will also be entirely removed for offences that did not result in death, except three offences under Section 121 and 121A of the Penal Code and Section 39B of the Dangerous Drugs Act 1952 in which the death penalty will remained as an option.

A second Bill, later called Revision of Sentence of Death and Imprisonment for Natural Life (Temporary Jurisdiction of the Federal Court) Bill 2023, will also be introduced to allow Federal Court to review the death sentence and natural life imprisonment of prisoners who have already exhausted all their appeals or legal remedies.

==== Passage in Parliament and becoming law ====
On 27 March 2023, the Abolition of Mandatory Death Penalty Bill 2023 was officially tabled for its first reading in Dewan Rakyat by Law Minister Azalina Othman. The Revision of Sentence of Death and Imprisonment for Natural Life (Temporary Jurisdiction of the Federal Court) Bill 2023 was also tabled in Dewan Rakyat on the same day. On 3 April 2023, the second and third reading of the Abolition of Mandatory Death Penalty Bill 2023 was passed by a voice vote in Dewan Rakyat. The Bill was subsequently tabled to Dewan Negara for first reading by the Deputy Law Minister Ramkarpal Singh on 5 April 2023. On 11 April 2023, the second and third reading of the Bill was passed without amendment by Dewan Negara with a voice vote. The Bill received royal assent on 9 June 2023 and was officially gazetted as Abolition of Mandatory Death Penalty Act 2023 (Act 846) on 16 June 2023. On 4 July 2023, the Act officially came into operation.

== Statutory Provision ==
This Act has amended 7 other Malaysian laws that contain mandatory death penalty and imprisonment for natural life, which are namely the Penal Code, Firearms (Increased Penalties) Act 1971, Arms Act 1960, Kidnapping Act 1961, Dangerous Drugs Act 1952, Strategic Trade Act 2010, and Criminal Procedure Code. These amendments also apply retrospectively to all ongoing court cases or appeals. For convicts sentenced to death or natural life imprisonment under the amended sections and have exhausted all their appeals before this Act comes into effect, they would be dealt with under the Revision of Sentence of Death and Imprisonment for Natural Life (Temporary Jurisdiction of the Federal Court) Act 2023 instead.

The 7 aforementioned laws are amended by this Act in the manners as follows:

=== Penal Code ===
Section Amended	Criminal Offence / Section Heading	Before Amendment	After Amendment	Remark
115	Abetment of an offence punishable with death or imprisonment for life	Whoever abets the commission of an offence punishable with death or imprisonment for life or imprisonment for a term which may extend to twenty years, shall, ...	Whoever abets the commission of an offence punishable with death or imprisonment for life or imprisonment for a term which may extend to twenty years or upwards, shall, ...	Consequential amendment to reflect the increase of terms of imprisonment up to 40 years in other parts of the Penal Code
118	Concealing a design to commit an offence punishable with death or imprisonment for life	Whoever, intending to facilitate, or knowing it to be likely that he will thereby facilitate, the commission of an offence punishable with death or imprisonment for life or imprisonment for a term which may extend to twenty years, ...	Whoever, intending to facilitate, or knowing it to be likely that he will thereby facilitate, the commission of an offence punishable with death or imprisonment for life or imprisonment for a term which may extend to twenty years or upwards, ...	Consequential amendment to reflect the increase of terms of imprisonment up to 40 years in other parts of the Penal Code
119	A public servant concealing a design to commit an offence which it is his duty to prevent	... or if the offence is punishable with death or imprisonment for life or imprisonment for a term which may extend to twenty years, with imprisonment for a term which may extend to ten years; ...	... or if the offence is punishable with death or imprisonment for life or imprisonment for a term which may extend to twenty years or upwards, with imprisonment for a term which may extend to ten years; ...	Consequential amendment to reflect the increase of terms of imprisonment up to 40 years in other parts of the Penal Code
121	Waging or attempting to wage war or abetting the waging of war against the Yang di-Pertuan Agong, a Ruler or Yang di-Pertua Negeri	... shall be punished with death or imprisonment for life ...	... shall be punished with death or imprisonment for a term of not less than thirty years but not exceeding forty years ...	Replacing imprisonment for natural life with 30 to 40 years imprisonment
121A	Offences against the person of the Yang di-Pertuan Agong, Ruler or Yang di-Pertua Negeri	... shall be punished with death and shall also be liable to fine.	... shall be punished with death or imprisonment for a term of not less than thirty years but not exceeding forty years and if not sentenced to death, shall also be punished with whipping of not less than twelve strokes.	Replacing mandatory death penalty with either death, or 30 to 40 years imprisonment in addition to at least 12 strokes of whipping Fine abolished
121B	Offences against the authority of the Yang di-Pertuan Agong, Ruler or Yang di-Pertua Negeri	... shall be punished with imprisonment for life ...	... shall be punished with imprisonment for a term of not less than thirty years but not exceeding forty years ...	Replacing imprisonment for natural life with 30 to 40 years imprisonment
122	Collecting arms,etc., with the intention of waging war against the Yang di-Pertuan Agong, a Ruler or Yang di-Pertua Negeri	... shall be punished with imprisonment for life or imprisonment for a term not exceeding twenty years ...	... shall be punished with imprisonment for a term not exceeding forty years ...	Replacing imprisonment for natural life with maximum 40 years imprisonment
124K	Sabotage	... shall be punished with imprisonment for life.	... shall be punished with imprisonment for a term of not less than thirty years but not exceeding forty years.	Replacing imprisonment for natural life with 30 to 40 years imprisonment
124M	Espionage	... shall be punished with imprisonment for life.	... shall be punished with imprisonment for a term of not less than thirty years but not exceeding forty years.	Replacing imprisonment for natural life with 30 to 40 years imprisonment
125	Waging war against any power in alliance with the Yang di-Pertuan Agong	... shall be punished with imprisonment for life, to which fine may be added; or with imprisonment for a term which may extend to twenty years ...	... shall be punished with imprisonment for a term not exceeding forty years ...	Replacing imprisonment for natural life with maximum 40 years imprisonment
125A	Harbouring or attempting to harbour any person in Malaysia or person residing in a foreign State at war or in hostility against the Yang di Pertuan Agong	... shall be punished with imprisonment for life, to which fine may be added; or with imprisonment for a term which may extend to twenty years ...	... shall be punished with imprisonment for a term not exceeding forty years ...	Replacing imprisonment for natural life with maximum 40 years imprisonment
128	Public servant voluntarily allowing prisoner of State or war in his custody to escape	... shall be punished with imprisonment for life, or imprisonment for a term which may extend to twenty years ...	...shall be punished with imprisonment for a term not exceeding forty years ...	Replacing imprisonment for natural life with maximum 40 years imprisonment
130	Aiding escape of, rescuing, or harbouring such prisoner	... shall be punished with imprisonment for life, or with imprisonment for a term which may extend to twenty years ...	... shall be punished with imprisonment for a term not exceeding forty years ...	Replacing imprisonment for natural life with maximum 40 years imprisonment
130A (f)	Interpretation of this Chapter	“imprisonment for life” means (subject to the provisions of any written law conferring power to grant pardons, reprieves or respites or suspension or remission of punishments) imprisonment until the death of the person on whom the sentence is imposed;	[Deleted]	The definition for imprisonment for natural life under Chapter VI is deleted.
130B (1)	Interpretation in relation to this Chapter	“imprisonment for life” means (subject to the provisions of any written law conferring power to grant pardons, reprieves or respites or suspension or remission of punishments) imprisonment until the death of the person on whom the sentence is imposed;	[Deleted]	The definition for imprisonment for natural life under Chapter VIA is deleted.
130C (1)(a)	Committing terrorist acts	... if the act results in death, with death; ...	... if the act results in death, with death or imprisonment for a term of not less than thirty years but not exceeding forty years and if not sentenced to death, shall also be punished with whipping of not less than twelve strokes ...	Replacing mandatory death penalty with either death, or 30 to 40 years imprisonment in addition to at least 12 strokes of whipping
130D	Providing devices to terrorist groups	... shall be punished with imprisonment for life or imprisonment for a term not exceeding thirty years ...	... shall be punished with imprisonment for a term not exceeding forty years ...	Replacing imprisonment for natural life with maximum 40 years imprisonment
130I (a)	Directing activities of terrorist groups	... if the act results in death, with death; ...	... if the act results in death, with death or imprisonment for a term of not less than thirty years but not exceeding forty years, and if not sentenced to death, shall also be punished with whipping of not less than twelve strokes;	Replacing mandatory death penalty with either death, or 30 to 40 years imprisonment in addition to at least 12 strokes of whipping
130J	Soliciting or giving support to terrorist groups or for the commission of terrorist acts	... shall be punished with imprisonment for life or imprisonment for a term not exceeding thirty years ...	... shall be punished with imprisonment for a term not exceeding forty years ...	Replacing imprisonment for natural life with maximum 40 years imprisonment
130K	Harbouring persons committing terrorist acts	... shall be punished with imprisonment for life, and shall also be liable to fine; or with imprisonment for a term which may extend to twenty years ...	... shall be punished with imprisonment for a term not exceeding forty years, and shall also be liable to fine ...	Replacing imprisonment for natural life with maximum 40 years imprisonment
130KA	Member of a terrorist group	... shall be punished with imprisonment which may extend to imprisonment for life ...	... shall be punished with imprisonment which may extend to forty years ...	Replacing imprisonment for natural life with maximum 40 years imprisonment
130N (a)	Providing or collecting property for terrorist acts	... if the act results in death, with death; ...	... if the act results in death, with death or imprisonment for a term of not less than thirty years but not exceeding forty years and if not sentenced to death, shall also be punished with whipping of not less than twelve strokes; ...	Replacing mandatory death penalty with either death, or 30 to 40 years imprisonment in addition to at least 12 strokes of whipping
130O (1)(aa)	Providing services for terrorist purposes	... if the act results in death, with death; ...	... if the act results in death, with death or imprisonment for a term of not less than thirty years but not exceeding forty years and if not sentenced to death, shall also be punished with whipping of not less than twelve strokes; ...	Replacing mandatory death penalty with either death, or 30 to 40 years imprisonment in addition to at least 12 strokes of whipping
130QA	Accepting gratification to facilitate or enable terrorist acts	... if the act results in death, with death; ...	... if the act results in death, with death or imprisonment for a term of not less than thirty years but not exceeding forty years and if not sentenced to death, shall also be punished with whipping of not less than twelve strokes; ...	Replacing mandatory death penalty with either death, or 30 to 40 years imprisonment in addition to at least 12 strokes of whipping
130ZB	Accepting gratification to facilitate or enable organized criminal activity	... if the act results in death, with death; ...	... if the act results in death, with death or imprisonment for a term of not less than thirty years but not exceeding forty years and if not sentenced to death, shall also be punished with whipping of not less than twelve strokes; ...	Replacing mandatory death penalty with either death, or 30 to 40 years imprisonment in addition to at least 12 strokes of whipping
201	Causing disappearance of evidence of an offence committed, or giving false information touching it, to screen the offender	... and if the offence is punishable with imprisonment for life or with imprisonment which may extend to ten years, shall be punished with imprisonment for a term which may extend to three years ...	... and if the offence is punishable with imprisonment for life or with imprisonment which may extend to ten years or upwards, shall be punished with imprisonment for a term which may extend to three years ...	Consequential amendment to reflect the increase of terms of imprisonment up to 40 years in other parts of the Penal Code
212 (1)	Harbouring an offender	... and if the offence is punishable with imprisonment for life or with imprisonment which may extend to ten years, shall be punished with imprisonment for a term which may extend to three years ...	... and if the offence is punishable with imprisonment for life or with imprisonment which may extend to ten years or upwards, shall be punished with imprisonment for a term which may extend to three years ...	Consequential amendment to reflect the increase of terms of imprisonment up to 40 years in other parts of the Penal Code
213	Taking gifts,etc., to screen an offender from punishment	... and if the offence is punishable with imprisonment for life or with imprisonment which may extend to ten years, shall be punished with imprisonment for a term which may extend to three years ...	... and if the offence is punishable with imprisonment for life or with imprisonment which may extend to ten years or upwards, shall be punished with imprisonment for a term which may extend to three years ...	Consequential amendment to reflect the increase of terms of imprisonment up to 40 years in other parts of the Penal Code
214	Offering gift or restoration of property in consideration of screening offender	... and if the offence is punishable with imprisonment for life or with imprisonment which may extend to ten years, shall be punished with imprisonment for a term which may extend to three years ...	... and if the offence is punishable with imprisonment for life or with imprisonment which may extend to ten years or upwards, shall be punished with imprisonment for a term which may extend to three years ...	Consequential amendment to reflect the increase of terms of imprisonment up to 40 years in other parts of the Penal Code
216 (1)	Harbouring an offender who has escaped from custody, or whose apprehension has been ordered	... if the offence is punishable with imprisonment for life, or imprisonment for ten years, he shall be punished with imprisonment for a term which may extend to three years ...	... if the offence is punishable with imprisonment for life, or imprisonment for ten years or upwards, he shall be punished with imprisonment for a term which may extend to three years ...	Consequential amendment to reflect the increase of terms of imprisonment up to 40 years in other parts of the Penal Code
221 (b)	Intentional omission to apprehend on the part of a public servant bound by law to apprehend	... was charged with or liable to be apprehended for an offence punishable with imprisonment for life, or imprisonment for a term which may extend to ten years ...	... was charged with or liable to be apprehended for an offence punishable with imprisonment for life, or imprisonment for a term which may extend to ten years or upwards ...	Consequential amendment to reflect the increase of terms of imprisonment up to 40 years in other parts of the Penal Code
302	Punishment for murder	Whoever commits murder shall be punished with death.	Whoever commits murder shall be punished with death or imprisonment for a term of not less than thirty years but not exceeding forty years and if not sentenced to death, shall also be punished with whipping of not less than twelve strokes.	Replacing mandatory death penalty with either death, or 30 to 40 years imprisonment in addition to at least 12 strokes of whipping
307 (2)	Attempt to murder	When any person offending under this section is under sentence of imprisonment for life or for a term of twenty years, he may, if hurt is caused, be punished with death.	[Deleted]	Attempted murder committed by person under life imprisonment or 20 years imprisonment is no longer punishable with death
364	Kidnapping or abducting in order to murder	... shall be punished with death or imprisonment for a term which may extend to thirty years and shall, if he is not sentenced to death, also be liable to whipping.	... shall be punished with imprisonment for a term of not more than thirty years and shall also be punished with whipping.	Death penalty for this offence is abolished
374A (a)	Hostage-taking	... if the act results in death, with death; ...	... if the act results in death, with death or imprisonment for a term of not less than thirty years but not exceeding forty years and if not sentenced to death, shall also be punished with whipping of not less than twelve strokes; ...	Replacing mandatory death penalty with either death, or 30 to 40 years imprisonment in addition to at least 12 strokes of whipping
450	House-trespass in order to commit an offence punishable with imprisonment for life	Whoever commits house-trespass in order to commit any offence punishable with imprisonment for life or imprisonment for a term which may extend to twenty years, shall ...	Whoever commits house-trespass in order to commit any offence punishable with imprisonment for life or imprisonment for a term which may extend to twenty years or upwards, shall ...	Consequential amendment to reflect the increase of terms of imprisonment up to 40 years in other parts of the Penal Code

=== Firearms (Increased Penalties) Act 1971 ===
Section Amended	Criminal Offence / Section Heading	Before Amendment	After Amendment	Remark
2 (1)	Interpretation	“imprisonment for life” means, notwithstanding section 3 of the Criminal Justice Act 1953 [Act 345] and any other written law to the contrary, imprisonment for the duration of the natural life of the person sentenced;	[Deleted]	The definition for imprisonment for natural life under this Act is deleted
3	Penalty for discharging a firearm in the commission of a scheduled offence	... shall, notwithstanding that no hurt is caused thereby, be punished with death.	... shall, notwithstanding that no hurt is caused thereby, be punished with imprisonment for a term of not less than thirty years but not exceeding forty years and with whipping with not less than twelve strokes.	Replacing mandatory death penalty with 30 to 40 years imprisonment in addition to at least 12 strokes of whipping.
3A	Penalty for accomplices in case of discharge of firearm	... shall, notwithstanding that no hurt is caused by the discharge thereof, be punished with death, ...	... shall, notwithstanding that no hurt is caused by the discharge thereof, be punished with imprisonment for a term of not less than thirty years but not exceeding forty years and with whipping with not less than twelve strokes, ...	Replacing mandatory death penalty with 30 to 40 years imprisonment in addition to at least 12 strokes of whipping.
4	Penalty for exhibiting a firearm in the commission of a scheduled offence	... shall be punished with imprisonment for life and with whipping with not less than six strokes.	... shall be punished with imprisonment for a term of not less than thirty years but not exceeding forty years and with whipping with not less than six strokes.	Replacing imprisonment for natural life with 30 to 40 years imprisonment
5	Penalty for having firearm in the commission of a scheduled offence	... shall be punished with imprisonment for life and with whipping with not less than six strokes.	... shall be punished with imprisonment for a term of not less than thirty years but not exceeding forty years and with whipping with not less than six strokes.	Replacing imprisonment for natural life with 30 to 40 years imprisonment
7 (1)	Penalty for trafficking in firearms	(1) Any person trafficking in firearms shall be punished with — (a) death; or (b) imprisonment for life and with whipping with not less than six strokes.	(1) Any person trafficking in firearms shall be punished with imprisonment for a term of not less than thirty years but not exceeding forty years and with whipping with not less than six strokes.	Death penalty abolished and imprisonment for natural life replaced with 30 to 40 years imprisonment

=== Arms Act 1960 ===
Section Amended	Criminal Offence / Section Heading	Before Amendment	After Amendment	Remark
2	Interpretation	“imprisonment for life” means, notwithstanding section 3 of the Criminal Justice Act 1953 [Act 345] and any other written law to the contrary, imprisonment for the duration of the natural life of the person sentenced;	[Deleted]	The definition for imprisonment for natural life under this Act is deleted
14 (1)	Penalty for manufacturing without licence and for breach of conditions of licence	(1) Any person who manufactures an arm or ammunition — (a) without a valid licence granted under section 12; or (b) in contravention of any condition imposed under paragraph 12(2)(a), shall, on conviction, be liable to punishment with — (i) death; or (ii) imprisonment for life and whipping with not less than six strokes, and, in the case of a company, firm, society or body of persons, with a fine not exceeding five hundred thousand ringgit.	(1) Any person who manufactures an arm or ammunition without a valid licence granted under section 12 or in contravention of any condition imposed under paragraph 12(2)(a) shall, on conviction — (a) be punished with imprisonment for a term of not less than thirty years but not exceeding forty years and with whipping of not less than six strokes; and (b) in the case of a company, firm, society or body of persons, be punished with a fine not exceeding five million ringgit.	Death penalty abolished and imprisonment for natural life replaced with 30 to 40 years imprisonment. Maximum fine increased to five million ringgit.
14 (2)	Penalty for manufacturing without licence and for breach of conditions of licence	... shall, on conviction, be liable to a fine not exceeding twenty-five thousand ringgit, and, in the case of a company, firm, society or body of persons, to a fine not exceeding one hundred thousand ringgit.	... shall, on conviction, be liable to a fine not exceeding two hundred and fifty thousand ringgit, and, in the case of a company, firm, society or body of persons, to a fine not exceeding one million ringgit.	Maximum fine for licensed manufacturer and organization increased to two hundred and fifty thousand ringgit and one million ringgit respectively
34 (1) (a)	Penalty for use and possession of arms and imitation arms in certain cases	... he shall, on conviction, be liable to imprisonment for life or for a term not exceeding fourteen years.	... he shall, on conviction, be liable to imprisonment for a term not exceeding forty years.	Replacing imprisonment for natural life with maximum 40 years imprisonment
46	Jurisdiction of Courts	The Sessions Court Judge shall have power to impose the full penalty or punishment, other than the death penalty, provided by this Act.	[Deleted]	Consequential amendment to reflect the abolition of death penalty under this Act

=== Kidnapping Act 1961 ===
Section Amended	Criminal Offence	Before Amendment	After Amendment	Remark
3 (1)	Abduction, wrongful restraint or wrongful confinement for ransom	... shall be punished on conviction with death or imprisonment for life and shall, if he is not sentenced to death, also be liable to whipping.	... shall be punished on conviction with imprisonment for a term of not less than thirty years but not exceeding forty years and with whipping.	Death penalty abolished and imprisonment for natural life replaced with 30 to 40 years imprisonment

=== Dangerous Drugs Act 1952 ===
Section Amended	Criminal Offence	Before Amendment	After Amendment	Remark
39B (2)	Trafficking in dangerous drugs	... shall be punished on conviction with death or imprisonment for life and shall, if he is not sentenced to death, be punished with whipping of not less than fifteen strokes.	... shall be punished on conviction with death or imprisonment for life and shall, if he is not sentenced to death, be punished with whipping of not less than twelve strokes.	Whipping reduced from at least 15 strokes to at least 12 strokes.
39B (2A)	Trafficking in dangerous drugs	(2A) In exercising the power conferred by subsection (2), the Court in imposing the sentence of imprisonment for life and whipping of not less than fifteen strokes, may have regard only to the following circumstances: (a) there was no evidence of buying and selling of a dangerous drug at the time when the person convicted was arrested; (b) there was no involvement of agent provocateur; or (c) the involvement of the person convicted is restricted to transporting, carrying, sending or delivering a dangerous drug; and (d) that the person convicted has assisted an enforcement agency in disrupting drug trafficking activities within or outside Malaysia.	[Deleted]	Clauses restricting the Court's power to impose imprisonment for life instead of the death penalty were deleted. Before the amendment, if an accused found guilty of trafficking in dangerous drugs does not meet the circumstances set out in subsection (2A), the Court can only sentence him to death. After the amendment, the Court can now freely choose to either sentence the accused to death or imprisonment for life.
39B (2B)	Trafficking in dangerous drugs	(2B) For the purposes of subsection (2A), “enforcement agency” means — (a) the Royal Malaysia Police; (b) the National Anti-Drugs Agency; (c) the Royal Malaysian Customs Department; (d) the Malaysian Maritime Enforcement Agency; or (e) any other enforcement agency as may be determined by the Minister	[Deleted]	Clauses restricting the Court's power to impose imprisonment for life instead of the death penalty were deleted. Before the amendment, if an accused found guilty of trafficking in dangerous drugs does not meet the circumstances set out in subsection (2A), the Court can only sentence him to death. After the amendment, the Court can now freely choose to either sentence the accused to death or imprisonment for life.

=== Strategic Trade Act 2010 ===
Section Amended	Criminal Offence	Before Amendment	After Amendment	Remark
9 (4)(a)(i)(A)	Export, transhipment and transit of strategic items and unlisted items	(A) where death is the result of the act, be punished with death or imprisonment for natural life, ...	(A) where death is the result of the act, be punished with death or imprisonment for a term of not less than thirty years but not exceeding forty years, ...	Replacing imprisonment for natural life with 30 to 40 years imprisonment
9 (5)(a)(i)(A)	Export, transhipment and transit of strategic items and unlisted items	(A) where death is the result of the act, be punished with death or imprisonment for natural life, ...	(A) where death is the result of the act, be punished with death or imprisonment for a term of not less than thirty years but not exceeding forty years, ...	Replacing imprisonment for natural life with 30 to 40 years imprisonment
9 (6)(a)(i)(A)	Export, transhipment and transit of strategic items and unlisted items	(A) where death is the result of the act, be punished with death or imprisonment for natural life, ...	(A) where death is the result of the act, be punished with death or imprisonment for a term of not less than thirty years but not exceeding forty years, ...	Replacing imprisonment for natural life with 30 to 40 years imprisonment
10 (2)(a)	Provision of technical assistance	(a) where death is the result of the act, be punished with death or imprisonment for natural life, ...	(a) where death is the result of the act, be punished with death or imprisonment for a term of not less than thirty years but not exceeding forty years, ...	Replacing imprisonment for natural life with 30 to 40 years imprisonment
11 (2)(a)(i)	Brokering of strategic items	(i) where death is the result of the act, be punished with death or imprisonment for natural life, ...	(i) where death is the result of the act, be punished with death or imprisonment for a term of not less than thirty years but not exceeding forty years, ...	Replacing imprisonment for natural life with 30 to 40 years imprisonment
12 (4)(a)(i)(A)	Transactions involving unlisted items and restricted activities	(A) where death is the result of the act, be punished with death or imprisonment for natural life, ...	(A) where death is the result of the act, be punished with death or imprisonment for a term of not less than thirty years but not exceeding forty years, ...	Replacing imprisonment for natural life with 30 to 40 years imprisonment

=== Criminal Procedure Code ===
Section Amended	Section Heading / Column	Before Amendment	After Amendment	Remark
15 (3)	Arrest, how made	(3) Nothing in this section gives a right to cause the death of a person who is not accused of an offence punishable with death or with imprisonment for life.	(3) Nothing in this section gives a right to cause the death of a person who is not accused of an offence punishable with death or with imprisonment for a term of not less than thirty years but not exceeding forty years or with imprisonment for life.	Consequential amendment to reflect the creation of 30 to 40 years prison term
172D (3)(b)(ii)	Disposal of the case	(ii) an offence for which the punishment provided under the law is imprisonment for natural life;	(ii) an offence for which the punishment provided under the law is imprisonment for a term of not less than thirty years but not exceeding forty years;	Consequential amendment to reflect the abolition of natural life imprisonment
388 (1)	When person accused of non-bailable offence may be released on bail	... if there appears reasonable grounds for believing that he has been guilty of an offence punishable with death or imprisonment for life:	... if there appears reasonable grounds for believing that he has been guilty of an offence punishable with death or imprisonment for life or imprisonment for a term which may extend to forty years:	Consequential amendment to reflect the increase of prison term of up to 40 years in certain parts of Penal Code
425A (2)	Trial in absence of an accused	(c) imprisonment for natural life.	(c) imprisonment for a term of not less than thirty years but not exceeding forty years.	Consequential amendment to reflect the abolition of natural life imprisonment
First Schedule
115	Column 2	Abetment of an offence punishable with death or imprisonment for life, if the offence is not committed in consequence of the abetment	Abetment of an offence punishable with death or imprisonment for life or imprisonment for a term which may extend to twenty years or upwards, if the offence is not committed in consequence of the abetment	Consequential amendment to reflect the creation of 30 to 40 years prison term
118	Column 2	Concealing a design to commit an offence punishable with death or imprisonment for life if the offence is committed	Concealing a design to commit an offence punishable with death or imprisonment for life or imprisonment for a term which may extend to twenty years or upwards if the offence is committed	Consequential amendment to reflect the creation of 30 to 40 years prison term
119	Column 2	If the offence is punishable with death or imprisonment for life	If the offence is punishable with death or imprisonment for life or imprisonment for a term which may extend to twenty years or upwards	Consequential amendment to reflect the creation of 30 to 40 years prison term
121	Column 7	Death; or imprisonment for life, and fine	Death; or imprisonment for a term of not less than thirty years but not exceeding forty years, and fine	Consequential amendment to reflect the abolition of mandatory death penalty and natural life imprisonment
121A	Column 7	Death, and fine	Death, or imprisonment for a term of not less than thirty years but not exceeding forty years	Consequential amendment to reflect the abolition of mandatory death penalty
121B	Column 7	Imprisonment for life, and fine	Imprisonment for a term of not less than thirty years but not exceeding forty years, and fine	Consequential amendment to reflect the abolition of natural life imprisonment
122	Column 7	Imprisonment for life, or imprisonment for twenty years, and fine	Imprisonment for a term not exceeding forty years, and fine	Consequential amendment to reflect the abolition of natural life imprisonment
124K	Column 7	Imprisonment for life	Imprisonment for a term of not less than thirty years but not exceeding forty years	Consequential amendment to reflect the abolition of natural life imprisonment
124M	Column 7	Imprisonment for life	Imprisonment for a term of not less than thirty years but not exceeding forty years	Consequential amendment to reflect the abolition of natural life imprisonment
125	Column 7	Imprisonment for life, and fine; or imprisonment for twenty years and fine; or fine	Imprisonment for a term not exceeding forty years and fine, or fine	Consequential amendment to reflect the abolition of natural life imprisonment
125A	Column 7	Imprisonment for life, and fine; or imprisonment for twenty years and fine; or fine	Imprisonment for a term not exceeding forty years and fine, or fine	Consequential amendment to reflect the abolition of natural life imprisonment
128	Column 7	Imprisonment for life, or imprisonment for twenty years, and fine	Imprisonment for a term not exceeding forty years, and fine	Consequential amendment to reflect the abolition of natural life imprisonment
130	Column 7	Imprisonment for life, or imprisonment for twenty years, and fine	Imprisonment for a term not exceeding forty years, and fine	Consequential amendment to reflect the abolition of natural life imprisonment
130C	Column 7	Death; ...	Death or imprisonment for a term of not less than thirty years but not exceeding forty years, and if not sentenced to death, with whipping of not less than twelve strokes; ...	Consequential amendment to reflect the abolition of mandatory death penalty
130D	Column 7	Imprisonment for life, or imprisonment for thirty years, and fine	Imprisonment for a term not exceeding forty years, and fine	Consequential amendment to reflect the abolition of natural life imprisonment
130I	Column 7	Death; ...	Death or imprisonment for a term of not less than thirty years but not exceeding forty years, and if not sentenced to death, with whipping of not less than twelve strokes; ...	Consequential amendment to reflect the abolition of mandatory death penalty
130J	Column 7	Imprisonment for life, or imprisonment for thirty years; or fine, and forfeiture of certain property	Imprisonment for a term not exceeding forty years; or fine, and forfeiture of certain property	Consequential amendment to reflect the abolition of natural life imprisonment
130K	Column 7	Imprisonment for life, and fine; or imprisonment for twenty years; or fine	Imprisonment for a term not exceeding forty years; or fine	Consequential amendment to reflect the abolition of natural life imprisonment
130KA	Column 7	Imprisonment which may extend to imprisonment for life, and fine	Imprisonment which may extend to forty years, and fine	Consequential amendment to reflect the abolition of natural life imprisonment
130N	Column 7	Death; ...	Death or imprisonment for a term of not less than thirty years but not exceeding forty years, and if not sentenced to death, with whipping of not less than twelve strokes; ...	Consequential amendment to reflect the abolition of mandatory death penalty
130O	Column 7	Death; ...	Death or imprisonment for a term of not less than thirty years but not exceeding forty years, and if not sentenced to death, with whipping of not less than twelve strokes; ...	Consequential amendment to reflect the abolition of mandatory death penalty
130QA	Column 7	If the act results in death, with death, in any other case, imprisonment for not less than seven years but not exceeding thirty years, and fine	Death or imprisonment for a term of not less than thirty years but not exceeding forty years, and if not sentenced to death, with whipping of not less than twelve strokes; or imprisonment for not less than seven years but not exceeding thirty years, and fine	Consequential amendment to reflect the abolition of mandatory death penalty
130ZB	Column 7	If the act results in death, with death, in any other case, imprisonment for not less than seven years but not exceeding thirty years, and fine	Death or imprisonment for a term of not less than thirty years but not exceeding forty years, and if not sentenced to death, with whipping of not less than twelve strokes; or imprisonment for not less than seven years but not exceeding thirty years, and fine	Consequential amendment to reflect the abolition of mandatory death penalty
201	Column 2	If punishable with imprisonment for life or imprisonment for ten years	If punishable with imprisonment for life or imprisonment for ten years or upwards	Consequential amendment to reflect the increase of prison term of up to 40 years in certain parts of Penal Code
212	Column 2	If punishable with imprisonment for life or imprisonment for ten years	If punishable with imprisonment for life or imprisonment for ten years or upwards	Consequential amendment to reflect the increase of prison term of up to 40 years in certain parts of Penal Code
213	Column 2	If punishable with imprisonment for life or imprisonment for ten years	If punishable with imprisonment for life or imprisonment for ten years or upwards	Consequential amendment to reflect the increase of prison term of up to 40 years in certain parts of Penal Code
214	Column 2	If punishable with imprisonment for life or imprisonment for ten years	If punishable with imprisonment for life or imprisonment for ten years or upwards	Consequential amendment to reflect the increase of prison term of up to 40 years in certain parts of Penal Code
216	Column 2	If punishable with imprisonment for life or imprisonment for ten years	If punishable with imprisonment for life or imprisonment for ten years or upwards	Consequential amendment to reflect the increase of prison term of up to 40 years in certain parts of Penal Code
221	Column 2	If punishable with imprisonment for life or imprisonment for ten years	If punishable with imprisonment for life or imprisonment for ten years or upwards	Consequential amendment to reflect the increase of prison term of up to 40 years in certain parts of Penal Code
302	Column 7	Death	Death or imprisonment for a term of not less than thirty years but not exceeding forty years, and if not sentenced to death, with whipping of not less than twelve strokes	Consequential amendment to reflect the abolition of mandatory death penalty
307	The whole row	Attempt by life convict to murder, if hurt is caused	[Deleted]	Consequential amendment to reflect the abolition of death penalty under Section 307 of Penal Code
364	Column 7	Death, or imprisonment for thirty years, and whipping	Imprisonment for a term of not more than thirty years, and whipping	Consequential amendment to reflect the abolition of death penalty under Section 364 of Penal Code
374A	Column 7	Death; ...	Death or imprisonment for a term of not less than thirty years but not exceeding forty years, and if not sentenced to death, with whipping of not less than twelve strokes; ...	Consequential amendment to reflect the abolition of mandatory death penalty
450	Column 2	House trespass in order to the commission of an offence punishable with imprisonment for life	House trespass in order to the commission of an offence punishable with imprisonment for life, imprisonment for twenty years or upwards	Consequential amendment to reflect the increase of prison term of up to 40 years in certain parts of Penal Code

== Reception ==
This Act and the abolishment of mandatory death penalty in Malaysia have received praise from multiple international and local human rights groups, civil society organisation, and NGOs for being a right step forward for human rights in Malaysia. Many of them have also called for Malaysia to completely abolish the death penalty.

=== Amnesty International ===
When a total abolition of death penalty was proposed back in October 2018, Amnesty International praised the decision as a "major step forward" for those who campaigned to end death penalty in Malaysia and calling the announcement "an encouraging sign, but much more needs to be done". However, when the Malaysian government reversed its previous position and only proposed to abolish mandatory death penalty in March 2019, Amnesty International criticised the U-turn as "a watered-down compromise where the government appears to have bowed to political and public pressure to retain the death penalty".

In June 2022 when the abolition effort was revived, Amnesty International applauded it as "a welcome step in the right direction". It call for the necessary amendments to be tabled in Parliament without further delay and also urge the Malaysian government to go further to fully abolish the death penalty. When the Abolition of Mandatory Death Penalty Bill 2023 was tabled to the Parliament in March 2023, it commended Malaysia's resolve to recommence reforms to abolish the mandatory death penalty and call on all members of Dewan Rakyat and Dewan Negara to support the Bill. When the Bill was finally passed by the Dewan Rakyat in April 2023, Amnesty International call it a "historical change" that has laid the foundations for further reform. It also continue to urge Malaysian government to scrap the death penalty once and for all.

=== European Union ===
Following Malaysian government's decision to revive the abolition effort in June 2022, European Union (EU) ambassador to Malaysia, Michalis Rokas, applauded Malaysia's decision as a welcome step towards global abolition of the capital punishment. EU spokesperson for Foreign Affairs and Security Policy, Nabila Massrali, also said the EU is looking forward to swift transformation of this decision into law by the Malaysian government. When the Abolition of the Mandatory Death Penalty Bill 2023 was passed by the Parliament in April 2023, EU again commended Malaysia's move as "an important step towards the complete abolition of capital punishment" and said the EU is "ready to support Malaysia in its efforts to completely abolish the death penalty".

=== Human Rights Watch ===
When the effort to abolish mandatory death penalty was revived under the Ismail Sabri's administration in June 2022, Human Rights Watch's representative, Phil Robertson, commented that it is an important step forward, but he cautioned that the public should adopt a "wait-and-see" approach before actual legislative amendments were put into effect, as "successive Malaysian governments promising much on human rights but ultimately delivering very little", he said.

When the Bill was passed by the Dewan Negara on 11 April 2023, Elaine Pearson, Asia director at Human Rights Watch said its passage brings Malaysia closer to the majority of countries that have eliminated capital punishment altogether. She also said Malaysia's next step should be ending the use of death penalty entirely and commuting the sentences of the 1,300 prisoners sitting on death row.

=== OHCHR ===
On 20 June 2022, UN experts under the Office of the High Commissioner for Human Rights (OHCHR) welcomed Malaysian government's announcement to abolish mandatory death penalty on 10 June 2022. The UN experts claim the mandatory use of the death penalty constitutes "an arbitrary deprivation of life and is a fundamental infringement upon the independence of judiciary and fair trial guarantees". They also said if the reforms were passed into law, it will further bolster the global trend towards universal abolition, and contribute to the enhancement and development of human rights.

Following the passage of the Bill by both Houses of Parliament in April 2023, UN human rights experts again hailed Malaysian government's decision to repeal the mandatory death penalty. The UN experts said with this decision, Malaysia sends a strong signal supporting the abolition of the death penalty in "a region where capital punishment is too often imposed for a broad range of crimes such as drug related offenses".

=== Malaysian Bar ===
When a total abolition of death penalty was first proposed back in October 2018 by the then-Law Minister Liew Vui Keong, Malaysian Bar in a statement said they "wholeheartedly" welcome the announcement. The Bar's president claims the death penalty "does not assure a safe and secure society, but diminishes our collective humanity".

In June 2022 when the then-Law Minister Wan Junaidi under the Ismail Sabri's administration renew the pledge to abolish mandatory death penalty, Malaysian Bar again welcomed the decision and agreed that the sentencing powers should always remain within the unfettered domain of the judiciary. They also called for the government to introduce the amending legislation without further delay, as "any further delay will mean more people being sentenced to die", said Karen Cheah Yee Lynn, the president of Malaysian Bar.

Following Law Minister Azalina Othman's announcement on continuing the abolition of mandatory death penalty in December 2022, Cheah again commended the announcement. She also urged the government to work with Pardons Board to ensure that more than 1,300 death row inmates are spared the death penalty, as it is "an inhumane way" of treating the death row inmates by letting them linger in prison uncertain of their fate.

=== SUHAKAM ===
The Human Rights Commission of Malaysia (SUHAKAM) has expressed their welcome on the moratorium on death penalty issued in 2018, but was disappointed when the government announced in March 2019 that only the mandatory death penalty will be abolished. SUHAKAM's chairman describes the decision as a good first step, but he still is of the view that "a discretionary death penalty is still a barrier to upholding human dignity and the right to life". SUHAKAM has also expressed their welcome following Malaysia's vote in favour a UN General Assembly's resolution on moratorium on death penalty in November 2020. SUHAKAM has also repeatedly urged the government to release the special committee's report and their recommendations to the public in 2020 and 2021. When the Bill was finally passed by the Dewan Rakyat on 3 April 2023, SUHAKAM expressed their welcome on the news and believe it is a positive step towards the ratification of the United Nation Convention Against Torture (UNCAT).

=== SUARAM ===
Malaysian human rights group, Suara Rakyat Malaysia (SUARAM) has expressed their welcome following Liew's announcement on 10 October 2018 which the government decided to completely abolish the death penalty in Malaysia, describing it as a turning point in Malaysia's criminal justice system. When Wan Junaidi announced the government will continue the abolition of mandatory death penalty in June 2022, the group applauds Malaysian government's decision as a "historic move" but insists the death penalty should be totally abolished.

=== ADPAN ===
In June 2022, Anti-Death Penalty Asia Network (ADPAN), an Asia-Pacific anti-death penalty group, has commended the Malaysian government's renewed pledge to abolish mandatory death penalty. The group claimed that the mandatory death penalty does not provide justice as it deprives judges of the discretion to sentence based on the situation of each individual offender. When the then-Law Minister Wan Junaidi under the Ismail Sabri's administration announced the government has finalised its policy decision on alternative sentences for the mandatory death penalty, ADPAN again expressed their praise over the news, calling it "a step towards justice". The group again welcomed the government's move to finally table the Bill to the Parliament in March 2023, calling it "a good step forward" and "represents a progressive step towards significant reform of the criminal justice system".

=== MADPET ===
Malaysians Against Death Penalty and Torture (MADPET) expressed their welcome when it was announced in October 2018 that the death penalty will be totally abolished. The group also called on the opposition MPs and Senators to support the abolition effort of the government. When the first Pakatan Harapan government reversed their stance in March 2019 and decided only to abolish the mandatory death, the group were saddened and disappointed over the news. The group said the Prime Minister and MPs must have the required political will and courage to immediately abolish the death penalty. When a special committee was announced in September 2019, MADPET deemed it as an attempt by the PH government to further delay the abolition effort, which the group fear will "greatly prejudice" accused charged with mandatory death penalty offences.

After seven Bills were tabled to the Parliament by the Ismail Sabri's administration in early October 2022, the group then urged the government to hasten up the passing of the Bills due to the impending rumours of early dissolution of Parliament to make way for the 15th General Election. MADPET expressed their delight when the Bill was tabled and passed by both Houses of Parliament under Anwar Ibrahim's administration in April 2023. The group also celebrated the news when this Act officially became law on 4 July 2023, and continue to reiterate their call for Malaysia to totally abolsihed the death penalty.

=== Lawyers for Liberty ===
When the then-Law Minister Liew Vui Keong in October 2018 announced that Malaysia would abolish the death penalty entirely, Lawyers for Liberty (LFL) described the decision as an "absolutely good", and expressed their strong support for it as they consider the death penalty as "barbarous, and unimaginably cruel". LFL however on 4 December 2018 expressed their concern and questioned the PH government on why the relevant Bill is still yet to be tabled to the Parliament, as the parliamentary session is about to end by next week. In March 2019, when it was announced that only mandatory death penalty will be abolished, LFF strongly criticised the PH government for being succumbing to "moral cowardice" and calling the decision as "shocking, unprincipled and embarrassing".

Following Wan Junaidi's announcement in June 2022 to continue the abolition of mandatory death penalty, LFL applauded the government for its move, claiming that it was "the right thing to do". LFL's adviser, N Surendran also said that "Our society must not stop until capital punishment is thrown into the rubbish heap of history". After the two Bills tabled under the Anwar's administration were finally passed by the Parliament in April 2023, LFL said that while the move is welcomed, the proposed alternative punishment to death penalty such as whipping is “equally barbaric”, therefore nullify the goal of restorative justice and proportionality, the very reason those Bills were tabled.

== See also ==
- Capital punishment in Malaysia
- Caning in Malaysia
- Dangerous Drugs Act 1952
- Human rights in Malaysia
- Penal Code
- Revision of Sentence of Death and Imprisonment for Natural Life (Temporary Jurisdiction of the Federal Court) Act 2023
