= Killing of Ong Teik Kwong =

Shooting in Malaysia

Shooting of Datuk Ong Teik Kwong
- Date: 1 December 2016
- Time: About 19:30 MYT (11:30 UTC)
- Location: Tun Dr Lim Chong Eu Expressway, Penang, Malaysia
- Deaths: 3 deaths; Ong Teik Kwong, Choi Hon Ming, M. Senthil
- Injuries: 4 injured; Muhamad Amirul Amin Amir, Nurul Huda Abdul Aziz, Arivarni Krishnann, Lee Hong Boon
- Arrests: Ong's personal bodyguard, Ja'afar Halid and Lim Boon Leng
- Convicted: Ja'afar Halid
- Convictions: Murder (3 counts); Attempted murder (5 counts); Causing hurt with a weapon
- Sentence: Death (2020) Declared legally insane, discharged and acquitted (2023) 35 years imprisonment and 24 strokes of whipping (2024)

The killing of Datuk Ong Teik Kwong occurred on 1 December 2016, on Tun Dr Lim Chong Eu Expressway, Penang, Malaysia. Datuk Ong, a 32 year old businessman, was driving his car to Penang with his bodyguard and a passenger. The bodyguard, Ja'afar Halid, pulled out his gun and shot and killed Ong. Ja'afar Halid's subsequent shooting also accidentally hit seven people at the scene, resulting in two more deaths and four injured.

== Background ==
Datuk Ong Teik Kwong was a 32 year old businessman and was the chairman of Persatuan Kebajikan Amal CK One. Police also identified Datuk Ong as the deputy leader of Gang 24 in Penang. Datuk Ong's bodyguard, Ja'afar Halid who was believed to be mentally unstable, was on his first day at work when the shooting happened.

== Shooting ==
At about 19:30 MYT (11:30 UTC), on route to Penang in a car, Ong and his business partner, Lim Boon Leng were seated at the front while Ja'afar Halid was seated behind. Ja'afar Halid had an argument with Ong and subsequently shot Ong in the head from behind. The car Ong was driving crashed into several vehicles in front. As the car stopped, Lim Boon Leng panicked as the bodyguard then targeted him and ran out of the car with Ja'afar Halid chasing. Ja'afar Halid shot at Lim multiple times. All the 17 shots missed Lim, but resulted in two other deaths and four people injured. Later, Lim managed to get a ride from a female driver who dropped him at a petrol kiosk. Lim then called his friend to send him to the Penang hospital.

=== Casualties ===
A 28 year old RTM cameraman, Muhamad Amirul Amin Amir, was shot in the chest and was sent to the hospital immediately. Another victim was a 38 year old TNB assistant manager, Nurul Huda Abdul Aziz, 33 year old doctor, Arivarni Krishnann, a 32 year old banker, Poh Bee Joo, and a 56 year old factory worker, Lee Hong Boon. The dead were identified as Choi Hon Ming, a 32 year old children's entertainer, and Senthil Murugaiah, a 38 year old florist.

== Aftermath ==
=== Arrests and investigation ===
Ja'afar Halid was arrested at the scene and Lim was later detained. The Malaysian police carried out investigation under Section 302 of the Malaysia Penal Code for murder. Halid and Lim were remanded a total of seven days to facilitate investigations. Police closed parts of Dr Lim Chong Eu Expressway for the forensics team to carry out investigations on 7 December 2016 between 10:30 and 17:00.

=== Charges and convictions ===
Ja'afar Halid faced three charges for murder, five attempted murders and causing hurt with a weapon. Ja'afar Halid was charged under Section 302 of the Malaysian Penal, Section 307 which is an attempt to murder and Section 324 which is voluntarily causing hurt with a weapon. Judge of the Sessions Court, Honorable Roslan Hamid, advised Halid to engage counsel through the National Legal Aid Foundation as Ja'afar Halid could not afford one. Ja'afar Halid denied trying to kill the bystanders and injuring Lim Boon Leng.

On 16 December 2020, Ja'afar Halid was sentenced to death after being found guilty for the murder of Datuk Ong Teik Kwong, Choi Hon Ming, and Senthil Murugaiah. He was also sentenced to 15 years imprisonment for attempted murder of 5 other persons.

On 20 November 2023, the Court of Appeal found Ja'afar Halid to be legally insane and therefore he was discharged and acquitted under Section 84 of the Penal Code and Section 347 of the Criminal Procedure Code, and was ordered to be held at a mental hospital at the pleasure of Yang di-Pertuan Agong.

On 7 November 2024, the Federal Court reinstated all charges and convictions against Ja'afar Halid after allowing the prosecution's appeal and determined that the accused was of sound mind when he committed the murder. The Federal Court did not sentence him to death (the mandatory death penalty for murder was abolished in 2023), but instead sentenced him to 35 years imprisonment and 24 strokes of whipping, the maximum amount of strokes allowed by the Criminal Procedure Code. The 15 years jail term for five counts of attempted murder was also reinstated, which will run concurrently together with his 35 years jail term for murder.
