= Cannabis in Malaysia =

- Location of Malaysia (dark green)
- Medicinal: Subjected to ministrial approval
- Recreational: Illegal

Cannabis is illegal in Malaysia, although there are talks to make exceptions for medical purposes. Recreational use of cannabis is illegal under Malaysian laws, while the use of cannabis for medical, experimental, educational and research purposes are subjected to the authorization of Minister of Health, and may only be carried out by a public officer.

Under the Dangerous Drugs Act 1952, persons found with illegal possession of 200 grams of marijuana or more are presumed to be trafficking in drugs, and may either be sentenced to death or life imprisonment in addition to at least 12 strokes of caning. For illegal possession of 50 grams or more, the punishment is either life imprisonment or minimum 5 years jail term and 10 strokes of whipping, while illegal possession below 50 grams to 20 grams, may be punished with 2 to 5 years of imprisonment in addition to 3 to 9 strokes of caning

Before the abolition of mandatory death penalty in 2023, the only punishment for trafficking in cannabis (and drugs trafficking in general) in Malaysia is death.

== History ==
Following the British acquisition of Dutch Malacca, by 1826 the British were raising taxes from the production of bhang.

Cannabis restrictions in Malaysia date as far back as the Dangerous Drugs Ordinance 1952 in British Malaya prior to its independence in 1957.

== Legislation ==
The main legislation governing the possession and use of cannabis in Malaysia is the Dangerous Drugs Act 1952 (DDA). Illegal possession and consumption of cannabis, whether in raw or processed form, is a punishable offence under the said Act.

The penalty for illegal possession below 20 grams of cannabis is maximum five years imprisonment or a fine of up to RM20,000, or both. For possession of 20 to 50 grams of cannabis, the penalty will be 2 to 5 years of imprisonment and 3 to 9 strokes of whipping. For possession above 50 grams but below 200 grams, the penalty is either life imprisonment or minimum 5 years jail term in addition to 10 strokes of whipping.

If the amount of cannabis is 200 grams or more, then the person illegally possessing the cannabis is presumed under Section 37(da) of the Act as trafficking in dangerous drugs, for which he may be sentenced to either death, or life imprisonment in addition to at least 12 strokes of whipping under Section 39B. Before the 2017 amendment and the abolition of mandatory death penalty in 2023, the only punishment prescribed under Section 39B is the death penalty.

The use of cannabis for medical, experimental, educational and research purposes in Malaysia is only permissible when an authorization by the Minister of Health is granted and such use is carried out by a public officer. However, such authorization is rarely granted. Recreational use and consumption of cannabis is prohibited and a criminal offence punishable under the DDA.

== Reform ==
In 2018, public outrage over a death penalty handed to a 29-year-old man led Malaysia to discuss legalising cannabis for medical use, which could make them one of the first nations in Asia to do so. The previous Malaysian cabinet also discussed the medicinal value of marijuana in a September 2018 meeting and started early and informal talks on amending the relevant laws. However, as of 2021, such plans never materialised, and Malaysia since had a change of government under unrelated circumstances.

During the debate session for 12th Malaysia Plan, Syed Saddiq proposed a review for use of medical marijuana. He cites the possibility of using it as alternative medical treatment for youths suffering mental health issues, while noting the expected growth of this industry to over RM400 billion in next 4 years from current annual grosses of RM60 billion.

== Research ==
In September 2021, UniMAP became the first ever public university to be allowed to conduct research on hemp cultivation, which a 0.8 hectares of land at Institute of Sustainable Agrotechnology (INSAT) in Sungai Chuchuh, Padang Besar will be used to conduct the research. This research is conducted with the collaboration with a Kuala Lumpur-based company called MyUS Hemphouse Sdn Bhd.
