= Scheduled offence =

Scheduled offence may refer to:

- An offence listed in a schedule to a statute indicating that the statute's provisions apply to such offences:
  - Anti-Terrorism (Amendment) Ordinance, 1999, Pakistan—scheduled offences are considered terrorist acts
  - Arms Offences Act, Singapore—scheduled offences are liable to the death penalty
  - Firearms (Increased Penalties) Act 1971, Malaysia—scheduled offences are liable to the death penalty
  - Prevention of Money Laundering Act, 2002, India—dealing with the proceeds of crime of scheduled offences
  - Terrorism Act 2000, United Kingdom—scheduled offences may have juryless trials
- In particular, an offence which is tried in a special court instead of the ordinary criminal courts:
  - Diplock court—Northern Ireland, 1973–2007
  - Special Criminal Court—Republic of Ireland 1939–1946, 1961–62, and since 1972

== See also ==
- Criminal procedure in South Africa, offences on different schedules are processed differently
