= Criminal Justice Act 1953 =

Federal Legislative Council
- Long title: An Act relating to penal servitude, methods of imprisonment and whipping; and for purposes connected therewith.
- Citation: Act 345
- Territorial extent: Throughout Malaysia
- Enacted: 1953 (F.M Ord. No. 14 of 1953); Revised: 1988 (Act 345 w.e.f. 6 October 1988)
- Assented to: 25 April 1953 (Malay Rulers); 27 April 1953 (High Commissioner for Malaya)
- Effective: Peninsular Malaysia—30 April 1953; Sabah and Sarawak—8 November 1991, P.U. (A) 407/1991; Federal Territory of Labuan—8 November 1991, P.U. (A) 408/1991

Amended by
- Modification of Laws (Criminal Justice Act) (Extension to the States of Sabah and Sarawak) Order 1991 [P.U. (A) 407/1991] Modification of Laws (Criminal Justice Act) (Extension to the Federal Territory of Labuan) Order 1991 [P.U. (A) 408/1991] Criminal Justice (Amendment) Act 2007 [Act A1302]

Keywords
- Criminal justice, penal servitude, cat o' nine tails
- Status: In force

The Criminal Justice Act 1953 (Malay: Akta Keadilan Jenayah 1953), previously called the Criminal Justice Ordinance 1953, is a Malaysian law which enacted relating to penal servitude, methods of imprisonment and whipping; and for purposes connected therewith.

Section 3 provides that a sentence of imprisonment for life is deemed as 30 years imprisonment. Previously, a life sentence was deemed to be 20 years until the Act was amended by the Criminal Justice (Amendment) Act 2007. However, there are some Acts (e.g. Firearms (Increased Penalties) Act 1971) that provides for the imprisonment for the duration of the natural life of the person sentenced, notwithstanding Section 3 of the Criminal Justice Act 1953.

== Structure ==
The Criminal Justice Act 1953, in its current form (1 June 2013), consists of 6 sections and no schedule (including 3 amendments), without separate Part.

- Section 1: Short title and application
- Section 2: Abolition of penal servitude, rigorous and simple imprisonment
- Section 3: Life sentences
- Section 4: Abolition of whipping with cat-o’-nine tails, etc.
- Section 5: (Omitted)
- Section 6: (Omitted)

== See also ==
- Criminal Justice Act
