= Arms Act 1960 =

Gun law in Malaysia

Parliament of the Federation of Malaya
- Long title: An Act relating to arms, imitation arms and ammunition.
- Citation: Act 206
- Territorial extent: Malaysia
- Passed by: Dewan Rakyat
- Passed: 23 June 1960
- Passed by: Dewan Negara
- Passed: 6 July 1960
- Commenced: Peninsular Malaysia — 1 March 1962 [L.N. 63/1962] Sabah and Sarawak — 1 September 1977 [P.U.(A) 260/1977]

Legislative history

Initiating chamber: Dewan Rakyat
- Bill title: Arms Bill
- Bill citation: D.R.19/1960
- Introduced by: Abdul Razak Hussein, Minister of Defence
- First reading: 22 February 1960
- Second reading: 23 June 1960
- Third reading: 23 June 1960

Revising chamber: Dewan Negara
- Bill title: Arms Bill
- Bill citation: D.R.19/1960
- Member(s) in charge: Abdul Razak Hussein, Minister of Defence
- First reading: 29 June 1960
- Second reading: 6 July 1960
- Third reading: 6 July 1960

Repeals
- The Arms Enactment [F.M.S. Cap. 199] The Arms Enactment [Johore En. 64] Enactment No. 7 (Arms) [Kedah En. 6/1342] The Arms and Explosives Enactment 1938 [Kelantan En. 4/1938] The Firearms Enactment 1336 [Perlis En. 14/1336] The Arms Enactment 1356 [Terengganu En. 46/1356] The Arms and Explosives Ordinance [S.S. Cap. 196] The Firearms and Ammunition (Unlawful Possession) Ordinance 1946 [No. 28/1946] The Carrying of Arms Ordinance 1947 [No. 42/1947] The Firearms and Explosives Ordinance [Sabah No. 17/1956] The Arms and Explosives Ordinance [Sarawak Cap. 135]

Amended by
- Arms Licensing Regulations 1961 [L.N. 186/1961] Arms Licensing (Amendment) Regulations 1962 [L.N. 34/1962] Arms (Amendment) Act 1962 [Act 7/1962] Police Act 1967 [Act 344] Customs Act 1967 [Act 235] Arms (Amendment) Act 1968 [Act 34/1968] Arms (Amendment) Act 1974 [Act A266] Arms (Amendment) Act 1975 [Act A316] Malaysian Currency (Ringgit) Act 1975 [Act 160] Modification of Laws (Criminal Procedure) (Sabah and Sarawak) Order 1976 [P.U.(A) 97/1976] Arms (Fees) Regulations 1977 [P.U.(A) 219/1977] Arms and Explosives (Extension) Order 1977 [P.U.(A) 260/1977] Subordinate Courts (Amendment) Act 1978 [Act A434] Arms (Fees) Regulations 1978 [P.U.(A) 242/1978] Subordinate Courts Act (Extension) Order 1980 [P.U.(A) 357/1980] Arms (Amendment of Second Schedule) Regulations 1989 [P.U.(A) 93/1989] Arms Licensing (Amendment of Second Schedule) Regulations 1992 [P.U.(A) 19/1992] Arms (Amendment of Second Schedule) Regulations 2016 [P.U.(A) 360/2016] Arms (Amendment of Second Schedule) Regulations 2017 [P.U.(A) 41/2017] Arms (Amendment of Second Schedule) Regulations 2019 [P.U.(A) 322/2019] Abolition of Mandatory Death Penalty Act 2023 [Act 846]

Keywords
- Ammunition, Arms trafficking, Firearms, Firearms license, Gun control, Gun serial number, Gun shop
- Status: In force

Arms Act 1960 (Malay: Akta Senjata 1960) is the main legislation that governs the licensing, dealing, manufacturing and ownership of firearms and ammunition in Malaysia.

== Legal provisions ==
=== Definitions ===
Under section 2 of the Act, the term "arm" is defined as any lethal barrel weapon that is capable of discharging any shot, bullet, missile, noxious liquid, gas or other things. This includes air gun, air pistol, automatic gun, pistol, or any components that form parts of the firearm, which also includes silencer and flash suppressor.

Meanwhile, the term "ammunition" is defined as ammunition or blank ammunition that can be used for any kind of firearms as described above, and includes any bomb, grenade, or other similar missile. Ammunition that contains noxious liquid, gas or other things also fell within the definition of ammunition.

Under the same section, "imitation arm" is also defined as anything that has the appearance or intended to give the impression of being a real firearm, whether such imitation firearm is capable of discharging anything or not. Airsoft gun and gel blaster fall under this definition, and unlicensed owners or dealers are often the target of police raid.

=== Licensing ===
Under section 3, no person can possess, carry or use any firearms or ammunition unless he has a valid license or permit issued by the Chief Police Officer of the state he resided in. In order to be granted firearms license or permit, applicant must shown he has a "very good reason" to own a firearm, and that the police is in the opinion that the granting of such license or permit would be "without danger to the public safety and the public interest". Additionally, one must be at least 18 years old in order to be qualified for a firearm license.

Firearms licenses are typically granted on the grounds of self defence, hunting and sport shooting. The license is only valid for one year and must be renewed annually.

Under section 5, automatic weapons of any kind; firearms and ammunition capable of discharging noxious liquid, gas or other things; and grenades, bombs, or similar devices are prohibited from being granted license, thereby rendering only single-shot and semi-automatic firearms licensable for civilian use in Malaysia.

== See also ==
- Firearms (Increased Penalties) Act 1971
- Overview of gun laws by nation
