= Malaysians Against Death Penalty & Torture =

Malaysians Against Death Penalty & Torture (MADPET) is a movement for the abolition of the death penalty and torture. MADPET has been involved in many other human rights causes including fighting for freedom of expression, right to privacy, right to a fair trial and against the abuse of power police and other law enforcement officials. MADPET is for the promotion of human rights, human freedoms and justice in Malaysia and around the world. The founding coordinators of MADPET are Charles Hector, N. Surendran and Salbiah Ahmad. Other persons involved in MADPET are Francis Pereira and Shan.

MADPET works much with other groups for the promotion of human rights and justice. MADPET also is a founding member of ADPAN (Anti-Death Penalty Asia Network)

== Abolition of Death Penalty in Malaysia ==
MADPET was instrumental in starting the campaign for the abolition of the death penalty, which led to the Malaysian Bar resolution in 2006 and the Bar remains committed to abolition, and today is a call that has been adopted by SUHAKAM (Malaysian National Human Rights Commission), civil society groups, trade unions and others.

In 2023, Malaysia abolished the mandatory death penalty, which means that judges now have the option to sentence the convicted to a sentence other than death. This happened when the Abolition Of Mandatory Death Penalty Act 2023 came into force on 4/7/2023. Note that death penalty still exist for all these offenses that previously carried the mandatory death penalty, and MADPET continues to campaign for total abolition of the death penalty.

PM and cabinet must have courage to totally abolish death penalty-Malaysiakini, 15/3/2019

MADPET: Enact and enforce laws repealing mandatory death penalty before Malaysian Parliament is dissolved - TOC, 9/10/2022

NGO lauds govt for adopting anti-death penalty resolution at UN assembly-Malaysiakini, 19/12/2022

Malaysia voted in UN to abolish the death penalty; walk the talk now – Madpet - ALIRAN, 20/12/2022

Madpet calls for bills to abolish mandatory death penalty to take effect quickly - Aliran, 14/4/2023

== Death in Custody ==
MADPET has been actively campaigning alone, and with others towards the end of death in especially police custody

There were 430 custodial deaths in Malaysia between 2011 and 2021, a study by the Enforcement Agency Integrity Commission (EAIC) found in 2024. - NST 5/4/2024

== Abolition of Detention Without Trial and Draconian Laws ==
Malaysia, after much protest, abolished the Internal Security Act (ISA). But subsequent amendments and the enactment of a new law leaves behind more detention without trial (DWT) laws, such as the Prevention Of Crime Act 1959 (Poca), Prevention Of Terrorism Act 2015 (Pota) and the Dangerous Drugs (Special Preventive Measures) Act 1985.

In March 2022, a Crime Prevention Board member under the Home Ministry revealed that from April 2014 until March 10 2022, action had been taken against 10,012 individuals using Poca.

A total of 2,673 individuals were placed under the detention order, another 6,537 individuals were under the surveillance order, and 802 individuals were released.

As of the end of February 2022, a total of 425 individuals are still placed under the detention order while another 2,166 individuals are still under surveillance orders.

He also reportedly said that “…based on the 2021 statistics, a total of 1,190 people had action taken against them under Poca compared with 1,968 in 2020 in several areas including Simpang Renggam, Pokok Sena, Bentong and Bintulu. He said most of the cases involved drug-related crimes and criminal fraud through the Internet…”

In March 2023, a media report stated, “…on Poca, Saifuddin (Home Minister Datuk Seri Saifuddin Nasution Ismail) said that 132 individuals were detained, of which 67 were Malays, 13 Chinese, 38 Indians, 13 of other races and one foreigner. He said those detained were between 19 and 59 years old…”

Poca, originally for violent crimes committed by triads and gangs, has since been amended. It can be applied broadly even for all penal code offences suspected to be committed by more than one.

== MADPET in the media ==
NGO opposes hanging of Zulfarhan’s 6 murderers; propose jail sentence of 30-40 years instead- Focus Malaysia 25/7/2024

Madpet: Single mum's death sentence shows drug law harsh on the poor - Malaysiakini, 20/10/2021

Abolish death penalty, suspend pending executions, say groups, MP - FMT, 10/10/2021

Human rights groups call for inquests into recent police custodial deaths - Malay Mail, 7/6/2021

Independent coroners and inquests needed for all deaths in custody - ALIRAN, 18/6/2021

Inquests for deaths caused by police shootings: Madpet - Malaysiakini, 18/9/2019

Hukuman mati: MP pembangkang, senator usah sabotaj pula - Berita Harian, 11/10/2018

Madpet shocked at execution on verge of abolition of mandatory death penalty - Malaysiakini, 24/9/2016

We voted for a moratorium on the death penalty - Star, 23/12/2020

Human Rights Groups Denounce Malaysia for Hanging Murderers - The News Lens, 29/3/2016

Making a change - 29/11/2015

== See also ==
- List of most recent executions by jurisdiction
