= Kidnapping Act 1961 =

Parliament of Malaysia
- Long title: An Act to provide for the detection and punishment of the offences of abduction, wrongful restraint and wrongful confinement for ransom and other related offences and for matters incidental thereto.
- Citation: Act 365
- Territorial extent: Throughout Malaysia
- Passed by: Dewan Rakyat
- Passed: 9 August 1961
- Enacted: 1961 (Act No. 41 of 1961) & 1963 (Act No. 5 of 1963); Revised: 1989 (Act 365 w.e.f. 13 April 1989)
- Passed by: Dewan Negara
- Passed: 26 June 1961
- Effective: [Peninsular Malaysia—21 September 1961; Sabah and Sarawak—24 February 1989, P.U. (A) 56/1989; Federal Territory of Labuan—24 February 1989, P.U. (A) 55/1989.]

Legislative history

Initiating chamber: Dewan Rakyat
- Bill title: Kidnapping Bill 1961
- Introduced by: Leong Yew Koh, Minister of Justice
- First reading: 8 August 1961
- Second reading: 8 August 1961
- Third reading: 9 August 1961

Revising chamber: Dewan Negara
- Bill title: Kidnapping Bill 1961
- Member(s) in charge: Leong Yew Koh, Minister of Justice
- First reading: [ ]
- Second reading: 26 June 1961
- Third reading: 26 June 1961

Amended by
- Kidnapping (Amendment) Act 1967 [Act 33/1967] Titles of Office Ordinance 1949 [P.U. (B) 324/1970] Bank Simpanan Nasional Act 1974 [Act 146] Modification of Laws (Kidnapping Act) (Extension to the States of Sabah and Sarawak) Order 1989 [P.U. (A) 56/1989] Kidnapping (Amendment) Act 1995 [Act A910] Abolition of Mandatory Death Penalty Act 2023 [Act 846]
- Status: In force

The Kidnapping Act 1961 (Malay: Akta Penculikan 1961), is an Act of the Parliament of Malaysia. It was enacted to provide for the detection and punishment of the offences of abduction, wrongful restraint and wrongful confinement for ransom and other related offences and for matters incidental thereto.

== Structure ==
The Kidnapping Act 1961, in its current form (1 January 2006), consists of 16 sections and no schedule (including 5 amendments), without separate Part.

- Section 1: Short title and application
- Section 2: Interpretation
- Section 3: Abduction, wrongful restraint or wrongful confinement for ransom
- Section 4: Seizure and forfeiture of conveyance
- Section 5: Knowingly receiving ransom
- Section 6: Knowingly negotiating to obtain, or for payment of, ransom
- Section 7: Power to freeze bank account
- Section 8: Public Prosecutor’s power to order inspection of books, accounts, receipts, vouchers or other documents
- Section 9: Public Prosecutor’s powers to obtain information
- Section 10: Duty to give information to police
- Section 11: Power to intercept communication
- Section 12: Remand in custody of police
- Section 13: Evidence of accomplice
- Section 14: Evidence of pecuniary resources or property
- Section 15: Protection of informers
- Section 16: Admission of statements in evidence

== Section 3 ==
Section 3(1) created a capital offence with a discretionary death penalty. The death penalty for this offence was abolished by sections 52 and 53 of the Abolition of Mandatory Death Penalty Act 2023.

Lee Ah Kiew was sentenced to death, under this section, in 1985, and was executed on 21 May 1987. He was said to have been first to be so executed.

The following cases were decided under this section:

- Soh Ten Seng & Ors v Public Prosecutor
- Bernhard Foon & Ors v Public Prosecutor
- Kidnapping charge for the four accused in the 2008 murder of Lai Ying Xin
