= Customs Act 1967 =

Malaysian law

Parliament of Malaysia
- Long title: An Act relating to customs.
- Citation: Act 235
- Territorial extent: Throughout Malaysia
- Passed by: Dewan Rakyat
- Passed: 25 August 1967
- Enacted: 1967 (Act No. 62 of 1967); Revised: 1980 (Act 235 w.e.f. 17 July 1980)
- Enacted by: Dewan Negara
- Effective: [2 November 1967, P.U. 503/1967]

Legislative history

First chamber: Dewan Rakyat
- Bill title: Customs Bill 1967
- Introduced by: Ng Kam Poh, Assistant Minister of Finance
- First reading: 21 August 1967
- Second reading: 25 August 1967
- Third reading: 25 August 1967

Second chamber: Dewan Negara
- Bill title: Customs Bill 1967
- Member(s) in charge: Ng Kam Poh, Assistant Minister of Finance
- First reading: 28 August 1967
- Second reading: 29 August 1967
- Third reading: 29 August 1967

Amended by
- Emergency (Essential Powers) Ordinance No. 26, 1970 (Part VI, Second Schedule) [P.U. (A) 92/1970] Free Trade Zones Act 1971 [Act 24] Customs (Amendment) Act 1972 [Act A147] Customs (Amendment) Act 1973 [Act A161] Customs (Amendment) (No. 2) Act 1973 [Act A187] Customs (Amendment) Act 1974 [Act A241] Customs (Amendment) Act 1975 [Act A313] Malaysian Currency (Ringgit) Act 1975 [Act 160] Customs (Amendment) Act 1976 [Act A352] Subordinate Courts (Amendment) Act 1978 [Act A434] Finance Act 1983 [Act 293] Finance (No. 2) Act 1986 [Act 329] Customs (Amendment) Act 1990 [Act A783] Finance Act 1991 [Act 451] Free Zones Act 1990 [Act 438] Customs (Amendment) Act 1994 [Act A873] Customs (Amendment) Act 1995 [Act A921] Customs (Amendment) Act 1996 [Act A960] Finance Act 1997 [Act 557] Finance Act 1998 [Act 578] Customs (Amendment) Act 1999 [Act A1057] Customs (Amendment) Act 2001 [Act A1109] Customs (Amendment) Act 2002 [Act A1162] Customs (Amendment) (No. 2) Act 2002 [Act A1181]

Related legislation
- Customs Ordinance 1952 of the States of Malaya [F.M. Ordinance No. 42 of 1952] Customs Ordinance of Sabah [Sabah Cap. 33] Customs Ordinance of Sarawak [Sarawak Cap. 26]
- Status: In force

The Customs Act 1967 (Malay: Akta Kastam 1967), is an Act of the Parliament of Malaysia, relating to customs. Many subsequent amendments to it have also been passed.

== Structure ==
The Customs Act 1967, in its current form (), consists of 21 Parts containing 169 sections and 1 schedule (including 24 amendments).

- Part I: Preliminary
- Part II: Appointment and Powers of Officers
- Part III: Levying of Customs Duties
- Part IV: Importation and Exportation
- Part V: Port Clearances
- Part VI: General Provisions Affecting Vessels in Territorial Waters
- Part VII: Manifests
- Part VIII: Warehousing
- Part IX: Declaration of Goods
  - A—Dutiable goods
  - B—Non-dutiable goods
  - C—General Provisions
- Part X: Drawback
- Part XI: Miscellaneous Provisions
- Part XII: Inspection, Investigation, Search, Seizure and Arrest
- Part XIII: Provisions as to Trials and Proceedings
- Part XIV: Offences and Penalties
- Part XV: Regulations
- Part XVI: General
- Part XVII: Special Provisions Dealing with Penang
- Part XVIII: Special Provisions Dealing with Labuan
- Part XIX: Special Provisions Dealing with Sabah and Sarawak
- Part XIXA: Special Provisions Dealing with Langkawi
- Part XIXB: Special Provisions Dealing with the Joint Development Area
- Part XIXC: Special Provisions Dealing with Tioman
- Part XX: Singapore Preventive Vessels
- Part XXI: Repeal
- Schedule
