= Criminal Procedure Code (Malaysia) =

- Long title: An Act relating to criminal procedure.
- Citation: Act 593
- Territorial extent: Malaysia
- Enacted: 1935 (F.M.S. Cap. 6); Revised: 1999 (Act 593 w.e.f. 4 April 1999)
- Effective: Throughout Malaysia—10 January 1976, Act A324

Amended by
- Criminal Procedure Code (Amendment) Enactment 1936 [En. No. 19/1936] Statute Law Revision (Chief Secretary’s Powers) Enactment 1937 [En. No. 18/1937] Statute Law Revision (General Amendments) Enactment 1938 [En. No. 3/1938] Criminal Procedure Code (Amendment) Enactment 1938 [En. No. 29/1938] Criminal Procedure (Amendment) Ordinance 1947 [Ord. 13/1947] Transfer of Powers Ordinance 1948 [F.M. No. 1/1948] Courts Ordinance 1948 [F.M. No. 43/1948] Married Women and Children (Maintenance) 1950 [Ord. 36/1950] Criminal Procedure Codes (Amendment) Ordinance 1952 [Ord. 1/1952] The Police Ordinance 1952 [Ord. 14/1952] Criminal Procedure Codes (Amendment No. 2) Ordinance 1952 [Ord. 79/1952] Rule Committee Ordinance 1948 [L.N. 239/1953] Rule Committee Ordinance 1948 [L.N. 240/1953] Rule Committee Ordinance 1948 [L.N. 241/1953] Criminal Justice Ordinance 1953 [Ord. 14/1953] Criminal Procedure Codes (Amendment) Ordinance 1954 [Ord. 8/1954] Criminal Procedure Codes (Amendment) Ordinance 1955 [Ord. 21/1955] Federation of Malaya Agreement (Transfer of Powers of British Advisers) Order 1957 [L.N. 161/1957] Federal Constitution (Modification of Laws) Order 1957 [L.N. (N.S.) 1/1957] Federal Constitution (Modification of Laws) Order 1957 [L.N. (N.S.) 56/1957] Federal Constitution (Modification of Laws) (No. 2) Order 1957 [L.N. (N.S.) 73/1957] Criminal Procedure Code (Amendment) Ordinance 1957 [Ord. 69/1957] Criminal Procedure Code (Amendment) Ordinance 1958 [Ord. 73/1958] Kidnapping Act 1963 [Act 5/1963] Criminal Procedure Code (Amendment) Act 1963 [Act 9/1963] Warrants and Summonses (Special Provisions) Act 1965 [Act 6/1965] Modification of Laws (Criminal Procedure) (Powers of Arrest) (Malaysia) Order 1965 [L.N. 228/1965] Criminal Procedure Code (Amendment) Act 1967 [Act 25/1967] Criminal Procedure Code (Amendment) (No. 2) Act 1967 [Act 38/1967] Criminal Procedure Code (Amendment) Act 1969 [Act A6] Emergency (Essential Powers) Ordinance No. 14 of 1969 [P.U. (A) 521/1969] Criminal Procedure Code (Amendment) Act 1974 [Act A233] Criminal Procedure Code (Amendment and Extension) Act 1976 [Act A324] Criminal Procedure Code (Amendment) Act 1976 [Act A365] Modification of Laws (Criminal Procedure) (Sabah and Sarawak) Order 1976 [P.U. (A) 97/1976] Penal Code and Criminal Procedure Code (Amendment) Act 1983 [Act A549] Penal Code (Amendment) Act 1985 [Act A614] Criminal Procedure Code (Amendment) Act 1989 [Act A728] Criminal Procedure Code (Amendment) Act 1993 [Act A841] Criminal Procedure Code (Amendment) Act 1995 [Act A908] Criminal Procedure Code (Amendment) Act 1997 [Act A979] Criminal Procedure Code (Amendment) Act 1998 [Act A1015] Criminal Procedure (Amendment) Act 2001 [Act A1132] Revision of Laws (Rectification of Criminal Procedure Code) Order 2005 [P.U. (A) 224/2005]

Keywords
- Criminal procedure code
- Status: In force

The Criminal Procedure Code (Malay: Kanun Tatacara Jenayah), are Malaysian laws which enacted relating to criminal procedure.

== Structure ==
The Criminal Procedure Code, in its current form (1 January 2006), consists of 4 Parts containing 44 chapters, 444 sections and 3 schedules (including 44 amendments).

=== Part I: Preliminary ===
==== Chapter I ====
1. Short title
2. Interpretation
3. Trial of offences under Penal Code and other laws
4. Saving of powers of High Court
5. Laws of England, when applicable

=== Part II: Provisions as to Criminal Courts ===
==== Chapter II: Criminal Courts in General ====
6. Courts
7. Courts to be open
8. (Deleted)
9. Criminal jurisdiction of Magistrates
10. Offences committed within seven miles of the boundary of a State

=== Part III: General Provisions ===
==== Chapter III: Aid and Information to Magistrates and Police and Persons Making Arrests ====
11. Public, when to assist Magistrates, Justices of the Peace and police
12. Aid to persons other than police officer executing warrant
13. Public to give information of certain matters
14. Police officer bound to report certain matters

==== Chapter IV: Arrest, Escape and Re-taking ====
15. Arrest, how made
16. Search of place entered by person sought to be arrested
17. Search of persons in place searched under warrant
18. Power to break open any place for purposes of liberation
19. No unnecessary restraint and mode of searching women
20. Search of persons arrested
21. Power to seize offensive weapons
22. Search of person for name and address
23. When police or penghulu may arrest without warrant
24. Refusal to give name and residence
25. How person arrested by penghulu is to be dealt with
26. Pursuit of offenders
27. Arrest by private persons and procedure in such cases
28. How person arrested is to be dealt with and detention for more than twenty-four hours
29. Release of person arrested
30. Offence committed in Magistrate’s presence
31. Arrest by or in presence of Magistrate
32. Power on escape to pursue and re-take
33. Sections 16 and 18 to apply to arrests under section 32

==== Chapter V: Processes to Compel Appearance ====
Summons
34. Form of summons and service
35. Summons how served
36. Procedure when personal service cannot be effected
37. Proof of service
37A. (Deleted)

Warrant of Arrest
38. Form of warrant of arrest
39. Court may direct by indorsement on warrant security to be taken
40. Warrants, to whom directed
41. Notification of substance of warrant
42. Person arrested to be brought before Court without delay
43. Procedure on arrest of person against whom warrant is issued

Proclamation and Attachment
44. Proclamation for person absconding
45. Attachment of property of person proclaimed
46. Restoration of attached property

Other Rules Regarding Summonses to Appear and Warrants of Arrest
47. Issue of warrant in lieu of or in addition to summons
48. Summonses to appear and warrants of arrest may be executed in any part of Malaysia
49. Power to take bond for appearance
50. Arrest on breach of bond for appearance

==== Chapter VI: Processes to Compel the Production of Documents and Other Movable Property and for the Discovery of Persons Wrongfully Confined ====
51. Summons to produce document or other things
52. Procedure as to postal article, etc.
53. Sections 34 to 37 to apply

Search Warrants
54. When search warrant may be issued
55. Power to restrict search warrant
56. Magistrate may issue warrant authorizing search for evidence of offence
57. Form of search warrant
58. Search for persons wrongfully confined
59. Persons in charge of closed places to allow search
60. Magistrate issuing search warrant may attend at its execution
61. Magistrate may direct search in his presence
62. Search without warrant
62A. Forfeiture of counterfeit coin
62B. Forfeiture of counterfeit currency
63. Summary search
64. List of all things seized to be made and signed
65. Occupant to be present at search

=== Part IV: Prevention of Offences ===
==== Chapter VII: Security for Keeping the Peace and for Good Behaviour ====
66. Security for keeping the peace on conviction
66A. Security for keeping the peace by complainant
67. Security for keeping the peace in other cases
68. Security for good behaviour from suspected persons, vagrants and persons disseminating seditious matter
69. Security for good behaviour from habitual offenders
70. Summons or warrant if required
71. Form of summons or warrant
72. Power to dispense with personal attendance
73. Inquiry to be held
74. Order to give security
75. Discharge of person informed against

Proceedings in All Cases Subsequent to Order to Furnish Security
76. Commencement of period for which security is required
77. Contents of bond
78. Power to reject sureties
79. Imprisonment in default of security
80. Power to release person imprisoned for failing to give security
81. Magistrate to report in cases in which the security has been ordered by the High Court
82. Discharge of sureties

==== Chapter VIII: Unlawful Assemblies ====
83. Who may order unlawful assembly to disperse
84. Forcible dispersal of unlawful assemblies
85–87. (Deleted)
88. Protection against prosecution

==== Chapter IX: Public Nuisances ====
89. Magistrate may make conditional order for removal of nuisance
90. Order to be served or notified
91. Person against whom order is made to obey or appear and show cause
92. Consequence of his failing to do so
93. Procedure on appearance to show cause
94. Procedure on order being made absolute
95. Consequence of disobedience to order
96. Injunction pending final decision
97. Power to prohibit repetition or continuance of public nuisance

==== Chapter X: Temporary Orders in Urgent Cases of Nuisance ====
98. Power to issue order absolute at once in urgent cases of nuisance

==== Chapter XI: Disputes as to Immovable Property ====
99. Procedure where dispute concerning land, etc., is likely to cause breach of peace
100. Power to attach subject of dispute
101. Disputes concerning rights over land or water
102. Order as to costs

==== Chapter XII: Preventive Action of the Police ====
103. Police to prevent seizable offences
104. Information of design to commit seizable offences
105. Arrest to prevent seizable offences
106. Prevention of injury to public property

=== Part V: Information to Police and Their Powers to Investigate ===
==== Chapter XIII ====
107. Information of offences
108. Procedure in non-seizable cases
108A. Admission of certified copy of information as evidence
109. Investigation in seizable cases
110. Procedure where seizable offence suspected
111. Police officer’s power to require attendance of witnesses
112. Examination of witnesses by police
113. Admission of statements in evidence
114. No discouragement from making statement to police
115. Power to record statements and confessions
116. Search by police officer
117. Procedure where investigation cannot be completed within twenty-four hours
118. Police officer may require bond for appearance of complainant and witnesses
119. Diary of proceedings in investigation
120. Report of police officer

=== Part VI: Proceedings in Prosecutions ===
==== Chapter XIV: Jurisdiction of Criminal Courts in Inquiries and Trials ====
121. Ordinary place of inquiry and trial
122. Accused triable in place where act is done or where consequence ensues
123. Place of trial where act is an offence by reason of relation to other offence
124. Offences of escaping from custody, of criminal misappropriation or criminal breach of trust and of stealing, where triable
125. Where scene of offence is uncertain, etc.
126. Offence committed on a journey
127. When doubt arises High Court to decide
127A. Liability for offences committed out of Malaysia
127B. Power to direct copies of depositions and exhibits to be received in evidence

Conditions Requisite for Initiation of Proceedings
128. Cognizance of offences by Magistrates
129. Sanction required for prosecution for certain offences
130. Where complaint by Public Prosecutor is necessary
131. Where complaint by person aggrieved
132. Where complaint by husband

==== Chapter XV: Complaints to Magistrates ====
133. Examination of complainant
134. Postponement of issue of process
135. Dismissal of complaint

==== Chapter XVI: Commencement of Proceedings before a Magistrate's Court ====
136. Issue of process
137. Personal attendance of accused may be dispensed with

==== Chapter XVII: Preliminary Inquiries into Cases Triable by the High Court ====
138–151. (Deleted)

==== Chapter XVIIA: Special Procedure Relating to Committal in Cases Triable by the High Court where the Accused Is Legally Represented ====
151A–151B. (Deleted)

==== Chapter XVIII: The Charge ====
152. Form of charge
153. Particulars as to time, place and person
154. When manner of committing offence must be stated
155. Sense of words used in charge to describe offence
156. Effect of errors
157. (Deleted)
158. Court may alter or add to charge
159. When trial may proceed immediately after alteration or addition
160. When new trial may be directed or trial suspended
161. Stay of proceedings if prosecution of offence in altered charge requires previous sanction
162. Recall of witnesses when charge altered
163. Separate charges for distinct offences
164. Three offences of same kind within twelve months may be charged together
165. Trial for more than one offence
166. Where it is doubtful what offence has been committed
167. When a person charged with one offence can be convicted of another
168. Person charged with an offence can be convicted of the attempt
169. When offence proved is included in offence charged
170. When persons may be charged jointly
171. Withdrawal of remaining charges on conviction on one of several charges
171A. Outstanding offences
172. Charges to be in forms in Second Schedule

==== Chapter XIX: Summary Trials by Magistrates ====
173. Procedure in summary trials
173A. Power to discharge conditionally or unconditionally
174. Addresses
175. Power to award compensation
176. Particulars to be recorded
177. Transfer of cases
177A. Transmission of case to, and trial by, the High Court

==== Chapter XX: Trials before the High Court ====
178. Commencement of trial
179. Opening case for prosecution
180. Procedure after conclusion of case for prosecution
181. Defence
182. Reply
182A. Procedure at the conclusion of the trial
183. Sentence

==== Chapter XXI: Trials before the High Court with the Aid of Assessors ====
183A–199. (Deleted)

==== Chapter XXII: Trials by Jury before the High Court ====
199A–235. (Deleted)

==== Chapter XXIII: Jurors and Assessors ====
235A–251. (Deleted)

==== Chapter XXIV: General Provisions as to Inquiries and Trials ====
252–252A. (Deleted)
253. Procedure where there are previous convictions
254. Public Prosecutor may decline to prosecute further at any stage
255. Right of accused to be defended
256. Court may put questions to accused
257. Case for prosecution to be explained by Court to undefended accused
258. Procedure where accused does not understand proceedings
259. Power to postpone or adjourn proceedings
260. Compounding offences
261. Change of Magistrate during hearing
262. Detention of offenders attending in Court
263. Weekly or public holiday

==== Chapter XXV: Mode of Taking and Recording Evidence in Inquiries and Trials ====
264. Evidence to be taken in presence of accused
265. Manner of recording evidence
266. Recording evidence in summons cases
267. Recording evidence in other cases
268. Record to be in narrative form
269. Reading over evidence and correction
270. Interpretation of evidence to accused
271. Remarks as to demeanour of witness
272. Judge to take notes of evidence
272A. Other persons may be authorized to take down notes of evidence

==== Chapter XXVI: Judgment ====
273. Mode of delivering judgment
274. (Deleted)
275. Sentence of death not to be passed on pregnant woman
276. Judgment in the alternative
277. Judgment of death
278. Judgment not to be altered
279. Judgment to be explained to accused and copy supplied
280. Judgment to be filed with record

==== Chapter XXVII: Sentences and the Carrying Out of It ====
281. Provisions as to execution of sentences of death
282. Provisions as to execution of sentences of imprisonment
283. Provisions as to sentences of fine
284. Suspension of execution in certain cases
285. Warrant by whom issuable
286. Place for executing sentence of whipping
287. Time of executing such sentence
288. Mode of executing such sentence
289. Sentence of whipping forbidden in certain cases
290. Medical Officer’s certificate required
291. Procedure if whipping cannot be inflicted
292. Commencement of sentence of imprisonment on prisoner already undergoing imprisonment
293. Youthful offenders
294. First offenders
294A. Conditions of bonds
295. Sentence of police supervision
296. Obligations of persons subject to supervision
297. Penalty for non-compliance with section 296
298. Application of law to orders for police supervision made outside the Malay States
299. Return of warrant

==== Chapter XXVIII: Suspensions, Remissions and Commutations of Sentences ====
300. Power to suspend or remit sentence
301. Power to commute punishment

==== Chapter XXIX: Previous Acquittals or Convictions ====
302. Person once convicted or acquitted not to be tried again for same offence
303. Plea of previous acquittal or conviction

=== Part VII: Appeal and Revision ===
==== Chapter XXX: Appeals to the High Court ====
303A. Appeals from Sessions Courts
304. Cases in which no appeal lies
305. When plea of guilty limited right of appeal
306. Appeal against acquittal
307. Procedure for appeal
308. Transmission of appeal record
309. (Deleted)
310. Appeal specially allowed in certain cases
311. Stay of execution pending appeal
312. Setting down appeal on list
313. Procedure at hearing
314. Non-appearance of respondent
315. Arrest of respondent in certain cases
316. Decision on appeal
317. Order to take further evidence
318. Judgment
319. Certificate and consequence of judgment
320. Death of parties to appeal
321. (Deleted)
322. Costs

==== Chapter XXXI: Revision ====
323. Power to call for records of subordinate Courts
324. Power to order further inquiry
325. Powers of Judge on revision
326. Permission for parties to appear
327. Orders on revision

=== Part VIII: Special Proceedings ===
==== Chapter XXXII: Inquiries of Death ====
328. Meaning of “cause of death”
329. Duty of police officer to investigate death
330. Duty of officer to arrange for post-mortem examination in certain cases
331. Post-mortem examination of body
332. Report of Government Medical Officer
333. Duty of Magistrate on receipt of report
334. Inquiry into cause of death of a person in custody of police or in any asylum
335. Powers of Magistrate
336. Magistrate may view body
337. Inquiries to be made by Magistrate
338. Evidence and finding to be recorded
339. Power of Public Prosecutor to require inquiry to be held
340. Admissibility of medical report in certain cases
341. Custody of proceedings
341A. Power to revise

==== Chapter XXXIII: Persons of Unsound Mind ====
342. Procedure where accused is suspected to be of unsound mind
343. Certificate of Medical Superintendent
344. Release of person of unsound mind pending investigation or trial
345. Resumption of trial
346. (Deleted)
347. Judgment of acquittal on ground of mental disorder
348. Safe custody of person acquitted
349. Procedure where prisoner of unsound mind is reported able to make his defence
350. Procedure where person of unsound mind is reported fit for discharge
351. Delivery of person of unsound mind to care of relative
352. Interpretation of "mental hospital" and "visitors"
352A. Modification in the application in this Chapter to Sabah and Sarawak

==== Chapter XXXIV: Proceedings in Case of Certain Offences Affecting the Administration of Justice ====
353. Procedure as to offences committed in Court
354. Record of facts constituting the offence
355. Alternative procedure
356. Power to remit punishment
357. Refusal to give evidence
358. Appeal
359. Magistrate not to try certain offences committed before himself

==== Chapter XXXV: Maintenance of Wives and Children ====
360–364. (Deleted)

==== Chapter XXXVI: Directions of the Nature of a Habeas Corpus ====
365. Power of High Court to make certain orders
366. Form of application
367. Affidavit, by whom signed
368. Copy of warrant
369. Defendant in custody under writ of attachment to be brought before Court
370. Warrant to be prepared
371. Service of warrant
372. Attendance of prisoner in criminal case
373. Duty of officer to whom warrant is addressed
374. Appeal
375. No application to banishment warrant

=== Part IX: Supplementary Provisions ===
==== Chapter XXXVII: The Public Prosecutor ====
376. Public Prosecutor
377. Conduct of prosecutions in Court
378. No one to appear for Public Prosecutor
379. Employment of advocate
380. Prosecution by private persons
380A. Sections 377 and 380 to prevail over other laws
381–386. (Deleted)

==== Chapter XXXVIII: Bail ====
387. When person may be released on bail
388. When person accused of non-bailable offence may be released on bail
389. Amount of bond
390. Bond to be executed
391. Person to be released
392. When warrant of arrest may be issued against person bailed
393. Sureties may apply to have bond discharged
394. Appeal

==== Chapter XXXIX: Special Provisions Relating to Evidence ====
395. Procedure where person able to give material evidence is dangerously ill
396. Where person bound to give evidence intends to leave Malaysia
397. Deposition of medical witness
398. (Deleted)
399. Reports of certain persons
399A. Report of Central Bank on currency note or coin
400. How previous conviction or acquittal may be proved
401. Record of evidence in absence of accused
402. (Deleted)
402A. Notice to be given of defence of alibi

==== Chapter XL: Provisions as to Bonds ====
403. Deposit instead of bond
404. Procedure on forfeiture of bond
405. Appeal from orders
406. Power to direct levy of amount due on bond

==== Chapter XLI: Disposal of Exhibits and of Property the Subject of Offences ====
406A. Court shall consider manner of disposal of exhibits
407. Order for disposal of property regarding which offence committed
408. Direction instead of order
409. Payment to innocent person of money found on accused
410. Stay of order
411. Destruction of libellous and other matter
412. Restoration of possession of immovable property
413. Procedure by police on seizure of property
414. Procedure where no claim established
415. Procedure where property is perishable or of small value
416. Procedure where owner is absent

==== Chapter XLII: Transfer of Criminal Cases ====
417. High Court’s power to transfer cases
418. Application for transfer to be supported by affidavit
418A. Trials by High Court on a certificate by the Public Prosecutor
418B. Cases to which section 418A is applicable

==== Chapter XLIII: Irregularities in Proceedings ====
419. Proceeding in wrong place, etc.
420. Procedure when confession irregularly taken
421. Omission to frame charge
422. Irregularities not to vitiate proceedings
423. Irregularity in distress

==== Chapter XLIV: Miscellaneous ====
424. Affidavits before whom sworn
425. Power of Court to summon and examine persons
426. Order for payment of costs of prosecution and compensation
427. Payment of expenses of prosecutors and witnesses
428. Rules as to rates of payment
429. (Deleted)
430. Reward for unusual exertion
431. Compensation for family of person killed in arresting
432. Provisions as to money payable as costs or compensation
433. Copies of proceedings
434. (Deleted)
435. Power of police to seize property suspected of being stolen
436. Person released on bail to give address for service
437. Power to compel restoration of abducted persons
438. Compensation for giving in charge groundlessly
439. Magistrate not to act where interested
440. Public servants not to bid at sales under this Code
441. When receivers, etc., charged, evidence of other cases allowed
442. When evidence of previous conviction may be given
443. Forms
444. Application of fines

=== Second Schedule: Forms ===
1. Summons to an Accused Person
2. Warrant of Arrest
3. Bond and Bail Bond after Arrest under a Warrant
4. Proclamation Requiring the Appearance of a Person Accused
5. Proclamation Requiring the Attendance of a Witness
6. Order of Attachment to Compel the Attendance of a Witness
7. Warrant in the First Instance to Bring up a Witness
8. Warrant to Search after Information of a Particular Offence
9. Warrant to Search Suspected Place of Deposit
10. Bond to Keep the Peace
11. Bond for Good Behaviour
12. Order to Show Cause
13. Summons on Information of a Probable Breach of the Peace
14. Warrant of Commitment on Failure to Find Security to Keep the Peace
15. Warrant of Commitment on Failure to Find Security for Good Behaviour
16. Warrant to Discharge a Person Imprisoned on Failure to give Security
17. Order for the Removal of Nuisances
18. Notice and Peremptory Order by Magistrate after Order Absolute
19. Injunction to Provide Against Imminent Danger Pending Decision
20. Order of Magistrate Prohibiting the Repetition, etc., of a Nuisance
21. Order of Magistrate to prevent Obstruction, Riot, etc.
22. Order of Magistrate Declaring Party Entitled to Retain Possession of Land, etc., in Dispute
23. Warrant of Attachment in the Case of a Dispute as to the Possession of Land, etc.
24. Order of Magistrate Prohibiting the Doing of Anything on Land or Water
25. Bond to Prosecute or give Evidence
26. Report of Police Investigation
27. Charges

(I) Charges with one head
(II) Charges with two or more heads
(III) Charge for Theft after a Previous Conviction

28. Formal Part of Charges Tried Before the High Court
29. Warrant of Commitment on a Sentence of Imprisonment or Fine
30. Warrant of Imprisonment on Failure to Recover Amends by Distress
31. Summons to a Witness
32. (Deleted)
33. Warrant of Commitment under Sentence of Death
34. Warrant of Execution on a Sentence of Death
35. Warrant to Levy a Fine by Distress and Sale
36. Bond to Appear and Receive Judgment
37. Warrant of Commitment in Certain Cases of Contempt when a Fine is Imposed
38. Warrant of Commitment of Witness Refusing to Answer
39. (Deleted)
40. Warrant to Discharge a Person Imprisoned on Failure to give Security
41. Warrant of Attachment to Enforce a Bond
42. Notice to Surety on Breach of a Bond
43. Notice to Surety of Forfeiture of Bond for Good Behaviour
44. Warrant of Attachment against a Surety
45. Warrant of Commitment of the Surety of an Accused Person Admitted to Bail
46. Notice to the Principal of Forfeiture of a Bond to Keep the Peace
47. Warrant to Attach the Property of the Principal on Breach of a Bond to Keep the Peace
48. Warrant of Imprisonment on Breach of a Bond to Keep the Peace
49. Warrant of Attachment and Sale on Forfeiture of Bond for Good Behaviour
50. Warrant of Imprisonment on Forfeiture of Bond for Good Behaviour
51. Form of Petition of Appeal
52. Form of Warrant
53. Form of Warrant
54. Warrant to Bring up Prisoner to Give Evidence
