= Dangerous Drugs Act 1952 =

Federal Legislative Council
- Long title: An Act to make further and better provision for the regulating of the importation, exportation, manufacture, sale, and use of opium and of certain other dangerous drugs and substances, to make special provision relating to the jurisdiction of courts in respect of offences thereunder and their trial, and for purposes connected therewith.
- Citation: Act 234
- Territorial extent: Malaysia
- Enacted: 1952 (Ordinance No. 30 of 1952); Revised: 1980 (Act 234 w.e.f 17 July 1980)
- Assented to: 24 July 1952 (High Commissioner of Malaya)
- Royal assent: 22 July 1952 (Rulers of the Malay States)
- Effective: [Peninsular Malaysia—1 November 1952, L.N. 554/1952; Sabah and Sarawak—1 June 1978, P.U. (A) 157/1978]

Repeals
- Deleterious Drugs Ordinance [S.S. Cap. 190] Chandu Revenue Ordinance [S.S. Cap. 223] Opium and Chandu Enactment [F.M.S. Cap. 134] Deleterious Drugs Enactment [F.M.S. Cap. 183] Deleterious Drugs Enactment [Johore Enact. No. 96] Opium and Chandu Enactment [Johore Enact. No. 111] Enactment No. 29 (Deleterious Drugs) [Kedah Enact. No. 3 of 1348] Chandu Enactment [Kedah Enact. No. 8 of 1356] Opium and Chandu Enactment 1928 [Kelantan Enact. No. 15 of 1928] Deleterious Drugs Enactment [Kelantan Enact. No. 15 of 1938] Chandu Enactment [Trengganu Enact. No. 2 of 1352] Deleterious Drugs Enactment [Trengganu Enact. No. 62 of 1356] Chandu Enactment 1356 [Perlis Enact. No. 10 of 1356] Deleterious Drugs Enactment [Perlis Enact. No. 2 of 1348] Opium and Chandu Proclamation [B.M.A. Proclamation No. 49] Poisons and Deleterious Drugs Ordinance [Sabah Cap. 100] Dangerous Drugs Ordinance [Sarawak Cap. 119] Poisons Ordinance [Sarawak Cap. 121]

Amended by
- Dangerous Drugs Order 1956 [L.N. 336/1956] Dangerous Drugs Order 1958 [L.N. 185/1958] Federal Constitution (Modification of Laws) (Ordinances and Proclamations) Order 1958 [L.N. 332/1958] Dangerous Drugs Order 1961 [L.N. 165/1961] Dangerous Drugs Order 1963 [L.N. 60/1963] Dangerous Drugs (Amendment) Act 1966 [Act 64/1966] Dangerous Drugs Order 1969 [P.U. (A) 85/1969] Emergency (Essential Powers) Ordinance No. 82, 1971 [P.U. (A) 67/1971] Dangerous Drugs (Amendment) Act 1972 [Act A112] Dangerous Drugs (Amendment) Act 1973 [Act A194] Dangerous Drugs Order 1974 [P.U. (A) 164/1974] Dangerous Drugs Order (No. 2) 1974 [P.U. (A) 233/1974] Dangerous Drugs (Amendment) Act 1975 [Act A293] Dangerous Drugs (Amendment) (No. 2) Act 1975 [Act A318] Dangerous Drugs (Amendment) Act 1976 [Act A330] Dangerous Drugs Order 1976 [P.U. (A) 321/1976] Dangerous Drugs (Amendment) Act 1977 [Act A389] Dangerous Drugs (Amendment) (No. 2) Act 1977 [Act A390] Dangerous Drugs (Amendment) (No. 3) Act 1977 [Act A413] Dangerous Drugs (Amendment) Act 1978 [Act A426] Modification of Laws (Dangerous Drugs and Poisons) (Extension and Modification) Order 1978 [P.U. (A) 157/1978] Subordinate Courts (Amendment) Act 1978 [Act A434] Dangerous Drugs (Amendment) Act 1980 [Act A491] Dangerous Drugs (Amendment) Order 1981 [P.U. (A) 69/1981] Dangerous Drugs (Amendment) (No. 2) Order 1981 [P.U. (A) 116/1981] Dangerous Drugs (Amendment) (No. 3) Order 1981 [P.U. (A) 242/1981; Dangerous Drugs (Amendment) Act 1983 [Act A553] Drug Dependants (Treatment and Rehabilitation) Act 1983 [Act 283] Dangerous Drugs (Amendment) Order 1984 [P.U. (A) 263/1984] Dangerous Drugs (Amendment) Act 1984 [Act A596] Dangerous Drugs (Amendment) Order 1985 [P.U. (A) 319/1985] Dangerous Drugs (Amendment) Order 1986 [P.U. (A) 120/1986] Dangerous Drugs (Amendment) (No. 2) Order 1986 [P.U. (A) 225/1986] Dangerous Drugs (Amendment) Act 1986 [Act A659] Dangerous Drugs (Amendment) Order 1988 [P.U. (A) 174/1988] Dangerous Drugs (Amendment) Order 1991 [P.U. (A) 14/1991] Dangerous Drugs (Amendment) Act 1992 [Act A834] Dangerous Drugs (Amendment of First Schedule) Order 1996 [P.U. (A) 170/1996] Dangerous Drugs (Amendment) Order 1997 [P.U. (A) 500/1997] Dangerous Drugs (Amendment) Order 1998 [P.U. (A) 135/1998] Dangerous Drugs (Amendment) Act 1998 [Act A1025] Dangerous Drugs (Amendment) Order 1999 [P.U. (A) 320/1999] Dangerous Drugs (Amendment of First Schedule) Order 2001 [P.U. (A) 151/2001] Dangerous Drugs (Amendment of First Schedule) Order 2002 [P.U. (A) 145/2002] Dangerous Drugs (Amendment of First Schedule) (No. 2) Order 2002 [P.U. (A) 339/2002] Dangerous Drugs (Amendment) Act 2002 [Act A1167] Revision of Laws (Rectification of Dangerous Drugs Act 1952) Order 2003 [P.U. (A) 44/2003] Dangerous Drugs (Amendment) Act 2014 [Act A1457] Dangerous Drugs (Amendment of First Schedule) Order 2017 [P.U. (A) 267/2017] Dangerous Drugs (Amendment) Act 2017 [Act 1558] Dangerous Drugs (Amendment of First Schedule) Order 2019 [P.U. (A) 10/2019] Dangerous Drugs (Amendment of First Schedule) Order 2021 [P.U. (A) 296/2021] Dangerous Drugs (Amendment of First Schedule) Order 2023 [P.U. (A) 40/2023] Dangerous Drugs (Amendment of First Schedule) (No.2) Order 2023 [P.U. (A) 53/2023] Abolition of Mandatory Death Penalty Act 2023 [Act 846]

Keywords
- Dangerous drug
- Status: In force

The Dangerous Drugs Act 1952 (Malay: Akta Dadah Berbahaya 1952), is a Malaysian law which was enacted to make further and better provision for the regulation of the importation, exportation, manufacture, sale, and use of opium and certain other dangerous drugs and substances, to make special provision relating to the jurisdiction of courts in respect of offences thereunder and their trial, and for purposes connected therewith.

== Structure ==
The Dangerous Drugs Act 1952, in its current form (1 January 2006), consists of 6 Parts containing 50 sections and 3 schedules (including 47 amendments).

- Part I: Interpretation and Definitions
- Part II: Control of Raw Opium, Coca leaves, Poppy straw and Cannabis
- Part III: Control of Prepared Opium, Cannabis and Cannabis Resin
- Part IV: Control of Certain Dangerous Drugs
- Part V: Control of External Trade
- Part VI: Ancillary and General Provisions
- Schedules
