= Firearms (Increased Penalties) Act 1971 =

Malaysian law on firearms offences

Parliament of Malaysia
- Long title: An Act to provide increased penalties for the use of firearms in the commission of certain offences and for certain offences relating to firearms, and to make special provision relating to the jurisdiction of courts in respect of offences thereunder and their trial.
- Citation: Act 37
- Territorial extent: Throughout Malaysia
- Passed by: Dewan Rakyat
- Passed: 27 July 1971
- Passed by: Dewan Negara
- Passed: 10 August 1971
- Royal assent: 30 August 1971
- Commenced: 2 September 1971
- Effective: 1 October 1971, P.U.(B) 339/1971

Legislative history

Initiating chamber: Dewan Rakyat
- Bill title: Firearms (Increased Penalties) Bill 1971
- Bill citation: D.R.58/1971
- Introduced by: Abdul Kadir Yusof, Attorney General
- First reading: 5 July 1971
- Second reading: 27 July 1971
- Third reading: 27 July 1971

Revising chamber: Dewan Negara
- Bill title: Firearms (Increased Penalties) Bill 1971
- Bill citation: D.R.58/1971
- Member(s) in charge: Abdul Kadir Yusof, Attorney General
- First reading: 2 August 1971
- Second reading: 10 August 1971
- Third reading: 10 August 1971

Amended by
- Firearms (Increased Penalties) (Amendment) Act 1974 [Act A256] Arms (Amendment) Act 1974 [Act A266] Firearms (Increased Penalties) (Amendment) Act 1975 [Act A317] Firearms (Increased Penalties) (Amendment) Act 1978 [Act A427] Arms Act 1960 [Act 206]

Related legislation
- Arms Act 1960 [Act 206]

Keywords
- Firearm, extortion, robbery, kidnapping, burglary
- Status: In force

The Firearms (Increased Penalties) Act 1971 (Malay: Akta Senjata Api (Penalti Lebih Berat) 1971), is a Malaysian law that was enacted to provide increased penalties for the use of firearms in the commission of certain offences and for certain offences relating to firearms, and to make special provision relating to the jurisdiction of courts in respect of offences thereunder and their trial.

== Structure ==
The Firearms (Increased Penalties) Act 1971, in its current form (1 January 2006), consists of 12 sections and 1 schedule (including 5 amendments), without separate Part.

- Section 1: Short title, application, commencement and duration
- Section 2: Interpretation
- Section 3: Penalty for discharging a firearm in the commission of a scheduled offence
- Section 3A: Penalty for accomplices in case of discharge of firearm
- Section 4: Penalty for exhibiting a firearm in the commission of a scheduled offence
- Section 5: Penalty for having firearm in the commission of a scheduled offence
- Section 6: Penalty for exhibiting an imitation firearm in the commission of a scheduled offence
- Section 7: Penalty for trafficking in firearms
- Section 8: Penalty for unlawful possession of firearms
- Section 9: Penalty for consorting with persons carrying arms
- Section 10: Jurisdiction of Sessions Court
- Section 11: Special provisions relating to transmission of a case to, and trial by, the High Court
- Section 12: No bail to be granted in respect of offences under this Act
- Schedule

== See also ==
- Arms Act 1960
- Overview of gun laws by nation
