= Botak Chin =

Malaysian gangster

- Mugshot of Botak Chin
- Born: Wong Swee Chin; 3 March 1951; Kuala Lumpur, Selangor, Federation of Malaya (now Malaysia)
- Died: 11 June 1981 (age 30); Pudu Prison, Kuala Lumpur, Malaysia
- Cause of death: Execution by hanging
- Status: Sentence fulfilled on 11 June 1981
- Conviction: Armed robbery
- Penalty: Death

Wong Swee Chin, known professionally as Edmund Tan / Louis Ling / Botak Chin (3 March 1951–11 June 1981) was a Malaysian criminal and gangster. He rose to fame as one of the most notorious and dangerous gangsters during the 1960s and 1970s. He and his friend Kevin Yee Kai Kit were known for conducting armed robberies, which in a few cases involved huge amounts of cash. He was respected by the Chinese Hakka community and often regarded as modern-age Robin Hood, as some say he shared the cash from the robberies with the poor. On the evening of 16 February 1976, he was arrested by the police. He was executed on 11 June 1981 in Pudu Prison.

== Early life ==
Botak Chin was born in Kuala Lumpur on 3 March 1951 to a family of 10 siblings. His father worked with Malayan Railways, and as a child he lived at the Malaysian Railway quarters adjacent to the Caltex station on Jalan Ipoh in Kuala Lumpur. He studied at a Chinese vernacular primary school and then went on to attend the Methodist Boys' Secondary School in Sentul until Form 3. After dropping out from school, Botak Chin worked as a fishmonger at the market at Jalan Tun Ismail (formerly known as Maxwell Road). After his mother's death, he often spent time away from home, with his friends who were the local hoodlums that eventually led him to commit petty crimes. He joined a gang named Gang 360 (Sam Pak Lok), and he was impressed by the firearms possessed by the gang members. On 19 April 1969, Botak Chin and two of his friends took part in a robbery for the first time. At the age of 18, he proudly owned his first firearm, a .22 calibre revolver. He then formed his own gang shortly thereafter and proceeded to engage in robbery sprees.

== Crime sprees ==
Botak Chin engaged in eight robberies within a month in 1969. This led to his first arrest; he was convicted and sentenced to prison for 7 years. He was released before serving out his sentence and resolved to retire from gangsterism. However, his attempt to become clean and sell vegetables was unsatisfying financially; and he returned to crime.

== Personal life ==
Dr. Mahadevan, the former director of Tanjung Rambutan Mental Hospital in Ipoh, Perak, treated Botak Chin for 19 days to determine if he was adequately sane to stand trial. He found Botak Chin to be highly intelligent – but a "misguided genius".
