= Barlow and Chambers execution =

Executed Australian drug traffickers

- Date: 7 July 1986
- Location: Pudu Prison, Kuala Lumpur, Malaysia
- Type: Execution by hanging
- Perpetrator: Malaysian Prison Department
- Outcome: Kevin Barlow and Brian Chambers executed by hanging

Kevin Barlow

Brian Chambers

The Barlow and Chambers executions were the hangings on 7 July 1986 by Malaysia of two foreign nationals, Kevin John Barlow (Australian and British) and Brian Geoffrey Shergold Chambers (Australian) of Perth, Western Australia, for transporting 141.9 g (5.01 oz) of heroin.

The two men became the first Westerners to be executed under Malaysia's new tougher laws for drug offences. Under Section 39B(2) of the Dangerous Drugs Act 1952, "Any person who contravenes any of the provisions of subsection (1) shall be guilty of an offence against this Act and shall be punished on conviction with death..." Barlow was born in the United Kingdom in Stoke-on-Trent and held dual British and Australian nationalities. Barlow's family made appeals to UK Prime Minister Margaret Thatcher to make a protest about the impending execution, but she declined to do so. Australian Minister for Foreign Affairs Bill Hayden's appeal for clemency to the Malaysian government was rejected. The executions caused public outcry and strained political relations between Australia and Malaysia at the time.

== Background ==
Between early 1981 and the end of 1983 Chambers had made at least twelve trips abroad to transport heroin to Australia. In 1980 Chambers imported heroin to Australia using body packing techniques, placing the drugs in his anus. The rest of the load was swallowed. He used the same technique in 1981 when, on transit in Singapore, customs officers detected two vials of personal-use heroin in his jacket pocket. He was released after bribing officers.

Chambers and his then girlfriend, Susan Cheryl Jacobsen, decided to move to Melbourne to escape Perth's organised crime scene. Driving intoxicated near Penong, South Australia, Chambers crashed the vehicle. He was not seriously injured; Jacobsen, however, received severe injuries and spent several days in a coma before dying of her injuries on 20 May 1983.

== Planning ==
The drug run was organised by Perth criminal John Asciak. Chambers was enlisted for the job due to his experience in the task. Asciak soon learned Barlow had little money and few prospects for regular work. At the time Barlow was on compensation after injuring himself at work. He was depressed. He had also been threatened with the repossession of his car.

Though Barlow and Chambers later testified they were tourists travelling alone who met by chance in Singapore and then opted to travel together, their meeting in Singapore in October 1983 was planned by Asciak. Chambers had previously had a meeting with Barlow in Perth to approve him for the job. To help conceal their activities, Barlow had flown to Singapore directly from Perth, while Chambers had flown there via Sydney. After the Singapore meeting they disobeyed orders by travelling together and sharing the same hotel rooms; they had been directed to stay apart.

Barlow was a novice on his first drug run; he was convinced by organisers that as Chambers was an experienced drug courier the plan would proceed smoothly. Barlow was initially confident the drug run would be successful.

The proposed drug run had been openly discussed by John Asciak and Kevin Barlow in the household of Debbie Colyer-Long prior to the event. Colyer-Long's brother-in-law Trevor Lawson learned of it and had informed the National Crime Authority of the scheme.

== Drug trafficking ==
Having met in Singapore, Barlow and Chambers travelled by train to Penang in Malaysia. The package of drugs had been buried on a beach in Penang. Chambers was given directions to the site and dug up the package. Barlow was present but had not known the location of the heroin.

Initial plans were that Barlow and Chambers conceal the drugs by inserting some packages into their anuses and swallowing the rest. Barlow refused to do either, the former for reasons of distaste, the latter due to health concerns with that method. Chambers relented and placed the several packages of drugs, which were within plastic carry bags and wrapped in newspaper, into a newly purchased maroon suitcase. Barlow had become very nervous after the collection of the drugs.

== Arrest ==
Barlow and Chambers were observed alighting from the same taxi at Bayan Lepas International Airport on 9 November 1983. Barlow carried the maroon suitcase and entered the airport. He bypassed the luggage scanning area and approached the check-in desk. Chambers, carrying Barlow's bags, paid the taxi, entered the airport and passed through the luggage scanning area, and joined Barlow at the check-in desk. They were detained by police, as Barlow was seen to be very nervous.

Taken to an interview room they were asked to open the suitcases. Chambers opened the bags he was carrying. Barlow said he was unable to open the case he had carried and that it was Chambers's case. Chambers unlocked the case's combination locks and the drugs were found; however, he claimed he had not known the contents of the smaller carry bags the drugs were in.

When police handcuffed them, they were reportedly "shivering terribly".

== Imprisonment on remand ==
They were imprisoned in Penang Prison for all of 1984 and most of 1985. The prison was overcrowded. Built in 1849 to house up to 350 prisoners, in 1984 it housed 2,000 people including women and babies. Barlow and Chambers were locked in a two by three-metre cell together with up to three other prisoners for 22 hours a day, with an exercise period being allowed only if all cellmates had behaved that day. Chambers was well liked in prison; however, Barlow had trouble adjusting, and was described as being a "lunatic" and "cracking up".

Barlow attempted to excuse his actions by claiming that he had been forced to take the trip and his girlfriend threatened to leave him if he refused.

== Trial ==
Their trial started on 17 July 1985 at the High Court of Penang. The trial opened with both men claiming the drugs found in the maroon suitcase belonged to the other. Chambers was represented at the trial by Rasiah Rajasingham and Barlow by Karpal Singh.

Chambers remained handcuffed through the trial. Barlow was not cuffed but used crutches due to a groin injury. The arresting officer testified that he saw Barlow holding the maroon suitcase and shivering while waiting to board the plane. The court heard that Chambers had acknowledged ownership of the suitcase two days after the arrest. Chambers testified in court that he didn't know about the drugs in the case, and that Barlow had also used the case. Chambers also testified that Barlow had attempted to bribe a policeman at the airport when the drugs were discovered.

On 23 July the judge rejected Singh's attempt to have Rajasingham disqualified on grounds that he had received confidential information from Barlow in the nine months before the trial when he acted for both of the accused. The trial concluded on 24 July and both men were found guilty. The trial judge deferred pronouncing sentence for a week to enable lawyers of the two men to prepare submissions to him which might be used in an appeal to the Supreme Court of Malaysia, and to hear submissions on behalf of Barlow that he should be allowed to return to Australia immediately for an operation on his leg. The prosecutors surmised that as they had arrived, stayed, and were leaving together, they had a common purpose of trafficking drugs.

On 1 August 1985 Barlow and Chambers attended their sentencing hearing to learn they had received the death sentence by hanging.

Police and legal sources confirmed that Chambers at least was the victim of an informer. Prior to his arrest three or four Penang drug dealers had been detained and interrogated about Chambers's movements. The informers' evidence was kept secret at the trial. The drug habits of Barlow and Chambers were likewise not mentioned at the trial as it would have prejudiced their cases, and exposed the heroin trade inside Malaysian prisons.

== Appeal ==
They sought an appeal against the original sentence on the grounds that the original trial judge had drawn unwarranted inferences from circumstantial evidence and had erred on several points. Other arguments of the appeal revolved around the credibility of the arresting officer's testimony, and questions of whether Barlow and Chambers acted with a "common purpose" in trafficking in the drugs.

On 15 December 1985 they were transferred to Kuala Lumpur for their appeal to the Malaysian Supreme Court. There they were imprisoned in Pudu Prison. Barlow continued to profess his innocence. Pudu Prison had been built in 1895 to hold about 700. By 1986 it held around 6,000 prisoners, almost 50 of whom were drug dealers sentenced to death.

The hearing of the appeal started on 16 December 1985. Chambers was represented at the appeal by Perth barrister Ron Cannon. Barlow's lawyer Karpal Singh was assisted by Melbourne barrister Frank Galbally at the appeal. Galbally was accompanied by Allen Bartholomew who was the Victorian Chief Prison Psychiatrist. On 16 December a row broke out between Singh and Galbally in the court room and was witnessed by press and court staff. The argument occurred after the judges had adjourned for the day and left the court, and lasted for about five minutes. Galbally had urged Singh to file an additional ground for appeal for their client. Singh had said there was "little point" doing this, as no fresh evidence was involved. Galbally believed Barlow's shivering could be attributed to a spinal injury; however, Singh reasoned that this was already adequately covered by medical evidence at the trial and in the existing appeal. At the appeal, Singh had argued that Barlow's shivering could be attributed to his existing medical condition, or a foreigner's "unease" at being confronted by police. After the argument Singh finally left the room, warning Galbally over his shoulder not to criticise Malaysia's British-based legal system or suggest Australia's was superior. Singh attempted to have Galbally charged with contempt. The day after the row, Galbally was asked for, and submitted, an apology to the court for his words in court.

The appeal court on 18 December 1985 upheld the trial judge's decision to invoke the death penalty because the amount of the drug carried was in excess of the 15-gram (0.53 oz) cut-off point used to distinguish users from traffickers. On death row, Chambers had taken up biblical studies with a Western Catholic Missionary. He broke down and wept in her arms in the dock when three appeals judges upheld the conviction.

Galbally was not in court for the final decision of the appeal; Australian officials reported that he had left Malaysia on the night of 17 December after apologising to the Supreme Court over the row over contempt. After the result was publicised Galbally suggested that Barlow would have been found not guilty had the medical evidence he wanted introduced been admitted by the court. The evidence he wanted heard at the appeal was that Barlow had a nervous shake; the prosecution had used Barlow's shake at the time of his arrest as grounds for his guilt.

After the rejection of the appeal, Australia's Foreign Minister Bill Hayden contacted the Governor of Penang asking that the sentence be commuted to imprisonment on humanitarian grounds. Hayden stated that "I have always been and remain firmly opposed to capital punishment, and accordingly I will be pressing the presentation of this appeal for clemency with a great sense of urgency."

Through the ordeal of Barlow and Chambers, their mothers, Sue Chambers and Barbara Barlow, publicly supported the defence of innocence. However, in a joint letter to the Yang di-Pertuan Agong (Malaysian head of state) Sultan Iskandar pleading for their lives, they acknowledged their sons' guilt, saying they "regretted their wrongdoing."

== Execution ==
Barlow and Chambers were hanged in Pudu Prison on 7 July 1986. The executioner was Rajendran Kuppasamy, who retired later that year. Kevin Barlow's mother Barbara Barlow reportedly prepared a suicide potion for her son to enable him to evade death by hanging. She prepared the mixture of 75 sleeping tablets dissolved in gin, whisky and brandy in her hotel room and smuggled it into the prison in a small plastic bottle concealed in her handbag. However, fearing her son would use it before all avenues of appeal had been exhausted she made the last-minute decision to keep the secret solution to herself.

== Political statements ==
Malaysia had introduced the death penalty for drug trafficking in 1983 as a reaction to a burgeoning drug trade in the region. By mid 1986 Malaysia had hanged about 35 people in ten years, mostly Chinese Malaysians convicted of drug trafficking. Lawyers and government officials reportedly agreed that the country risked a political and ethnic outcry if it made exceptions based on the ethnicity of its defendants. As Australian public support for Barlow and Chambers was minimal, Malaysia risked little diplomatic damage from carrying out the execution.

Australian Prime Minister Bob Hawke made a passionate plea for a stay of execution on behalf of the two men.

Hawke later described the hanging as "barbaric", a remark which chilled Australian relations with Malaysia. Relations between the two nations were reportedly affected for a decade afterwards. In response to the argument that no one has the right to take another's life, then-Malaysian Prime Minister Mahathir Mohamad replied, "You should tell that to the drug traffickers."

At a press conference that was held after the hangings Mahathir criticised the use of the word "barbaric" and said it should not have been used to refer to Malaysia because "we have never had any lynchings and things like that which only barbarians like to do." He also said that hanging as a method of executing criminals originated in the West.

The then UMNO Youth Leader Anwar Ibrahim also said use of the term "barbaric" was regrettable. He said "It is a generative word that passes judgement on our society—something we cannot accept and did not expect from such a friendly country." He argued that the consequences of drug trafficking were well known in Malaysia, and the need for strong deterrents to eliminate the activity was accepted internationally. The conference of State Legislative Assembly speakers in Shah Alam also rejected Hawke's comment. They said it gave the impression Australia belittled Malaysian law and "considers the capital punishment meted out to the two as uncivilised and unsuitable for this day and age." The speakers at the conference unanimously passed an emergency resolution expressing their "grave view" of the statement. The conference felt that such comments should not have come from a national leader who upheld the law and that the statement had touched on the sovereignty of Malaysia's laws and the legal system.

== Aftermath ==
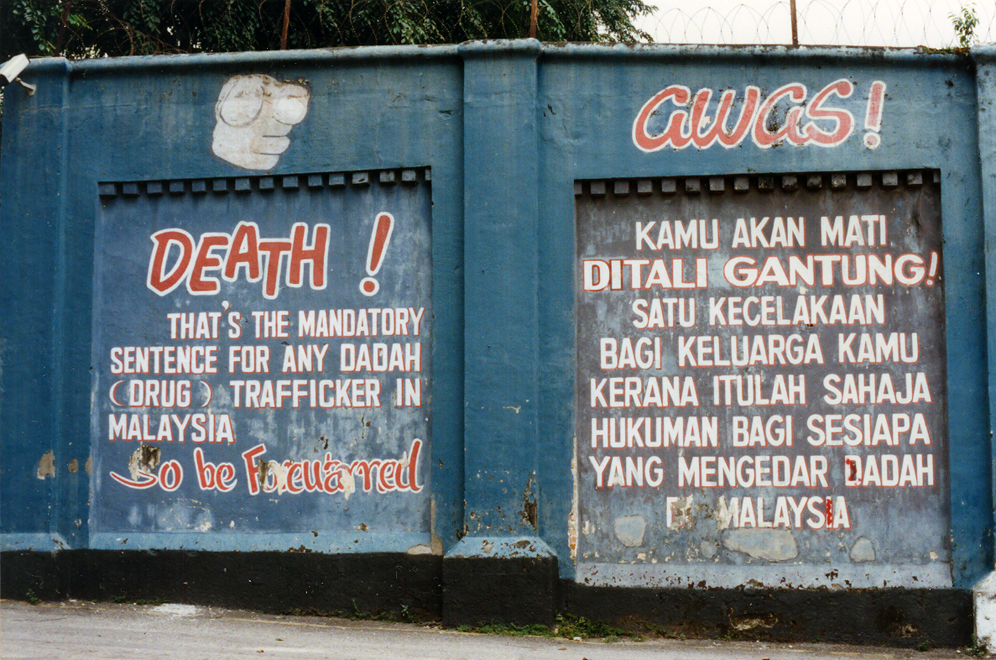
Warning painted on the walls of Pudu Prison, 1999

After their sentencing an investigative trip by Detective Sergeant Carl Mengler of the National Crime Authority of Australia had included interviews with various Australians imprisoned in South East Asia for drug trafficking. Chambers had refused to meet him but Barlow gave information about the planning of the trip; however, he knew only sketchy details of the organisers. This meeting took place in January 1986. The information Barlow gave to Mengler during this interview was later corroborated by Debbie Colyer-Long.

Australian Federal Police denied that they had tipped off Malaysian Police about the claims made by Trevor Lawson.

In June 1988 in Perth, Western Australia, John Asciak was found guilty of conspiring with Barlow and Chambers to import 179 grams of heroin. He had been implicated by Barlow when he was interviewed in prison by the National Crime Authority of Australia in 1986. The court heard Asciak recruited Barlow, who he knew had financial problems, and offered him $6,000 to conduct the drug run. Barlow was later introduced to Chambers in Perth. Asciak, who denied the charges, was found guilty and sentenced to ten years in prison.

== Dramatisations ==
- A four-hour television mini-series was released in 1988 entitled Barlow and Chambers: A Long Way From Home (Dadah is Death). It stars Hugo Weaving as Geoffrey Chambers and John Polson as Kevin Barlow.
- A BBC drama, produced by Richard Langridge and directed by Jane Howell, was made on a script by Michael Wall which followed the story closely and was transmitted on BBC2 in 1991 entitled Amongst Barbarians.
- A 2004 Canadian movie, Manners Of Dying, follows the short story of that name by Yann Martel (Man Booker Prize winner) published in 1993, directed by Jeremy Peter Allen, refers to the executions through the name of its main character, Kevin Barlow.

== See also ==
- Derrick Gregory
- Michael McAuliffe
- List of Australian criminals
- List of Australians imprisoned or executed abroad
- Ronald Ryan
- Van Tuong Nguyen

== Bibliography ==
- Williams, David (1989). This Little Piggy Stayed Home: Barlow, Chambers and the Mafia. Perth, Western Australia: Panorama Books. ISBN 0-949864-21-8.
- West Australian newspaper: -Transferred to death row, Penang jail (August 1985) and await news of their appeal for clemency (Nov. 1985 - June 1986. 6 Nov. 1985, p. 33; 15 Nov. 1985, p. 33; 18 Nov. 1985, p. 43; 25 Nov. 1985, p. 14; 14 Jan. 1986, p. 11; 11 Feb. 1986, p. 24; 5 June 1986, p. 20; 19 June 1986, p. 1.
- West Australian newspaper: The sentences of capital punishment (21 December 1985). Editorial on the death penalty and heroin trading (Dec. 1985), summaries of events (June 1986), their hanging in Kuala Lumpur (7 July 1986) and their involvement in organised drug smuggling (July 1986).
- West Australian newspaper: 23 June 1986, pp. 1–9 - summary of case. (They are hanged 7 July 1986). 21 Dec. 1985, p. 8; 23 June 1986, p. 1–9; 8 July 1986, p. 1–2; 9 July 1986, p. 10; 7 May 1987, p. 1
