= Murder of Laura Yap Fui Kheng =

1981 murder of a former beauty queen in Malaysia

Laura Yap Fui Kheng
- Laura Yap Fui Kheng, who was found murdered in 1981
- Born: Laura Yap Fui Kheng; 1956; Malaysia
- Died: 4 May 1981 (aged 25); Petaling Jaya, Selangor, Malaysia
- Cause of death: Strangulation
- Occupation: Air hostess (former)
- Known for: Her murder
- Parents: Yap Kooi Hee (father); Fong May Ha (mother)

On 4 May 1981, 25-year-old Laura Yap Fui Kheng (叶慧琼 Yè Huìqióng), an air hostess and former beauty queen, was found murdered in her home at Petaling Jaya in Selangor, Malaysia. About two days after the murder, 21-year-old air conditioner repairman Lee Chee Wai (李志伟 Lǐ Zhìwěi) was arrested and charged with murder. Evidence adduced during the trial showed that Lee had entered Yap's house on the excuse of wanting to repair her air conditioner, and he had strangled her to death while attempting to rape Yap. Lee was found guilty of murdering Yap and sentenced to death in October 1982. Lee's appeal was dismissed, and he was hanged on 18 January 1984.

== Murder ==
On 4 May 1981, a 25-year-old woman was found strangled to death in her home at Petaling Jaya in Selangor, Malaysia.

The victim, 25-year-old Laura Yap Fui Kheng, was discovered dead in the living room by her mother, wearing only a shirt and underpants, and a piece of rope was tightly tied around her neck. At the time of her death, Yap, the third of four daughters and one son in her family, was working as an air hostess and she formerly was a beauty queen who represented Pahang in a beauty contest in 1977. Yap's neighbours, who heard about her death, told police that they heard loud sounds and screams coming from Yap's house, but did not do anything since they assumed it was a family dispute, and afterwards, they witnessed a man rushing out of the house and fleeing on a motorcycle.

An autopsy report showed that Yap had died as a result of strangulation, and there was no dispute that Yap was likely attacked and killed during a rape attempt by her killer, although this attempt was likely not successful since the clothes were still intact. The police, having classified Yap's death as murder, appealed for the whereabouts of the man, whom they classified as a prime suspect behind the murder of Laura Yap, and also publicized the description of the man last seen outside Yap's house before the murder. As the man was said to have scratch wounds on his face based on the sightings provided by witnesses, the medical institutions were also informed by police to report any patients that matched the description of the suspect and had scratch wounds on the neck.

On 7 May 1981, the Royal Malaysia Police arrested a man at Kuala Lumpur and managed to link him to the murder of Yap. On 12 May 1981, the suspect, identified as 21-year-old Lee Chee Wai, was officially charged with murder in a magistrate's court, before he was detained at Pudu Prison while assisting in investigations and awaiting trial. At the time of his arrest, Lee was working as an air conditioner technician and he was married with a two-year-old daughter. Lee pleaded not guilty to the murder charge.

On 9 July 1981, a series of preliminary hearings concluded that Lee should stand trial for murder at the High Court on a later date.

== Trial of Lee Chee Wai ==
Lee Chee Wai
- Born: c. September 1959; Malaysia
- Died: 18 January 1984 (aged 24); Pudu Prison, Kuala Lumpur, Selangor, Malaysia
- Cause of death: Execution by hanging
- Other name: Ah Wai
- Status: Executed
- Conviction: Murder (one count)
- Penalty: Death penalty

Details
- Victims: Laura Yap Fui Kheng (deceased)
- Date: 4 May 1981
- Country: Malaysia
- State: Selangor
- Date apprehended: 7 May 1981

On 13 October 1982, 23-year-old Lee Chee Wai stood trial at the Kuala Lumpur High Court for the murder of Laura Yap Fui Kheng, where his trial was presided over by a single judge – Justice Mohamed Dzaiddin Abdullah – and a jury of seven members. Under the previous laws of Malaysia before the 1995 abolition of jury trials, should the jury found him guilty of murder, either by a majority or unanimous decision, Lee would be sentenced to the mandatory death penalty under Section 302 of the Malaysian Penal Code. Lee was represented by K. Pasupathy while the prosecution was led by Deputy Public Prosecutor (DPP) Muhammad Shafee Abdullah.

The trial court was told during the preliminary hearing and trial that Lee, then working as an air conditioner repairman, had allegedly observed Yap's movements, and seeing that Yap's mother stepped out of the house, Lee approached her and asked if she needed help to fix her air conditioner. However, Yap's mother declined his offer and said that his services were not required, and hence she drove off to town, leaving Yap alone at home. Lee proceeded to enter the house and approached Yap, asking if she wanted to have some maintenance of her air conditioner, and successfully persuaded her into allowing him to enter the house. Afterwards, while he was fixing the air conditioner, Lee took the chance to attack Yap, attempting to molest and rape the young woman, who resisted his advances. During the course of the rape attempt, Lee tied a rope around Yap's neck and strangled her to death.

Forensic evidence presented at the trial showed that while Yap was not raped, there were stains of semen found on her clothes, and the bruises on her neck, face and four limbs corroborated that she had been strangled during the course of a sexual assault. A 14-year-old student and Yap's neighbour testified that he had seen a man in a blue shirt, whom he later identified as Lee, rushing out of the house and riding away on his motorcycle. The boy testified that he earlier witnessed Lee inside the house, seemingly struggling with someone, and after Lee's departure, he peered through the wall and saw Yap lying motionless, and he failed to get her awake even after calling her several times. A doctor also testified that when he checked Lee's body, he found scratch marks on Lee's hand, arm and neck, which he determined to have been inflicted within a period of one to five days. A female neighbour also testified that she saw a man strangling a woman inside Yap's house.

Yap's brother, the only son of his family, told the court that in April 1981, a month before Yap's murder, he encountered Lee twice, who asked him a couple of times if he needed to repair his air conditioner, but he rejected him each and every time, as he sensed something amiss. Yap's mother had earlier gave her statement that when she found her daughter's dead body, she rushed in to try remove the rope around Yap's neck and resuscitated her to no avail, and even tried using a pair of scissors to cut the rope. One of the police officers, who arrested Lee two days after the killing, testified that when he caught Lee, he asked him about the scratch wounds, and Lee claimed they were inflicted by his wife during an argument. The officer also told the court that since the murder scene had a connection to air conditioners at the house (which were tampered with), the investigations focused on the nearby companies in charge of repairing air conditioners, and with the additional clue of the registration number of Lee's motorcycle, the police were able to capture Lee.

In the midst of the trial, Lee alleged that he did not voluntarily make his statements during police interrogation, as the police officers physically assaulted him during the questioning. However, Lee's confession was admitted by the court as evidence, after his allegations were dismissed by the court.

When he was ordered to enter his defence, Lee denied that he tried to rape Yap or intentionally killed her. Lee's version of events was that after he entered the house, he helped Yap to repair the air conditioner, and previously, he had gone to the house for at least two to three times in the past to help the Yap family repair the air conditioner. Lee said that he tried to extort a repair fee of RM15 from Yap, who mistook him for wanting to rob her, and she called for help, and it caused him to chase after her as Yap went down the stairs and continued calling for help. Lee said he grabbed a rope in order to tie up Yap's hand once he caught up with her, and by the time he did, Yap already reached the bottom of the stairs, but she accidentally lost her balance and while she was falling, Lee claimed he accidentally looped the rope around Yap's neck and hand, which led to the "accidental" death of Yap by strangulation.

In response, the prosecution rebutted that Lee's defence should not be accepted, as the evidence clearly demonstrated that Lee had attempted to molest and rape Yap, and when that did not succeed, he resorted to lethal violence and murdered Yap in order to silence her and cover up his insidious conduct. As such, the prosecution urged the jury and judge to convict Lee of murder. At the end of closing submissions on both sides, the trial judge summed up the case for the jury, and directed them to consider crucial parts of the evidence before reaching a verdict, mainly on the points of whether Lee had the intention to strangle Yap, whether the injuries were caused by Lee himself and Yap's cause of death in order to decide if he was guilty of murder. The judgement was scheduled to be given on 27 October 1982.

On 27 October 1982, after deliberating the case for three hours and 40 minutes, the jury returned with a verdict, and by a majority decision of six to one, the jury found 23-year-old Lee Chee Wai guilty of murder, and recommended the mandatory death sentence. Justice Dzaiddin, who agreed with the jury's findings, concurred with the jury and therefore convicted Lee as charged, and sentenced him to death by hanging. Lee was reportedly calm during sentencing but teared up while leaving the courtroom, and he was subsequently transferred to the death row section of Pudu Prison. Lee's defence counsel later confirmed on that same day that they would appeal against Lee's conviction.

== Execution ==
After he was sentenced to hang, Lee Chee Wai filed an appeal to the Federal Court of Malaysia, with prominent lawyer Karpal Singh arguing Lee's appeal before the court's three-member bench; Singh argued over the validity of Lee's statements and added that the judge had erroneously directed the jury in reaching the verdict during his summing up of Lee's case. However, on 21 March 1983, the Federal Court dismissed Lee's appeal after finding his conviction of murder safe and confirmed the death penalty in his case. Lee subsequently petitioned for a royal pardon from the state pardon board, with hopes of commuting his death sentence to life imprisonment, but his death row plea for clemency was denied in December 1983.

On 18 January 1984, 24-year-old Lee Chee Wai was hanged in Pudu Prison at dawn. His body was sent to the mortuary at Kuala Lumpur Hospital, where his brother reclaimed and identified his body for funeral preparations.

== See also ==
- Capital punishment in Malaysia
