= Pudu Prison =

Colonial-era prison in Malaysia

Coordinates: 3.140773°N 101.708443°E

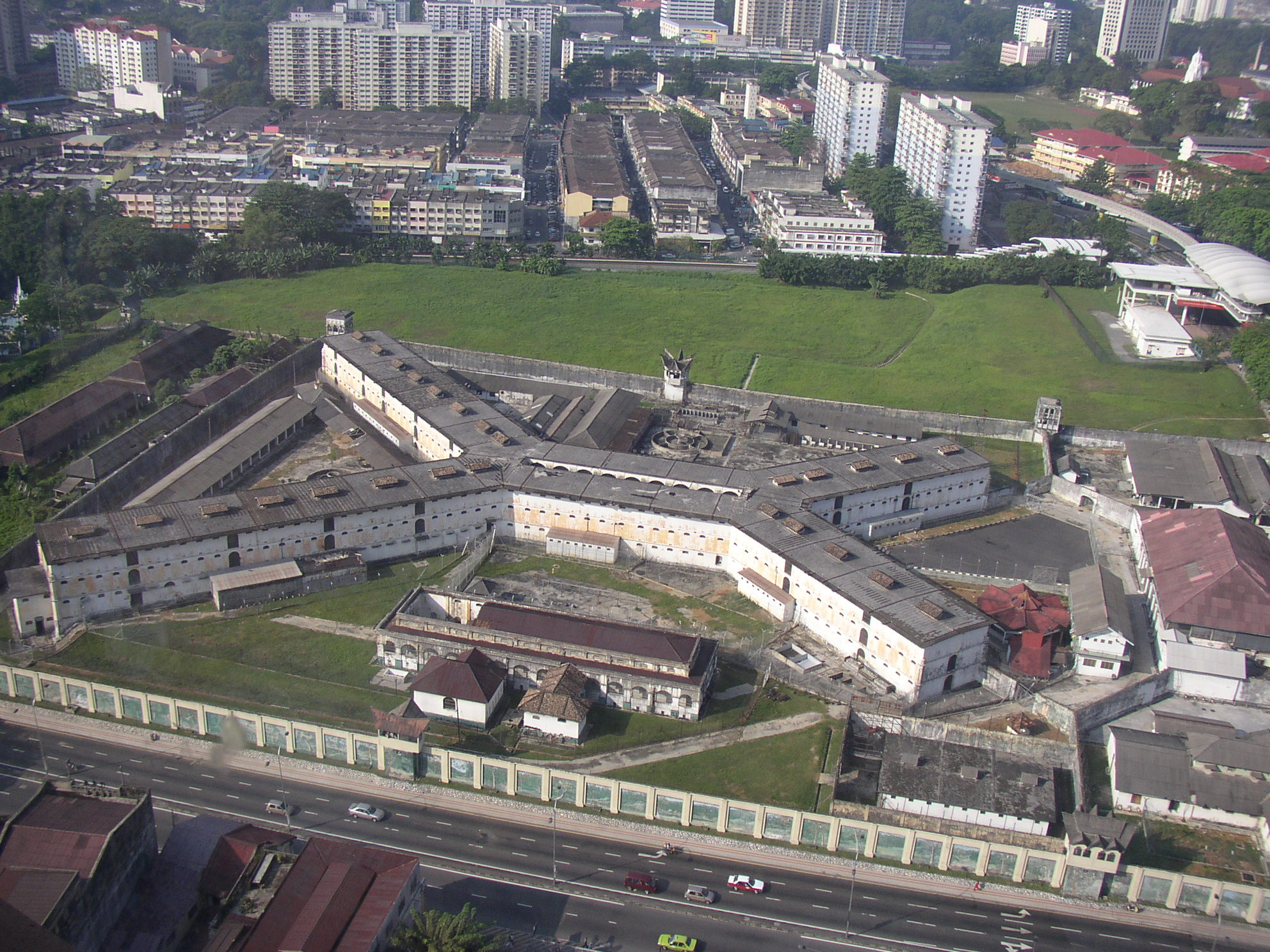
- An overhead view of the Pudu Prison complex, as seen from Berjaya Times Square, in 2004
- Interactive map of Pudu Prison
- Location: Jalan Hang Tuah, Kuala Lumpur, Malaysia
- Status: Demolished (redeveloped as Bukit Bintang City Centre)
- Security class: Medium-security
- Opened: 1895
- Closed: 1996 (Malaysian Prison Department); 2008 (Royal Malaysian Police)
- Managed by: Malaysian Prison Department (1895–1996) Royal Malaysian Police (2003–2008)

Pudu Prison (Malay: Penjara Pudu), also known as Pudu Jail or Pudu Gaol, was a prison in Kuala Lumpur, Malaysia. Built in phases by the British colonial government between 1891 and 1895, it was located along Jalan Shaw (now Jalan Hang Tuah). The construction began with its 394-metre prison wall at a cost of 16,000 Straits dollars. The wall, at one point in its history, was adorned with the world's longest mural.

The prison complex was largely demolished by December 2012 to make way for urban development. At the request of heritage conservationists and the public, the main gate and a portion of the exterior wall have been preserved and now form part of the park surrounding the Bukit Bintang City Centre development and mall, which occupies the site of the former prison.

== History ==
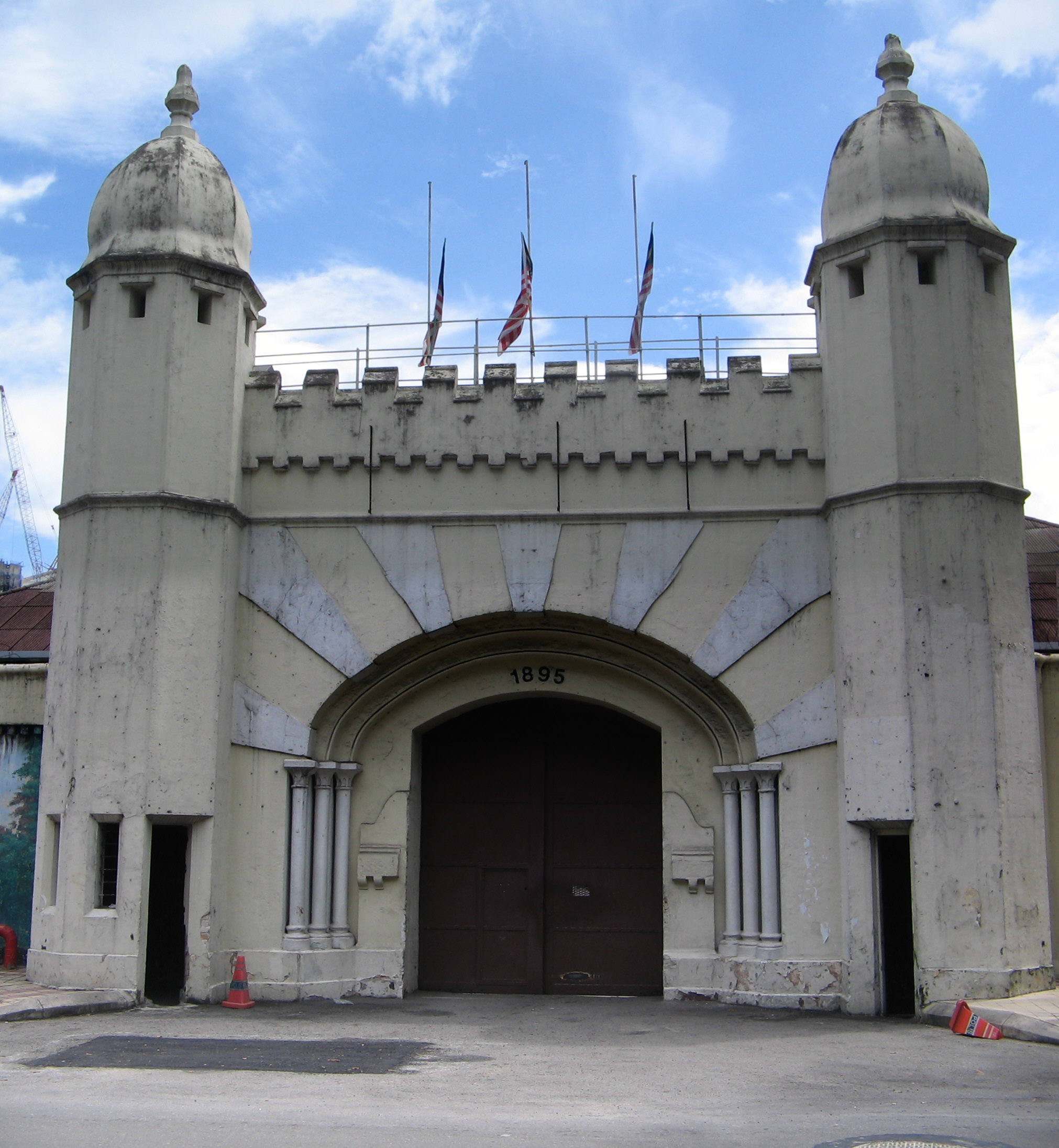
The main gate of Pudu Prison, 2007. The gate has been preserved and forms part of a public park on the grounds of the Bukit Bintang City Centre.

=== Building ===
Pudu Prison was built on the site of a former Chinese cemetery. The site was chosen because Pudu was a dense jungle at the time, with Malayan tigers occasionally roaming around, and it also because at the time it was close to Kuala Lumpur's central business district (about one mile from the Sultan Abdul Samad Building) yet sufficiently isolated. Charles Edwin Spooner, the head of Selangor's Public Works Department, was the architect and project manager. The prison was built at a cost of 138,000 Straits dollars.

Construction began in 1891, with convicts serving as the labourers. The cemetery was excavated and the remains from 500 graves were relocated to other cemeteries. Prisoners were transferred to the partially built prison in stages throughout the construction period from 1892 to 1895. While the prison's main block was only half-constructed, about 500 inmates from other smaller jails throughout Kuala Lumpur were relocated to Pudu Jail in May 1895. The first governor of Pudu Prison was Lieutenant-Colonel J.A.B. Ellen.

=== Epidemic ===
From 1893 to 1895, an outbreak of cholera and dysentery struck the prison and killed a number of inmates. The epidemic peaked in August 1895, coinciding with an unusually dry weather, resulting in 126 recorded cases, including 68 fatalities in that month alone.

The epidemic was blamed on the prison's water supply, which was sourced from a well built over the former burial grounds. The well's water was also contaminated by effluent from a vegetable garden in a nearby village. The epidemic was brought under control by the end of August 1895 when fresh water was sourced from reservoirs in Ampang.

Outbreaks of beriberi had also plagued the prison during its first decade in operation, and this was followed by a malaria outbreak in 1908.

=== Early years ===
In 1911, Richard Alfred Ernest Clark, a former soldier of the third battalion of the Middlesex Regiment, was one of the European warders at Pudu Prison.

Early in its history, Pudu Prison was the only prison in Selangor for incarcerating male and female convicts serving short sentences. The prison was also self-sufficient as it had a vegetable garden that could produce enough food for its inmates annually.

The prison later housed convicts who had committed more serious crimes, including drug traffickers and murderers. Capital punishment, in the form of long-drop hanging, was done in an execution chamber in Block D, where death row inmates were held. Corporal punishment, in the form of whipping with a rotan, was also carried out in a designated courtyard on the prison grounds.

=== World War II and later ===
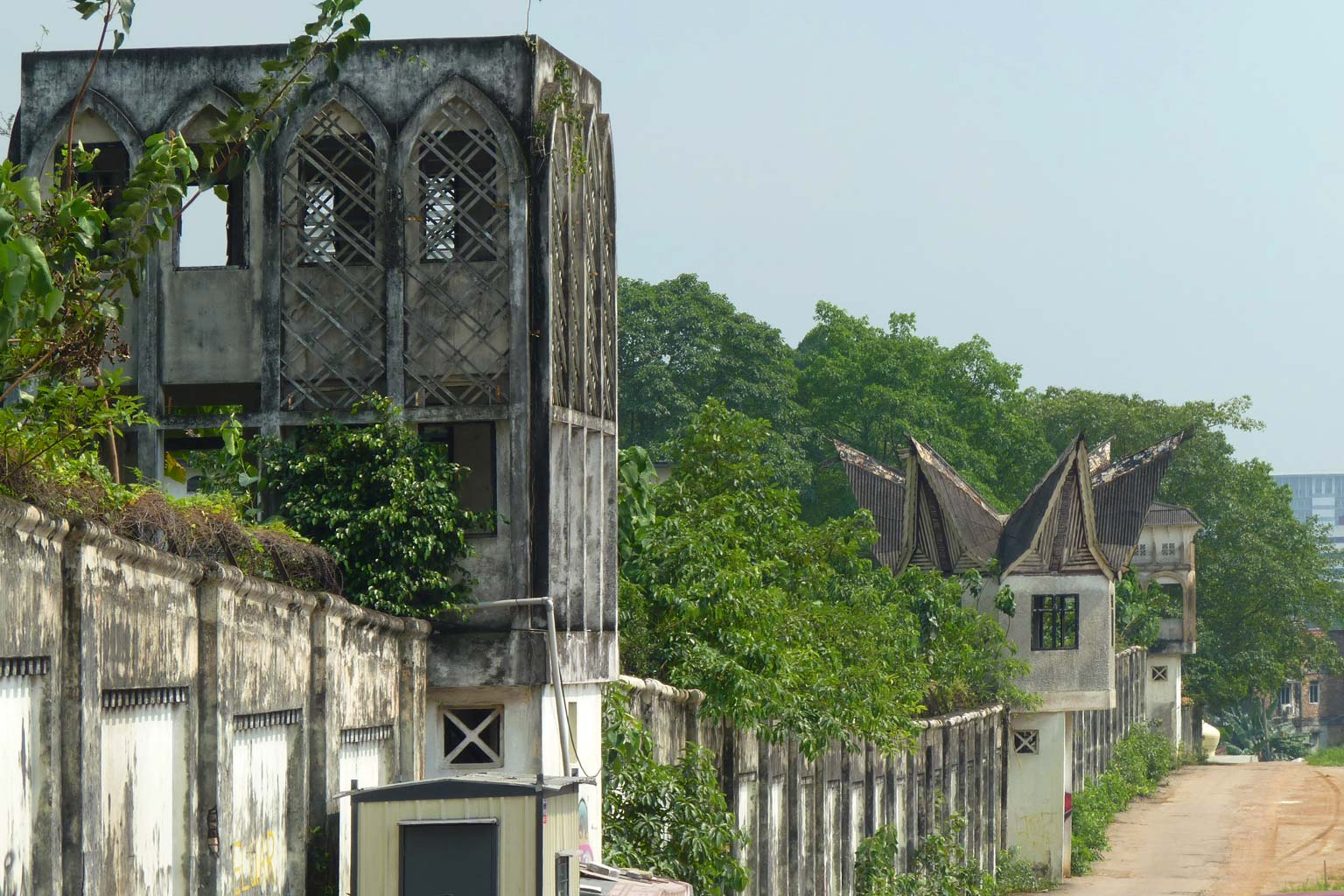
Overgrown west wall of Pudu Prison in February 2011.

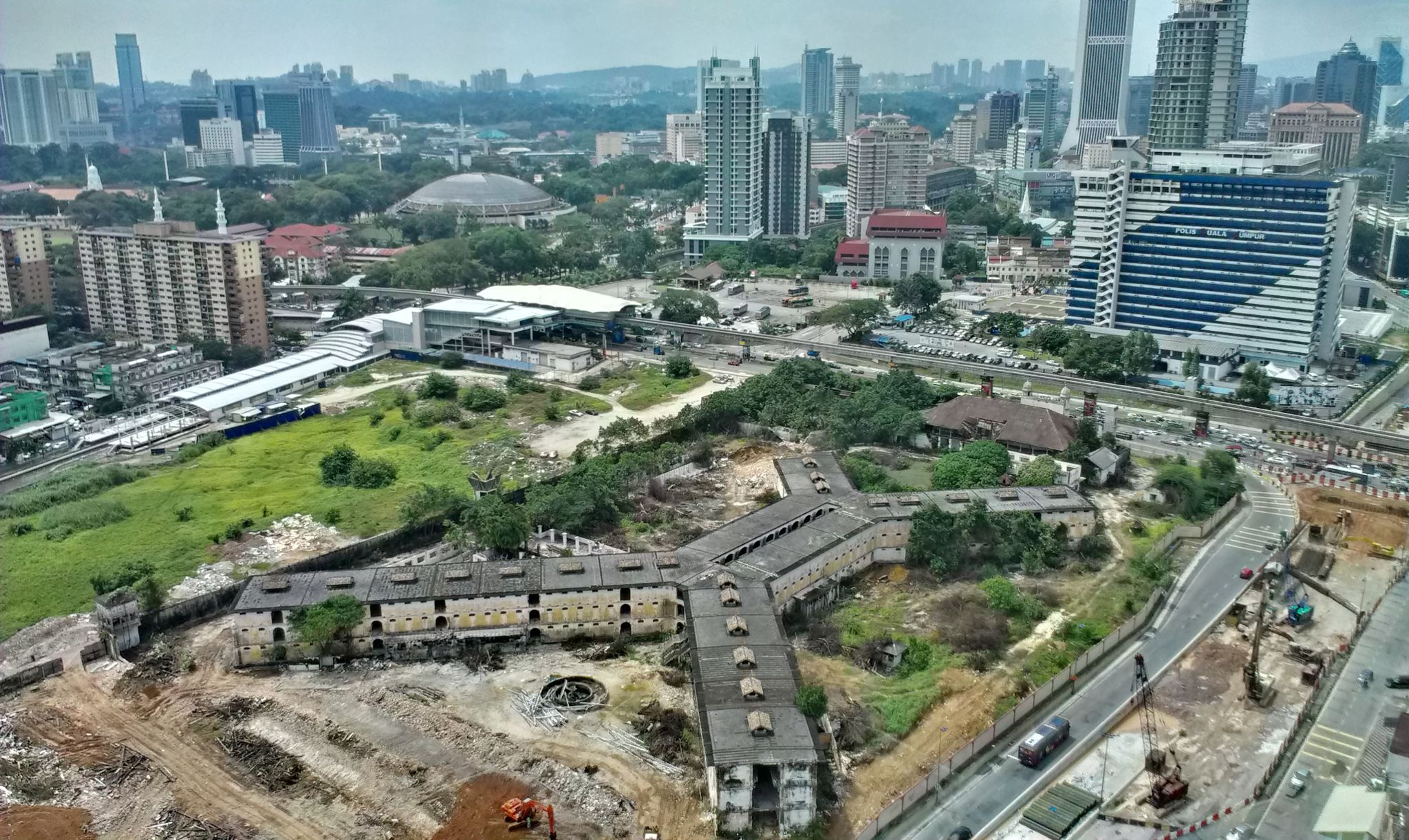
As of October 2012, parts of Pudu Prison which sitting next to Jalan Pudu has been demolished.

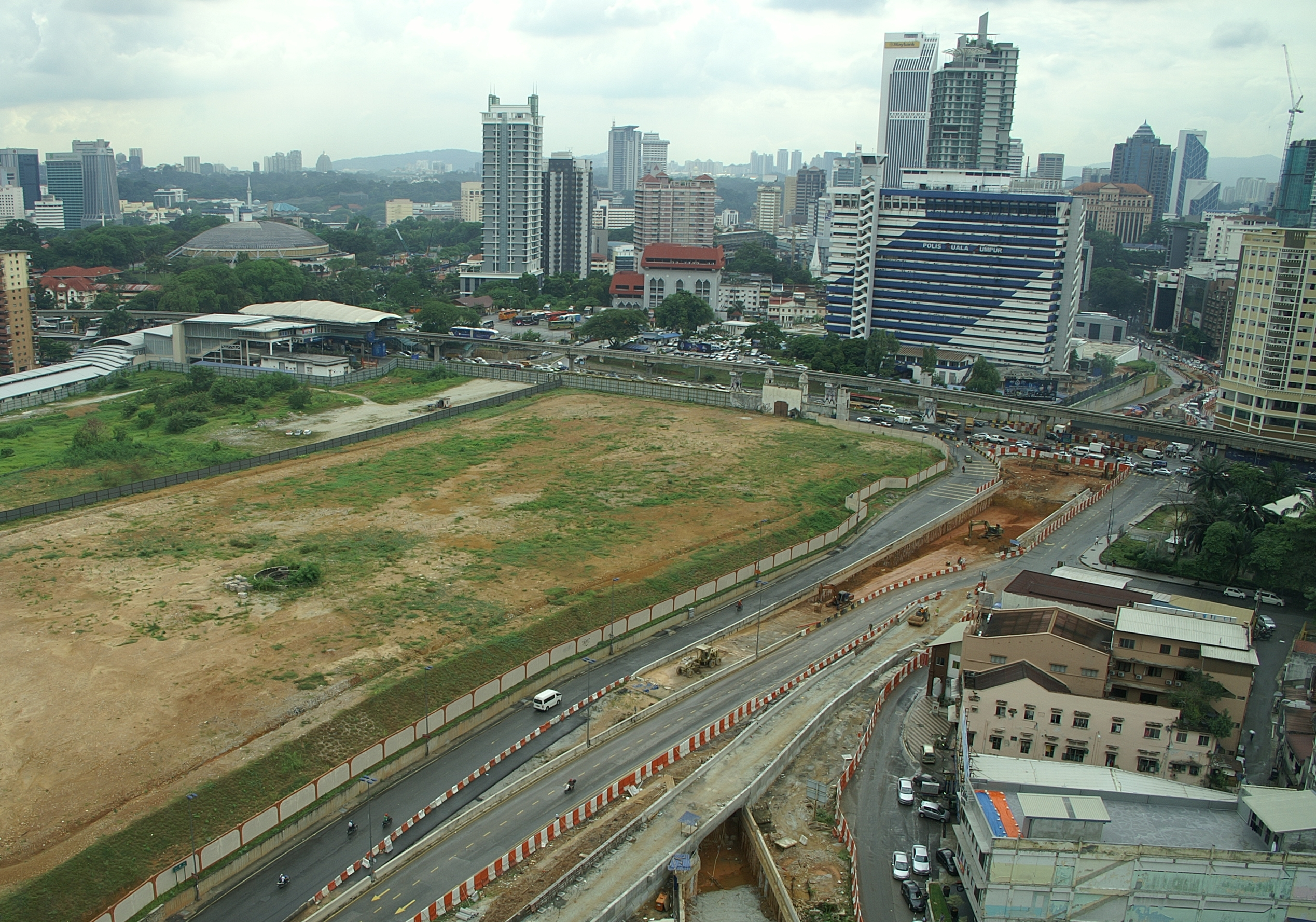
The area of the prison in June 2013, with the entrance gate and a water fountain remaining.

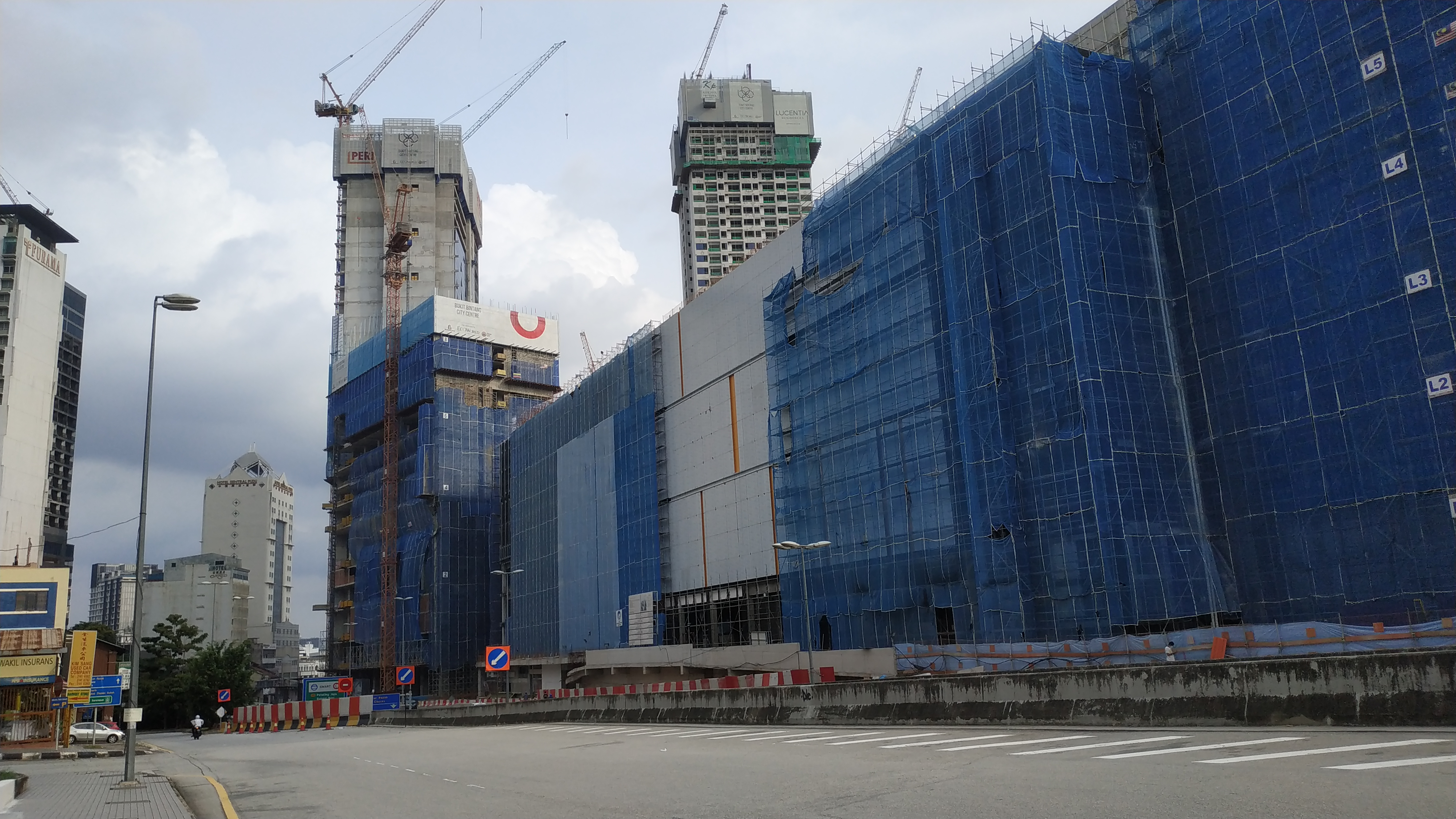
The Bukit Bintang City Centre, built on the grounds of the prison, under construction in May 2020.

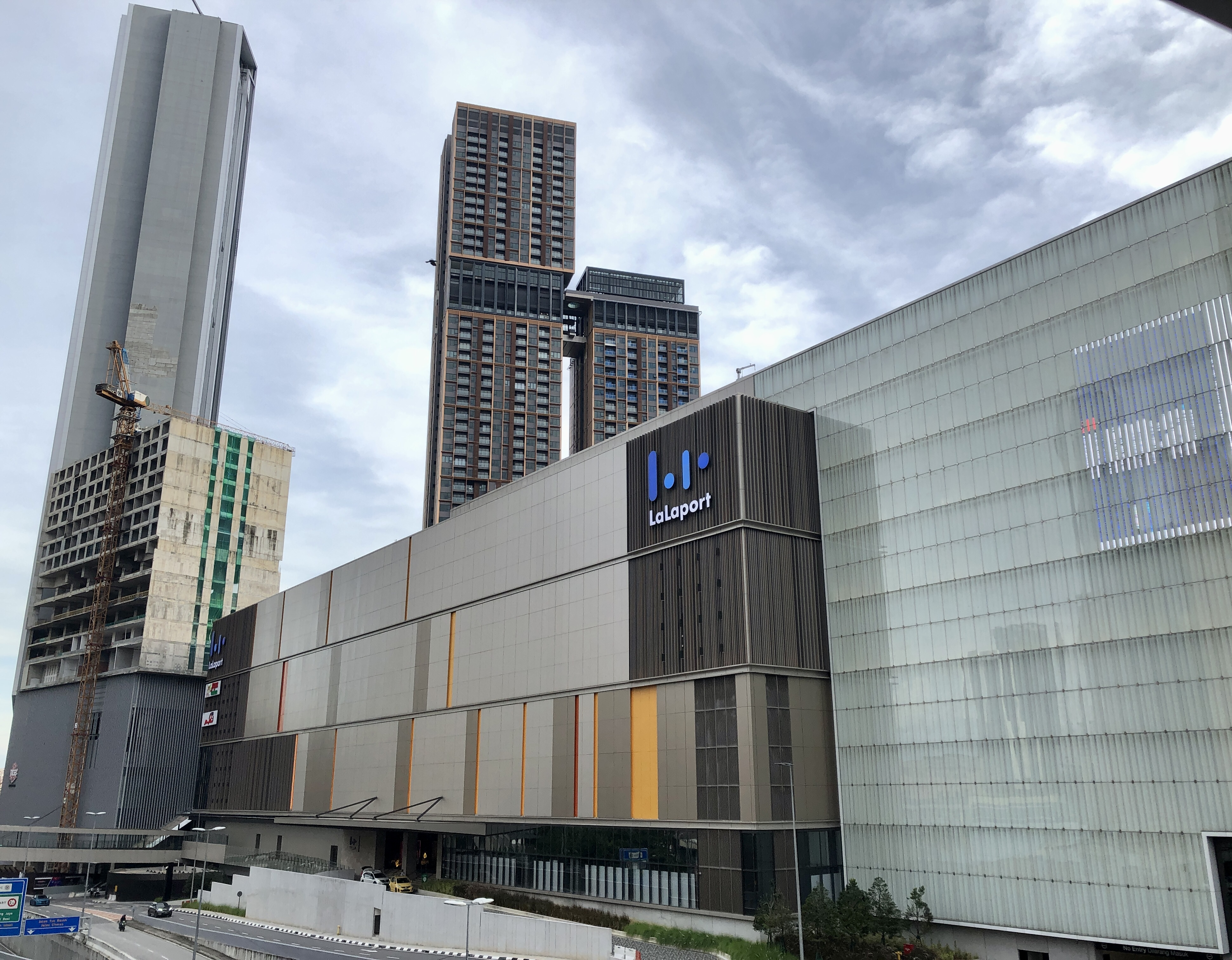
The Bukit Bintang City Centre in May 2022.

During World War II, the prison was briefly used by the Japanese as a prisoner-of-war (POW) camp from January to October 1942, after which most of the POWs were transferred to Changi Prison in Singapore. Over 1,000 POWs were held there in mid-1942.

In 1986, a group of prisoners led by Jimmy Chua Chap Seng seized and held two members of the prison staff as hostages over a period of six days. The siege was resolved when Malaysian police stormed the prison, successfully rescuing the hostages and subduing the prisoners without any casualties. Chua was hanged for another crime he was detained for in Pudu Prison while the rest were jailed for wrongful confinement and abduction.

In the 1990s, concerns were raised about the viability of the prison's location on prime real estate in Kuala Lumpur. Security was a major issue due to the prison's proximity to fast-rising commercial developments such as Bukit Bintang. Additionally, the prison layout and facilities had become obsolete.

In 1996, after 101 years of operating as a prison, Pudu Prison was formally closed and the inmates were moved to Sungai Buloh Prison and Kajang Prison. It continued to be used until 2009 as a day-holding facility for prisoners attending court hearings. It was also briefly opened to the public as a museum in 1997. In 2007, eight supporters of the Hindu Rights Action Force were arrested and incarcerated in Pudu Prison following the 2007 HINDRAF rally. They were later released due to lack of evidence.

=== Demolition ===
In June 2009, the Malaysian government decided to demolish the prison complex in phases. When Fong Kui Lun (DAP), the Member of Parliament for Bukit Bintang, asked why the building was not being retained as part of Malaysia's heritage, Deputy Finance Minister Awang Adek Hussain (UMNO-BN) replied, "In our opinion, it's not something to be proud of." The execution chamber, along with the prison hospital, were the first structures to be torn down in October that year.

In June 2010, the eastern wall of Pudu Prison was demolished to make way for a road-widening project. By December 2012, all buildings within Pudu Prison were completely demolished. The government agreed to maintain a part of the exterior wall and the main gate after being petitioned by conservationists and the general public. These remaining features have been incorporated into the fountain park forming part of Mitsui Lalaport Mall, which now occupies the site of the prison.

The site was redeveloped by the BBCC Development Sdn Bhd, a joint venture between EcoWorld, UDA and EPF Board, into the Bukit Bintang City Centre (BBCC). In 2022, BBCC was officially opened. The main reason Pudu Prison was closed by the British is because the prison can not fit all the prisoner anymore. All prisoners were relocated to the Penjara Kajang by batch.

== Mural ==
In 1984, an inmate, Khong Yen Chong, and others used around 2,000 litres of paint to create a mural of tropical scenes. It measured about 860 feet by 14 feet and was mentioned in the Guinness Book of Records as the longest mural in the world. After serving his sentence, Khong returned to the prison as a volunteer to complete the mural. Khong died on 20 February 2026 at the age of 78.

== Notable inmates ==
- Lee Chee Wai was hanged on 18 January 1984 in Pudu Prison for the 1981 murder of Laura Yap Fui Kheng.
- Wong Swee Chin, better known as Botak Chin, was hanged in Pudu Prison on 11 June 1981 for possession of firearms.
- Leonard Glenn Francis, a key figure in the "Fat Leonard" corruption scandal, was interned in Pudu Prison in the 1980s.
- In 1986, Australians Kevin Barlow and Brian Chambers were hanged in Pudu Prison for heroin trafficking.
- Jimmy Chua Chap Seng, the mastermind of the 1986 Pudu Prison siege, was found guilty of illegal possession of firearms and ammunition under the Internal Security Act 1960, and hanged in Pudu Prison on 10 October 1989 after losing his appeal against the death sentence.

== Artifacts ==
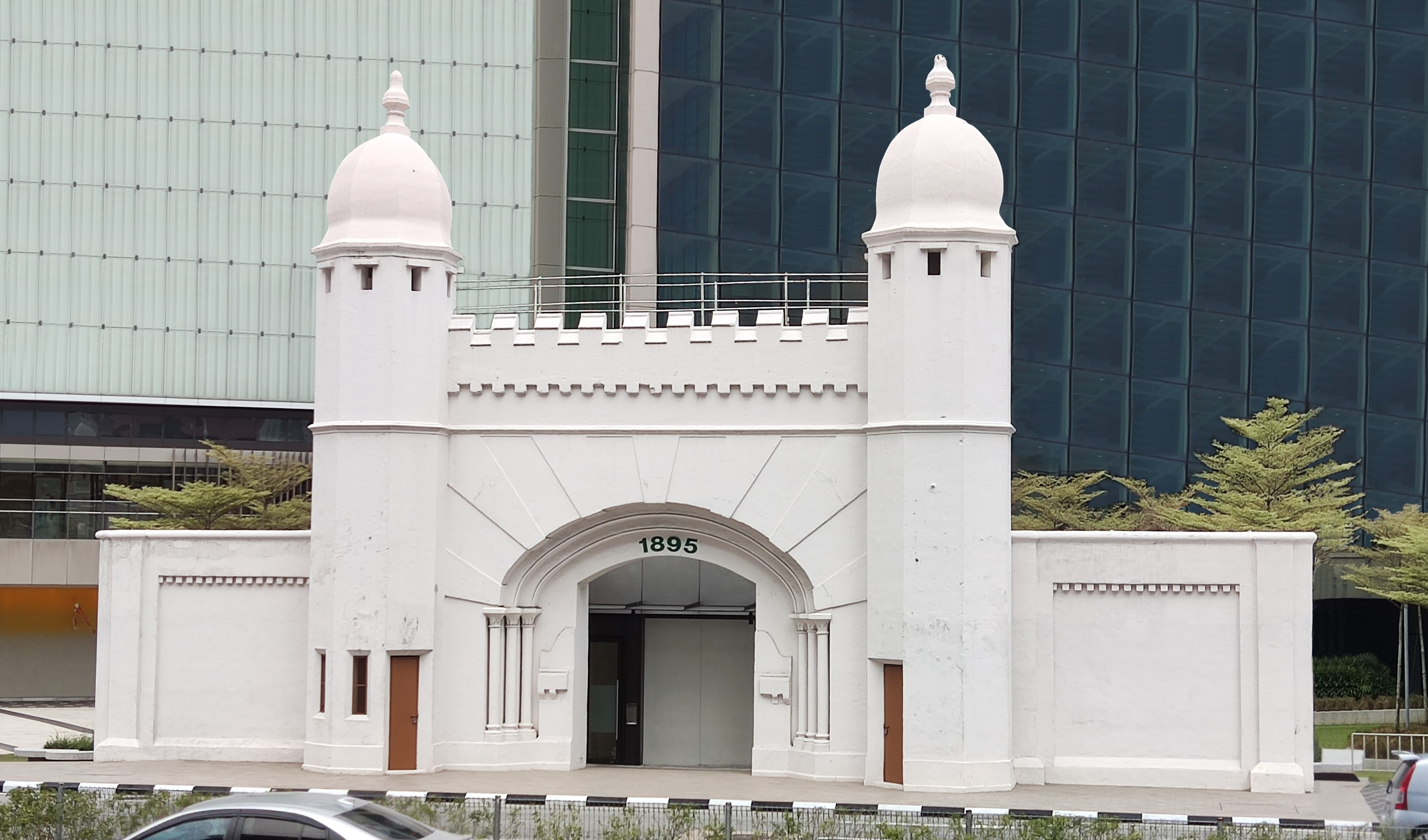
Pudu Prison's front gate, preserved as a memorial, August 2023

Some artifacts from the prison, including the fountain and the gable inscribed with the year "1895", were preserved and exhibited at the Malaysia Prison Museum in Bandar Hilir, Malacca; the museum itself being a former colonial prison opened in 1860.
