= David Williams (journalist) =

David Williams is an author, journalist and theologian, based in New Zealand.

He gained notoriety following the publication of his 1989 account of the failed drug run and subsequent execution of Australian drug runners, Kevin Barlow and Geoffrey Chambers. Titled This Little Piggy Stayed Home: Barlow, Chambers and the Mafia the book was one of the more controversial publications of Panorama Books. The book was never printed again following its initial release, despite continued demand, because of fears of litigation. It caused a stir in the large Italian community based in Western Australia and, for a time, was roundly rejected as an accurate account of the mafia's existence and operation in WA. That changed when famed mafia hunter, Judge Giovanni Falcone, used Williams' book to describe the formation of the mafia in the state around cells of influence. Falcone was assassinated on 23 May 1992, in a massive car bomb attack – not six months following his vindication of Williams' work.

Williams took an extended break from journalism after reporting on the deaths of nine people in the Gracetown cliff collapse in 1996. Gracetown is a small coastal community on the south-west coast of Western Australia, near Margaret River. His piece was the only eyewitness journalistic account of the events following the tragedy, but it was his own involvement in the community effort to recover the bodies from beneath the sand that led to his disenchantment with media.

Williams pursued theological studies for some years and eventually earned a PhD. He took up an academic role at Laidlaw College, in Auckland, New Zealand, where he designed a new counselling degree programme. He left the college after some years and launched his own news magazine.

Williams continues to author books and consults in the areas of communication, human relationships, epistemology and theology, through his consultancy Other Wise. His latest book is on the life and death of Dr Jared Noel, a young Auckland City Hospital surgeon who succumbed to bowel cancer in October 2014. In the five or so years that Jared fought the disease, he wrote a blog about his journey of suffering, faith and hope, which garnered a large following. Williams interviewed Jared almost daily in the final month leading up to his death, and Message to My Girl, told in Jared's voice and from his perspective, is a reflection on a young person's submission to mortality, and an inspirational account of how to approach death with unending hope.

== Bibliography ==
- Williams, D. (1989). This little piggy stayed home : Barlow, Chambers and the Mafia. Perth, W.A. Panorama Books, ISBN 0-949864-21-8
- Williams, D.W. (2008). "New wings for a molting eagle: Isaiah's bold message to exiled Israel." In On Eagles' Wings: An Exploration of Strength in the Midst of Weakness. Eugene: Wipf and Stock, ISBN 978-1-55635-127-3
- Williams, D.W. (2011). "Imaging the triune god in otherness and encounter: A Response to Yael Klangwisan" In Reconsidering gender: Evangelical perspectives (eds. Myk Habets and Beulah Wood). Wipf & Stock.
- Williams, D.W. (2015). "Convergence in joy: A comparison of the devotional lives of C.S. Lewis and 'that dreadful man Karl Barth.'" In A Myth Retold: Re-encountering C. S. Lewis as Theologian (C. S. Lewis Secondary Studies) (ed. Martin Sutherland). Wipf & Stock.
- Williams, D.W & Dr Jared Noel (2015) Message to My Girl: A dying father's powerful legacy of hope. Allen & Unwin.
