= Feminism in Malaysia =

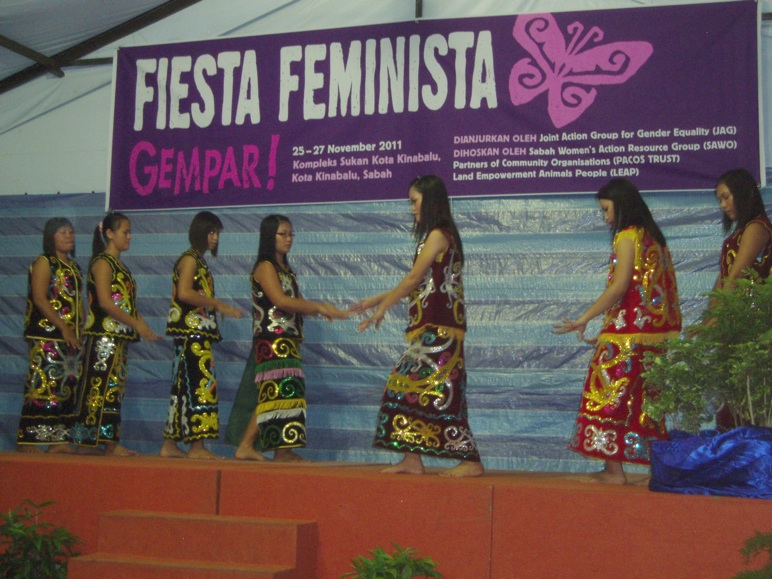
Fiesta Feminista in Kota Kinabalu, Sabah

The feminist movement in Malaysia is a multicultural coalition of women's organisations committed to the end of gender-based discrimination, harassment and violence against women. Having first emerged as women's shelters in the mid 1980s, feminist women's organisations in Malaysia later developed alliances with other social justice movements. Today, the feminist movement in Malaysia is one of the most active actors in the country's civil society.

== History ==
The history of feminist movement in Malaysia, its birth and the usage of the very term 'feminist' are contested. Unlike the history of the feminist movement in Britain and the United States for instance, the struggle for women's rights in Malaysia were not founded on women's right to vote. Like many other postcolonial countries during the fall of the British empire, all Malaysian citizens, both male and female, were granted the right to vote during the country's political independence in 1957.

=== Women's emancipation in colonial Malaya ===
To avoid the anachronism of the term feminist, it may be advisable to chart the history of feminism in Malaysia with the recorded usage and political championing of 'women's liberation' in the early twentieth century. The first documented use of women's liberation or women's emancipation as a political and social project in 1920s Malaya was by Malay Muslim male reformers and writers Syed Syeikh Al-Hadi and Zainal Abidin Ahmad, better known as Za'aba. Although they advocated the education of women and girls as a means to women's emancipation, the Malay Muslim modernists, or kaum muda, stressed the importance of Islamic learning as a way of equipping Malay women with the skills to fulfill their primary role, as educators of their children.

In the post-war years between 1946 and 1948, women from different ethnic groups mobilised against anti-colonialism and issues related to women's inferior status in occupied Malaya. Although they were members of the female-arm of nationalist and communist parties founded by men, the women became more radicalised in their gender-oriented anti-colonial aims and eventually gained semi-autonomous status from their parent parties. Prominent radical women of the period included the likes of Shamsiah Fakeh and later, Khatijah Sidek.

== Issues in Malaysian feminist struggle ==
=== Sexual and domestic violence against women ===
The first women's NGO in Malaysia, the Women's Aid Organisation (WAO), was founded in the mid 1980s as a shelter for women and children who needed legal consultation and protection from domestic violence. Soon, other NGOs, such as All Women's Action Society (AWAM) emerged to campaign against the rising number of reported incidences of violence against women. Most women's NGOs which were founded since are located in the urban centres of Peninsular Malaysia.

Malaysia outlawed marital rape in 2007.

=== Child brides and forced marriages ===
Cases of child marriages gained nationwide attention in recent years as a human rights and gender issue. In nearly all cases, under-aged girls were married off to men much older than themselves. As most child marriages occur in Malaysia's Malay-Muslim community and thereby sanctioned by Sharia courts, Islamic reasons are often cited as a moral and legal justification for marrying off under-aged girls. Young female rape survivors are sometimes pressured into marrying their abusers as a way of mitigating gross sexual abuses.

== Criticism and backlash ==
In 2012, Malaysia's previous prime minister, Najib Razak, declared that "There is no need for a women’s rights movement in Malaysia because equality has been given from the start." The Malaysian premier's views did not go unchallenged in civil society and online. In April 2014, feminism was accused of being a "facade used by a secret Zionist-Christian alliance to dishonour Muslim women" by Abdullah Zaik Abdul Rahman, the president of the Islamic organisation Malaysian Muslim Solidarity (ISMA).

=== The NGO-isation of feminism in Malaysia ===
Feminism in Malaysia is championed primarily by activists within women's NGOs. There are setbacks to the apparent NGO-isation of feminism in Malaysia, defined as the donor-led and institutionalisation of activism or 'Activism Inc.' The funder-led agenda of women's NGOs in Malaysia resulted in the constraining of feminist activism to fulfill the requirement and targets set by donors. Other problems arise from the NGO-isation of feminism that appear at odds with the spirit of feminism, namely the inter- and intra-organisational income inequalities amongst women workers of NGOs resulting from unequal distribution of funding.

== Prominent Malaysian feminists ==
- Cecilia Ng – Academic and activist
- Irene Fernandez – Feminist and human rights activist who championed migrant worker's rights
- Ivy Josiah – Feminist activist
- Maria Chin Abdullah – Feminist and human rights activist and co-founder of Bersih 2.0
- Marina Mahathir – Human rights activist and writer, daughter of former prime minister Mahathir Mohamad
- Norani Othman – Academic and editor of Muslim Women and the Challenge of Islamic Extremism, co-founder of Sisters in Islam
- Toni Kasim – Feminist activist and political campaigner
- Zainah Anwar – Islamic feminist activist and co-founder of Sisters in Islam
- Rohana Ariffin – Academic and activist, co-founder of Women Crisis Centre and former president of PRM (Parti Rakyat Malaysia).
- Khatijah Sidek – Leader of Kaum Ibu UMNO 1954–1956 and early Malaysian Feminist. Kicked out by UMNO leadership for breaking party discipline, "providing the first challenge to male dominance in the party".

== See also ==
- Aurat (Malay language)
- Human rights in Malaysia
- Islamic feminism
- Musawah
- Sisters in Islam
- Women in Malaysia
- Women's rights
