= Anwar Abdul Malik =

Malaysian politician

Yang Berbahagia Tan Sri Dato' Anwar Abdul Malik PSM DSIJ SMJ AMN
- انوار عبد المليك
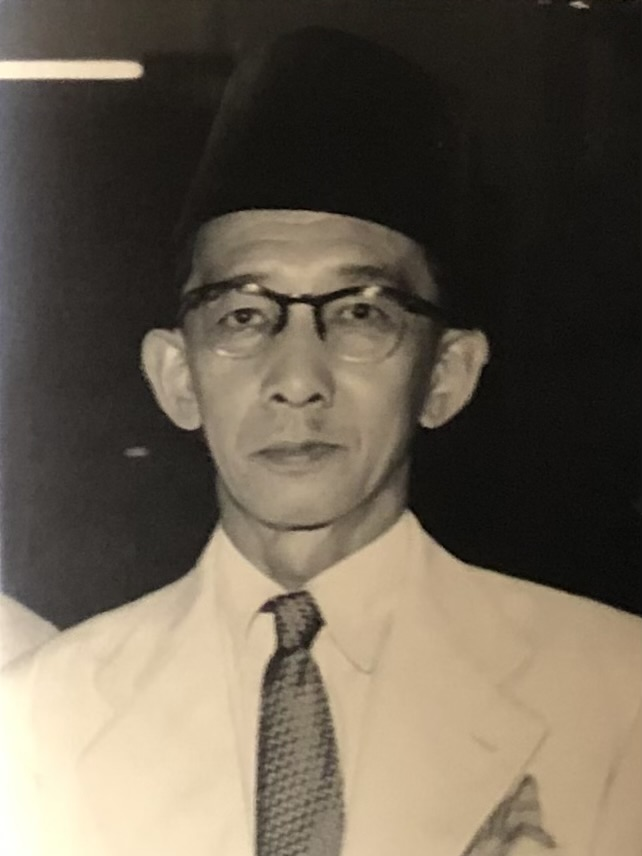

Vice President of Parti Negara
- In office 2 February 1962 – 12 February 1967
- President: Baba Ludek (1962-1964); Garieb Abdul Raouf (1964–1965)
- Secretary-General: Tengku Abdul Halim Ali
- Preceded by: Position established
- Succeeded by: Position abolished

Chairman of Parti Negara Johor Baharu
- In office 3 June 1960 – 12 February 1967 Serving with Garieb Raouf (1962–1964)
- President: Onn Jaafar; Baba Ludek (1962-1964); Garieb Abdul Raouf (1964–1965)
- Secretary-General: Garieb Abdul Raouf (1960–1962); Tengku Abdul Halim Ali; (1962–1967)
- Preceded by: Syed Abdul Kadir Mohamad
- Succeeded by: Position abolished

Private Secretary to the Menteri Besar of Johor
- In office 1 June 1947 – 4 February 1954
- Monarchs: Ibrahim of Johor; Ismail of Johor
- Menteri Besar: Onn Jaafar (1947–1950); Syed Abdul Kadir Mohamad; (1952–1955)
- Succeeded by: Inche Mohamed Yunos Noordin

Member of the Johor Baharu Town Council for Kampung Nong Chik
- In office 7 December 1958 – 26 May 1961
- Preceded by: Che Kalsom Ali
- Succeeded by: Sanudin Abdul Manas

Personal details
- Born: Anwar bin Abdul Malik; February 1898 Muar, Johor, British Malaya
- Died: January 31, 1998 Johor Bahru, Johor, Malaysia
- Party: United Malays National Organisation (1946–1954); Parti Negara (1954–1967)
- Spouse: Saodah Abdullah (1951–1998)
- Children: Six incl. Zainah Anwar; Ahmad Zakii Anwar

Anwar bin Abdul Malik (Jawi: انوار عبد المليك; February 1898 – 31 January 1998) was a Malaysian politician. He was one of the founding members of the United Malays National Organisation (UMNO), alongside Dato' Onn Jaafar, Tan Sri Mohamed Noah Omar, Haji Syed Alwi bin Syed Sheikh al-Hadi, and Syed Abdul Kadir Mohamad. The party was established to oppose the Malayan Union, which was seen as undermining the powers of the Malay rulers and threatening the rights of the Bumiputera.

In the early 1950s, Anwar opposed Onn Jaafar’s proposal to open UMNO’s membership to all Malayans regardless of ethnicity, arguing that the party’s immediate role was to consolidate Malay political strength and lead the country toward independence. When Onn resigned from UMNO in 1951 and later established the Independence of Malaya Party (IMP), Anwar remained within UMNO. After the IMP failed to gain traction, Onn founded Parti Negara in 1954, at which point Anwar, having retired from government service, was persuaded to join and was appointed secretary of the Johor Bahru branch.

== Early years ==
Anwar was born in Muar, Johor, in 1898. His father, Haji Abdul Malik, was a Syariah lawyer who had six wives in total. Anwar was the first-born son of his father’s first wife and had five siblings. He received his early education at Muar High School, where he studied from 1911 to 1917.

Anwar's involvement in politics began at the age of 20, when he joined the Muslim Debate Association in Muar in 1918.

== Public service and political career ==
=== Malayan Public Works Department ===
Anwar joined the Malayan Public Works Department in Muar in the early 1920s. In 1928, he was appointed chief clerk in the department and transferred to Johor Bahru where he became an active member of the Johor Malay Association under the leadership of Abdul Rahman Yasin. As a committee member, he played a central role in efforts to unite the various state Malay associations in opposition to the British proposal for the Malayan Union

In an article published by The Star on 30 May 1990, Anwar recalled:

"When I reported for work, I was surprised to find that I was working for ten Englishmen. I had worked with them before, but not for so many. I immediately asked for a transfer. They were shocked at my request. I stayed on, but I made it very clear to the Englishmen that I did not consider them my superior."

=== Formation of UMNO ===
When the Malayan Union was established on 1 April 1946 by the British, Anwar, together with Haji Syed Alwi bin Syed Sheikh al-Hadi and Syed Abdul Kadir Mohamad, met the district officer, Dato' Onn Jaafar, in Batu Pahat. At the meeting, they conceived the idea of forming a single party strong enough to oppose the Malayan Union, which was seen as undermining the powers of the Malay rulers and threatening the rights of the Malays. They were later joined by Mohamed Noah Omar, who was then serving as a magistrate in Batu Pahat.

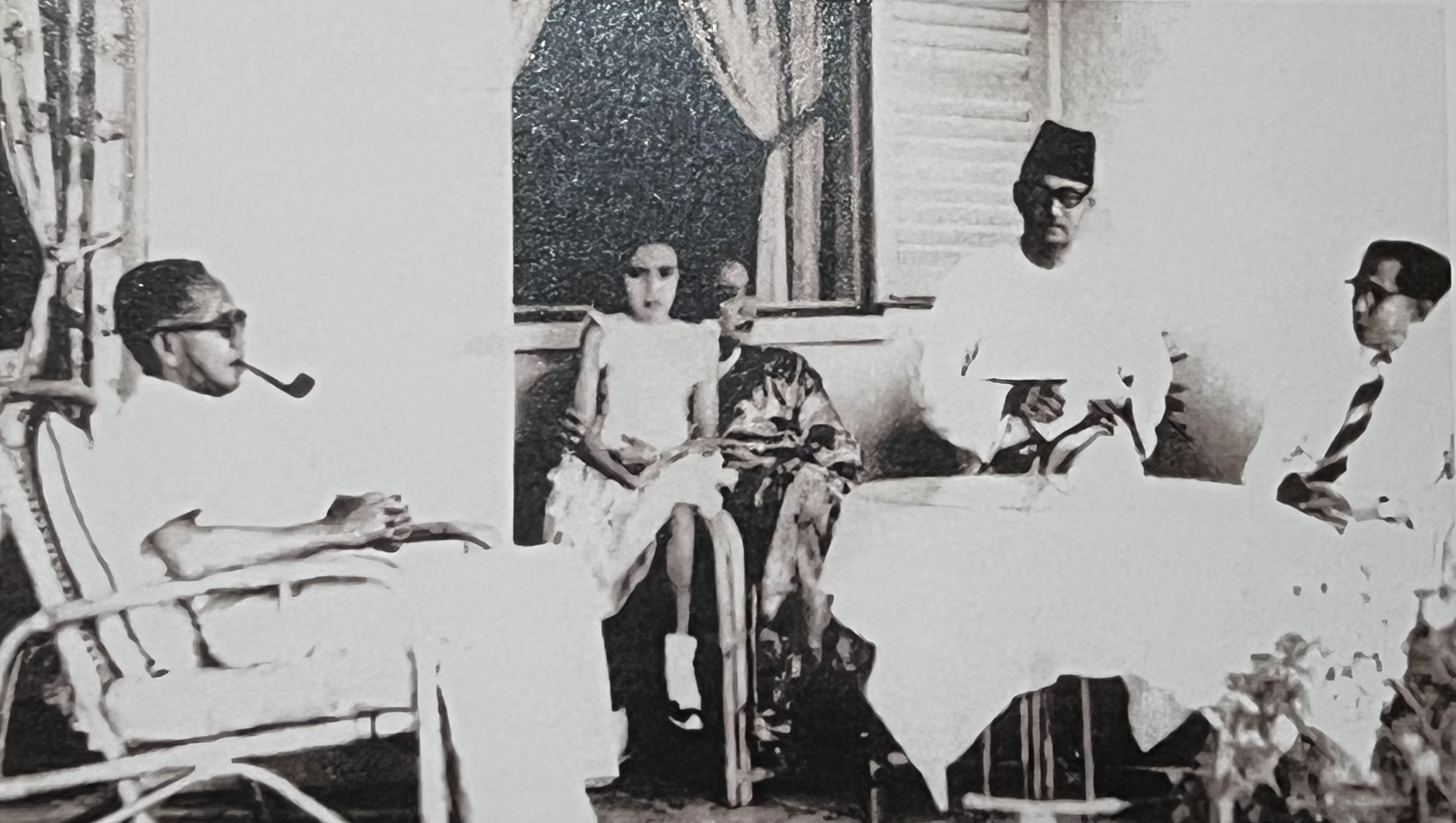
Anwar, Onn and Noah in discussion in 1946. From left: Mohamed Noah Omar, Noraziah Onn (Onn's daughter), Halimah Hussein (Onn's wife), Onn and Anwar

At the meeting, Anwar gave the United Malays Organisation (UMO) its name, inspired by the establishment of the United Nations in 1945. (Za'aba later added the word "National" on 12 May 1946). Anwar proposed that Onn should lead the organisation, stressing that a strong and fearless leader was needed to unite the Malays across all eleven states and oppose the British proposals. The others present — Haji Syed Alwi bin Syed Sheikh al-Hadi, Syed Abdul Rahman Abu Bakar, Haji Mohamed Noah Omar, and Syed Ahmad Alwi — agreed to his suggestion.

Onn subsequently wrote a letter to Utusan Melayu, announcing the formation of UMO and calling on all Malay organisations to unite. A series of Malay congresses were then held, culminating in the establishment of the nationalist party, the United Malays National Organisation (UMNO), on 11 May 1946 at the Third Malay Congress in Johor Bahru, with Dato' Onn Jaafar as its leader.

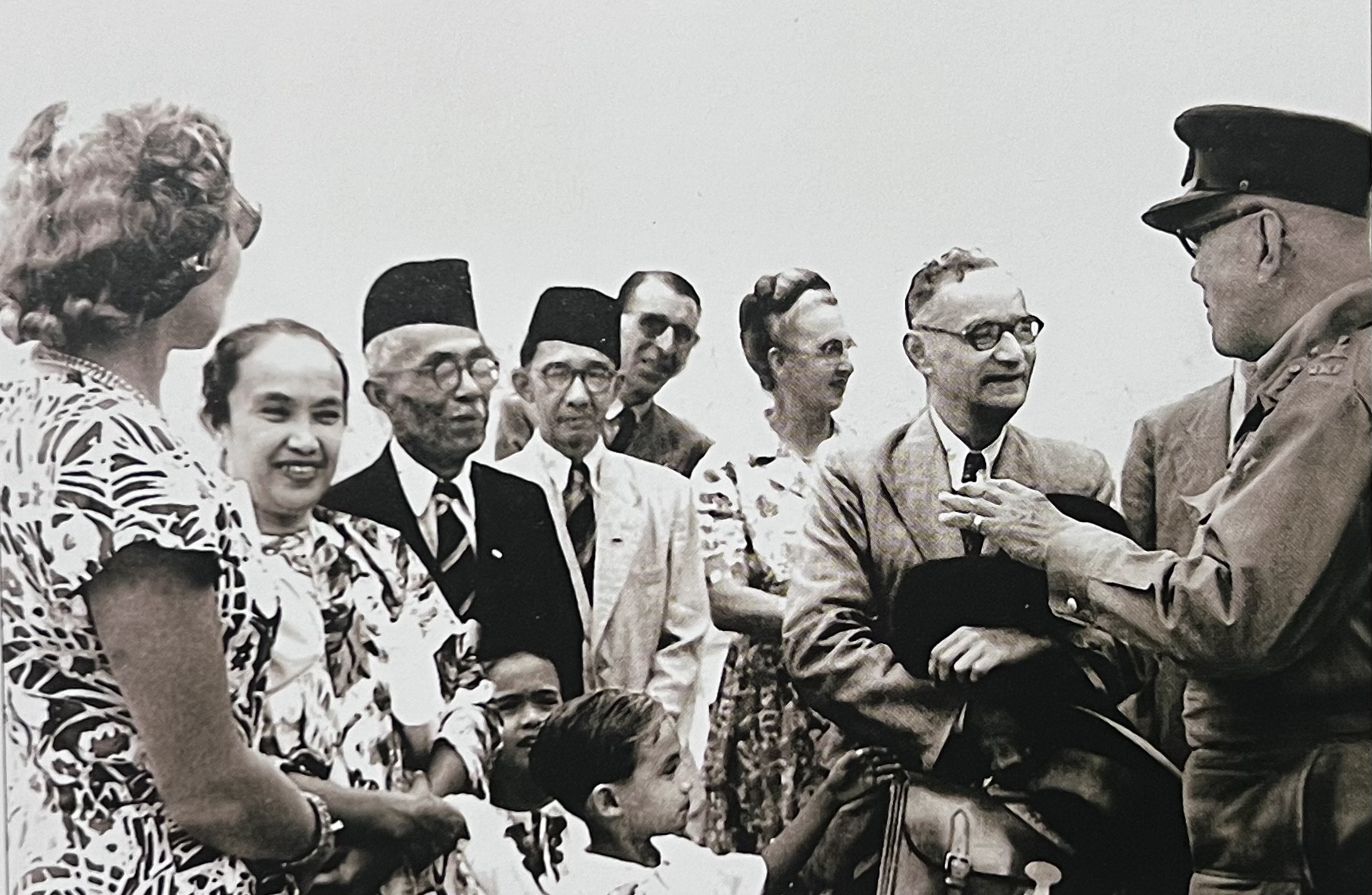
In October 1948, Anwar (in light suit) accompanied Dato' Onn Jaafar to London for talks on Commonwealth Aid to Southeast Asia. On their return at Kallang Airport, Dato' Onn was greeted by Ibrahim of Johor and Lady Marcella.

When Dato' Onn Jaafar became Menteri Besar of Johor on 1 June 1947, Anwar became his private secretary. As Onn could not maintain two roles as Menteri Besar of Johor and President of UMNO, he resigned as Menteri Besar on 18 May 1950. He was succeeded by Syed Abdul Kadir Mohamad, with Anwar continuing as his private secretary.

=== Onn Jaafar resigns from UMNO ===
By 1950, the Communities Liaison Committee (CLC) had issued the "Agreed View," which recommended measures to improve the socioeconomic position of the Malays, including restrictions on immigration and the acceptance of conditional jus soli (birthright citizenship) for persons of Asian or Eurasian parentage born in the Malay states. In return for these new citizenship rights, non-Malays, particularly the Chinese, were expected to assist in improving the economic position of the Malays.

Onn supported this compromise and came to believe that Malaya’s independence would require cooperation among all communities. He therefore proposed that UMNO open its membership to all Malayans regardless of ethnicity. The proposal was met with strong opposition from within the party, many of whose members feared that Malay political power would be diluted.

Despite opposition, Onn stood firm, maintaining that independence could only be achieved through multi-ethnic cooperation. Facing mounting hostility, he resigned as president of UMNO on 26 August 1951. Anwar disagreed with Onn’s decision to resign, as he believed UMNO had been created not only to oppose the Malayan Union but also to consolidate the position of the Malays and lead the country towards independence. He felt it was not the right time to broaden the party to other communities, particularly given the political and economic divisions that still existed.

Onn subsequently formed the Independence of Malaya Party (IMP) on 16 September 1951, but Anwar remained in UMNO during this period. When the IMP failed to gain support, Onn established Parti Negara on 28 February 1954.

By then, Anwar had retired after forty years of service to the Johore Government and was succeeded by Mohamed Yunos Nordin as private secretary to Syed Abdul Kadir Mohamad, the Menteri Besar of Johor. But Anwar was persuaded by Onn to join Parti Negara and was appointed secretary of the Johor Baharu branch.

=== Parti Negara ===
In the 1954 Malayan state elections, Anwar contested the Johore Bahru Coastal constituency but was defeated by UMNO’s Haji Mohamed Amin Amran. The following year, in the 1955 Malayan general election, he stood in the Johore Tengah constituency, where he lost to the MCA candidate, Teo Chze Chong.

In the 1959 Malayan state elections, he contested the Gelang Patah but lost to UMNO's Syed Mohamed bin Edros.

In the 1958 Malayan local elections, Anwar won his first electoral contest in the Kampung Nong Chik ward of Johor Baharu, securing a seat on the four-member council after defeating his opponent, Abdullah bin Dato' Rahman.

=== Onn Jaafar passes away ===
Dato' Onn Jaafar died in February 1962. On 23 August 1962, at the Parti Negara National Conference in Kuala Terengganu, Anwar was elected Vice President of the party alongside Garieb Abdul Raouf, with Baba bin Ludek chosen as President and Ali Haji Abdullah as Treasurer. Following Baba Ludek’s resignation in 1964, Garieb succeeded him as president.

In 1965 Garieb announced his resignation, declaring that he no longer believed in “communal politics.” Parti Negara continued to decline thereafter and was formally dissolved in 1967, effectively bringing Anwar’s political career to an end.

== Later years and death ==
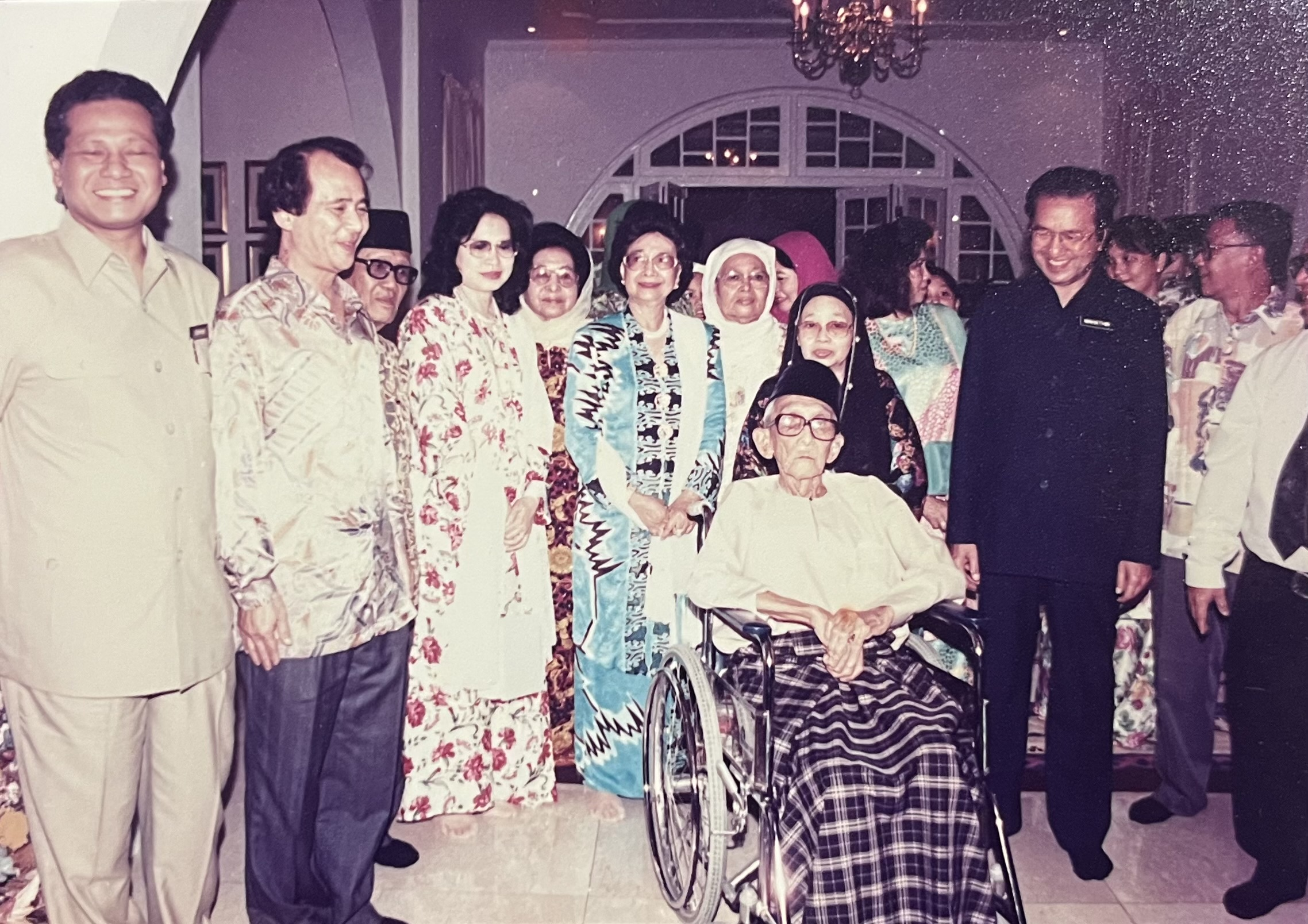
On 4 July 1996, Anwar met with Prime Minister Dr. Mahathir Mohamad, accompanied by his wife Saodah Abdullah, at the residence of Abdul Ghani Othman, the Menteri Besar of Johor.

Even during his years in politics, Anwar was active in charitable and community organisations, a commitment he continued after his retirement. He served on the boards of governors of several schools and was a committee member of both the Malaysian Historical Society and Perkim. He also served on the Johor Prison Pardons Board, and initiated the founding of the Johor Spastics Children's Association.

Anwar, a chain-smoker throughout his life, died of bronchopneumonia at Sultanah Aminah Hospital, Johor Bahru on 31 January 1998 at age 99 and was buried at Mahmoodiah Muslim Cemetery. His wife, Saodah Abdullah, died the following year at the age of 78.

A few years before Anwar's death, at a meeting arranged by Datuk Abdul Ghani Othman, the Menteri Besar of Johor, in conjunction with Prime Minister Dr. Mahathir Mohamad’s two-day official visit to the state, Abdul Ghani described Anwar as "a man whose intelligence and dedication to Umno and the Malay community have benefited the party and the Malays. The younger generation could learn a lot from Anwar's struggle and undivided loyalty to the party," he said.

== Personal life and family ==
Anwar was a sportsman. He was a shooting, tennis and billiard champion at the Johore Civil Service club.

He married his first wife, Mariam Haji Abdul Rahim and together conceived three children, Shukriah Anwar, Mohamad Hyffny Anwar and Marina Anwar.

When Anwar's wife died in 1945, he married Saodah Abdullah in 1951. They had three children, Tan Sri Datuk Zarinah Anwar (1953), the ex-chairman of the Malaysian Securities Commission, Zainah Anwar (1954), a prominent Malaysian non-governmental organisation leader and activist of Sisters in Islam and Ahmad Zakii Anwar (1955), a well-known Malaysian artist.

== Character ==
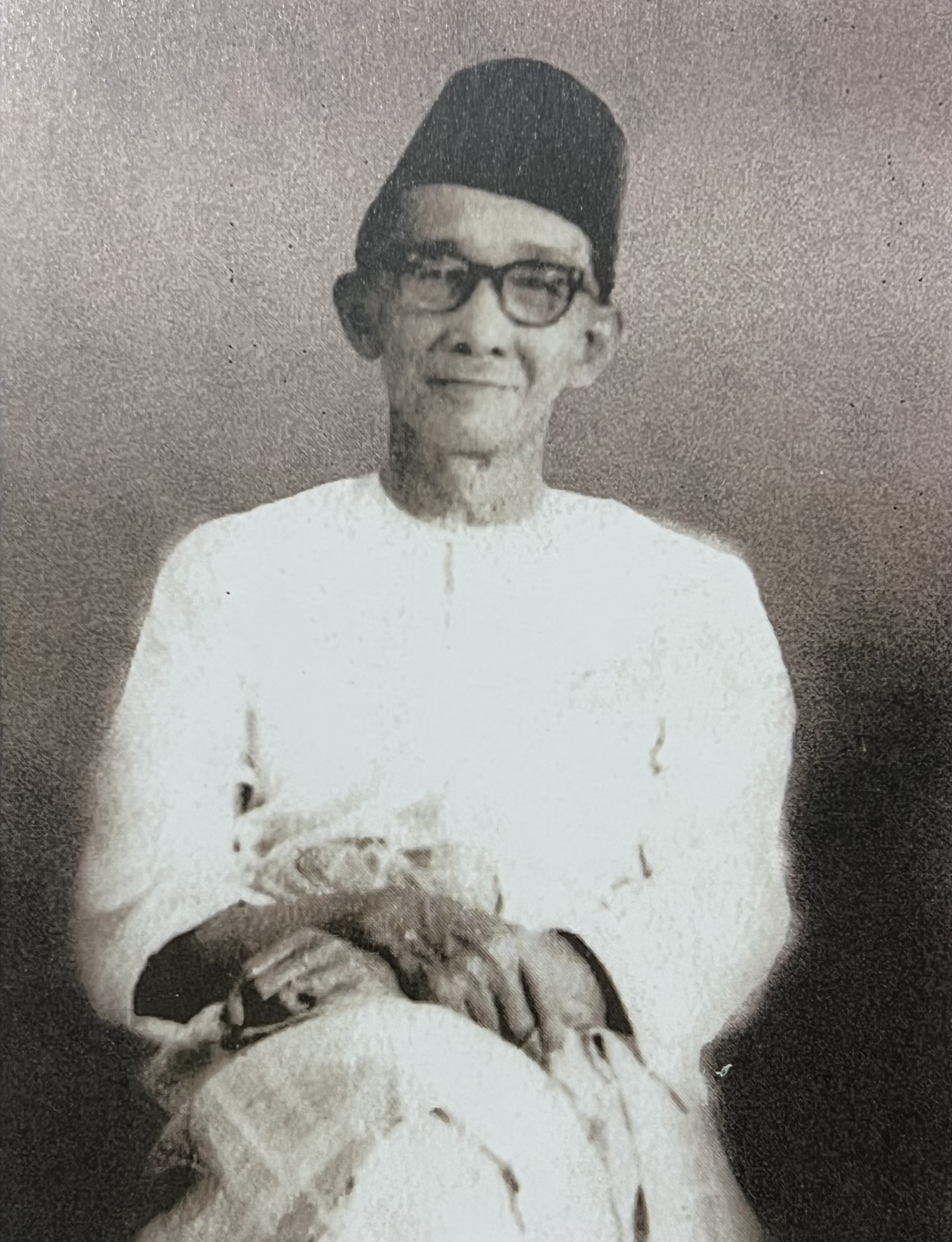
A portrait of Anwar. Circa 1940s

Anwar did not come from wealth or privilege, and he never held senior office in UMNO despite being regarded as one of its early founders. He was described as part of a generation of nationalists motivated less by personal ambition than by a desire to contribute to the cause of independence. Within UMNO circles in Johor he was held in respect, although his direct manner of speech sometimes led critics to view him as overly blunt.

He was remembered by contemporaries for his integrity and discipline. His daughter, journalist and activist Zainah Anwar, later described him as embodying “honesty, integrity, and courage.”

During the agitation against the Malayan Union, he was noted for a retort to a British officer who had asked why Malays opposed the Union. Pointing to the Johor state flag, Anwar reportedly said:

“Look, that is the Flag of the State of Johor. We have a flag and a constitution of our own. You cannot expect to just chuck your flag here as if this was Antarctica, where there is nothing but penguins!”

In his personal life, Anwar was described as formal and punctual, with habits sometimes characterised as “more English than Malay.” He was particular about propriety in dress, believing that men attending Friday prayers should wear the full Baju Melayu with kain samping. He was also known for avoiding personal gain through political connections; during the premiership of Hussein Onn, the son of his former colleague, he declined business opportunities offered to him. He was regarded as scrupulously honest, once insisting on paying full customs duties despite officers suggesting ways to avoid them.

== Honours ==
=== Malaysian honours ===
- Malaysia
  - Commander of the Order of Loyalty to the Crown of Malaysia (PSM) – Tan Sri (1996)
  - Member of the Order of the Defender of the Realm (AMN) (1973)
- Johor
  - Knight Companion of the Order of the Loyalty of Sultan Ismail (DSIJ) – Dato' (1977)
  - Companion of the Order of the Crown of Johor (SMJ) (1974)
  - Sultan Ibrahim Diamond Jubilee Medal
  - Sultan Ismail Coronation Medal
  - Long Service Medal

=== Foreign honours ===
- United Kingdom
  - 1939-1945 Star
  - Pacific Star
  - Defence Medal
  - War Medal 1939–1945
  - Queen Elizabeth II Coronation Medal

== Election results ==
Malayan State and Settlement Council Representatives
Year	Constituency	Candidate	Votes	%	Opponent(s)	Votes	%	Ballots cast	Majority	Turnout
1954 Malayan state elections	Johore Bahru Coastal	Haji Anwar Haji Abdul Malik (Parti Negara)	710	15.1%	Haji Mohamed Amin Amran (UMNO)	3,995	84.96%	4,705	3,285	81.85%
1959 Malayan state elections	Gelang Patah	Haji Anwar Haji Abdul Malik (Parti Negara)	702	13.67%	Syed Mohamed bin Edros (UMNO)	2,776	54.09%	5,134	1,120	79.0%
1959 Malayan state elections	Gelang Patah	Haji Anwar Haji Abdul Malik (Parti Negara)	702	13.67%	Sidi Jas (PRM)	1,656	32.26%	5,134	1,120	79.0%

Federal Legislative Council (Malaya)
Year	Constituency	Name	Votes	Pct	Opponent(s)	Votes	Pct	Ballots cast	Majority	Turnout
1955 Malayan general election	Johore Tengah	Haji Anwar Haji Abdul Malik (Parti Negara)	1,068	13.08%	Teoh Chze Chong (MCA)	7,100	86.92%	8,168	6,032	71.73%

Johor Bahru City Council
Year	Constituency	Name	Votes	Pct	Opponent(s)	Votes	Pct	Ballots cast	Majority	Turnout
1958 Malayan local elections	Kampung Nong Chik	Haji Anwar Haji Abdul Malik (Parti Negara)	881	51.93%	Abdullah Abdul Rahman (UMNO)	815	48%	1,696	66	62%
1961 Malayan local elections	Kampung Bahru	Haji Anwar Haji Abdul Malik (Parti Negara)	328	31.9%	Sanudin Abdul Manas (UMNO)	701	68.1%	1,029	373	60%

== Media ==
In the 2007 film, 1957: Hati Malaya, directed by Shuhaimi Baba, Anwar was portrayed by local Malaysian actor, Azhar Sulaiman.
