= Ahmad Zakii Anwar =

Malaysian artist (born 1955)

- Born: March 31, 1955 (age 71); Johor Bahru, Federation of Malaya
- Education: MARA University of Technology
- Known for: Painting, charcoal.

Ahmad Zakii Anwar (born 1955 in Johor Bahru, Johor, Federation of Malaya) is a Malaysian artist known for his photo-realist still-life paintings.

== Early life and education ==
Zakii was born in Johor Bahru, Johor, Malaysia. He is the youngest of six children. Zakii developed his love for art at the age of six. He attended Ngee Heng Primary School from 1962 to 1967 and later went to secondary school at English College Johore Bahru. After graduation, Zakii was accepted into the School of Art and Design at the MARA Institute of Technology.

== Family ==
Zakii's father, Tan Sri Haji Anwar bin Abdul Malik, was a politician. He was credited as the person who gave the United Malays National Organisation (UMNO) its name – initially United Malays Organization. This was at a meeting in Batu Pahat when seven UMNO founders from Johor Bahru met Datuk Onn Jaafar to call for a unification of the disparate Malay nationalist groups at the time. He later became Onn’s private secretary when Onn became Johor’s chief minister. Anwar's mother was Hajjah Saodah binti Abdullah, a housewife. Zakii has two elder sisters, Tan Sri Zarinah Anwar, who was the chairman of Securities Commission Malaysia and Zainah Anwar, prominent Malaysian non-governmental organisation leader and activist. She was the head of Sisters in Islam for more than twenty years before deciding to step down to give way to young blood to continue the fight for Muslim women's rights. Their father died in 1998, and their mother, Hajjah Saodah bte Abdullah, died the following year. Zakii is married with 4 children.

== Career ==
The artist began his career as a graphic artist, producing some of the leading advertising graphics of his time. From there, he continued to establish his name by converting to fine art where his techniques have been exemplary and world class. Zakii came to attention for his virtuosity and command of a spectrum of media from charcoals to oils, building a reputation for stunning photo-realist still-life paintings and expressive portraits. Later, a more contemporary edge surfaced in his works as Zakii introduced urban subjects and settings into his canvases. He is lauded for capturing not just city motifs and urban features but also a distinctive psychological dimension and cinematic quality in these scenarios. Zakii's preoccupation with the spiritual or metaphysical aspects of urban life, as seen through his use of icons, symbols and allegories (including metaphors of theatre, performance and masks) have also marked his practice.

Some of Zakii's exhibitions include:

=== Solo exhibitions ===
- 1997| One Man Show, Valentine Willie Fine Art, Kuala Lumpur, Malaysia
- 1998| Distant Gamelan, Art Focus, Singapore
- 1999| Presence, Barbara Greene Fine Art, New York, United States
- 2000| Stills, Taksu, Kuala Lumpur, Malaysia
- 2001| Shadowland, Plum Blossoms, Hong Kong
- 2003| Interpreter of Desires, Taksu Kuala Lumpur, Malaysia
- 2004| Borobudor, Amanjiwo, Jogjakarta, Indonesia | Arangbali, Taksu Jakarta, Indonesia
- 2005| Primordial Dream, Singapore Tyler Print Institute, Singapore Icons | Icons, Richard Koh Fine Art, Kuala Lumpur, Malaysia
- 2006| Subliminal, The Drawing Room, Manila, Philippines | Numthong Gallery, Bangkok, Thailand
- 2007| Ahmad Zakii Anwar: Paintings, Drawings & Prints 1991 – 2007, Singapore Tyler Print Institute, Singapore | Kota Sunyi: Solo Exhibition by Ahmad Zakii Anwar | CP Foundation, CP ArtSpace, Jakarta, Indonesia
- 2008| Disclosure: A Mid-Career Survey, GALERI PETRONAS, Kuala Lumpur | Drawings, Sketches & Studies, Richard Koh Fine Art, Kuala Lumpur | Gimme Shelter, 19 Jalan Berangan, Kuala Lumpur
- 2009| Being, NUS Museum, National University of Singapore, Singapore
- 2010| Nafsu, Nadi Gallery, Jakarta, Indonesia
- 2011| Bones and Sinews, AndrewShire Gallery, Los Angeles, United States
- 2012| Kota Sepi, Valentine Willie Fine Art, Kuala Lumpur, Malaysia
