= Musawah =

Progressive Islamic movement

Musawah ('equality'; in Arabic: مساواة) is a global movement for equality and justice in the Muslim family and family laws, led by Islamic feminists "seeking to reclaim Islam and the Qur'an for themselves", applying progressive interpretations of sacred texts. Their interpretations are often referred to as feminist tafsir. The name "Musawah" comes from an Arabic word that translates as "equality". Musawah was founded in 2009.

== Context and history ==
Women scholars started applying Islamic feminist interpretations since late 19th century. 1990s, triggered by an increase in the movement of women in the fight for women's human rights internationally, such as the World Women's Conference in Beijing in 1995 which gave birth to a commitment to build people through gender equality and the CEDAW (Convention on the elimination of all forms of discrimination against women) which gave birth to a commitment to eliminate discrimination. By late 20th century research in theoretical Islamic feminism developed in to full fledged methodical science of interpretation called feminist tafsir or Hermeneutics of feminism in Islam; to promote the ideas of gender-justice and gender equality by reinterpreting to enable true sense of Islamic egalitarian values and subsequently developed in to Muslim women's active movements .

Twelve women met in Istanbul as the planning committee in March 2007, from countries around the world: Egypt, the Gambia, Indonesia, Iran, Malaysia, Morocco, Nigeria, Pakistan, Qatar, Turkey and the United Kingdom.

Musawah was officially launched in Kuala Lumpur in February 2009, at a meeting of 250 Muslim activists, scholars, legal practitioners and policy-makers from 47 countries. Mona Eltahawy, the Egyptian-American journalist and Musawah member, commented on this founding moment: "Panel discussions and dinner talk [...] were heated, but not about headscarves or education. We had much heavier issues on our minds — like a woman's right to initiate divorce, how to protect women against clerics who say Islam gives a husband the right to beat his wife, fighting forced marriage. In other words, wrestling Islam back from the men who use it against us." The discussions were supported in part by research on the impact on the lives of women of islamic family law, disseminated over the preceding decade by Women Living Under Muslim Laws.

== Focus ==
Musawah's advocacy draws from four primary sources:

- Islamic teachings;
- Universal human rights;
- National constitutional guarantees of equality; and
- "The lived realities of women and men".

The Musawah movement has identified 45 countries that have discriminatory personal laws that work against Muslim women's interest, justice and equality.

In practice, this has translated into advocacy around issues such as reforming divorce laws in Muslim countries. Tools used by Musawah to advance this goal have included research into the differences between traditional Muslim family laws and the Convention on the Elimination of All Forms of Discrimination Against Women, publication of books on Islamic jurisprudence, and toolkits for advocates.

== Role and challenges ==
One of Musawah's co-founders, Malaysian activist Zainah Anwar, offered this perspective on Musawah's role in the broader women's and human rights movements: "What Musawah brings to the table is a rich and diverse collection of interpretations, juristic opinions and principles that makes it possible to read equality and justice in Islam, and construe these twin values at national and international levels. It is a vital contribution at a time when democracy, human rights and women's rights constitute the modern ethical paradigm of today's world."

Challenges in Musawah's work include ongoing debates around the multiple interpretations of the Koran, and the defence of a human rights interpretation from within Islam, rather than a secular human rights framework.

== See also ==
- Aurat March
- Gerwani
- Hermeneutics of feminism in Islam
- Sisters in Islam
