= Honeycomb housing =

Honeycomb housing is an urban planning model pertaining to residential subdivision design.

The defining hexagonal tessellation, or "honeycomb" pattern, consists of multiple housing clusters containing 5–16 houses and centered around a courtyard in a cul-de-sac arrangement at its smallest unit of organization. Multiple clusters are connected to each other to form larger cul-de-sac communities with up to 42 houses in total. These courtyard communities are in turn also connected to one another, making up a distinct neighborhood of up to 300 houses.

The honeycomb concept was first introduced in Malaysia as an alternative to terrace houses and the predominantly rectilinear form of residential layouts.

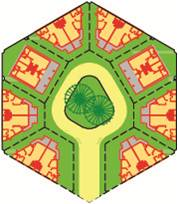
A small courtyard neighbourhood.

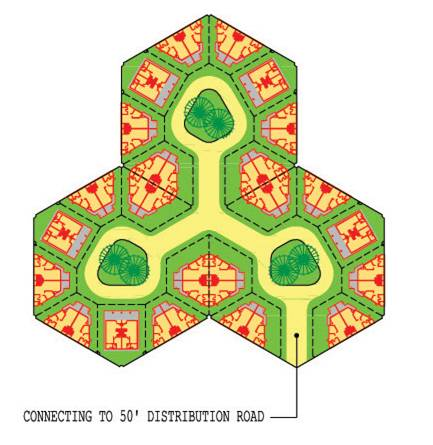
A cul-de-sac community composed from three connected courtyards.

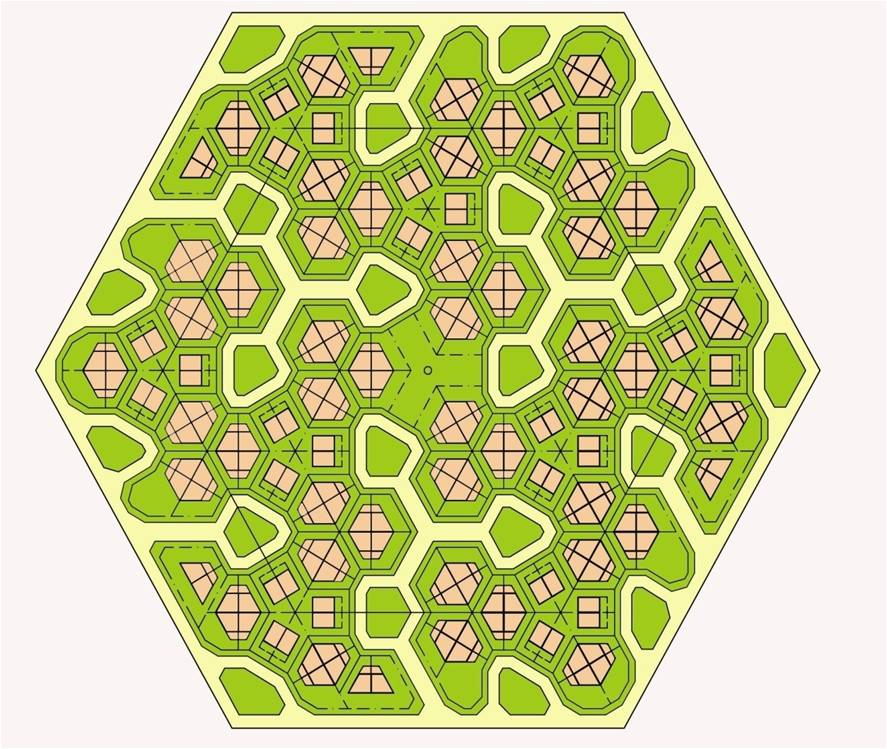
A honeycomb neighbourhood.

It can also be described as a new form of cul-de-sac layout.

== From Cul-de-sac to Honeycomb ==
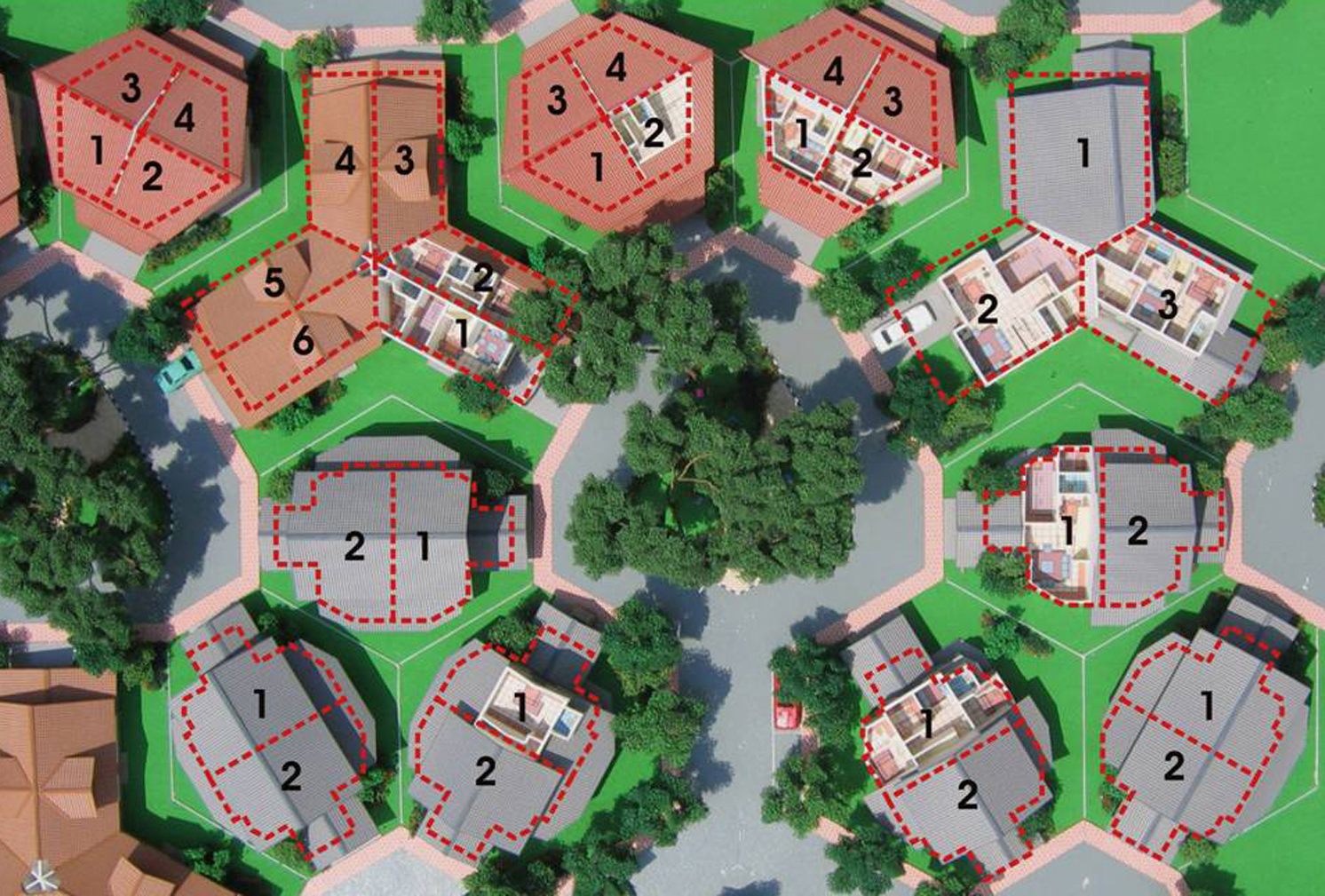
The residential blocks are divided into 2, 3, 4 or 6, creating duplex, triplex, quadruplex or sextuplex units.

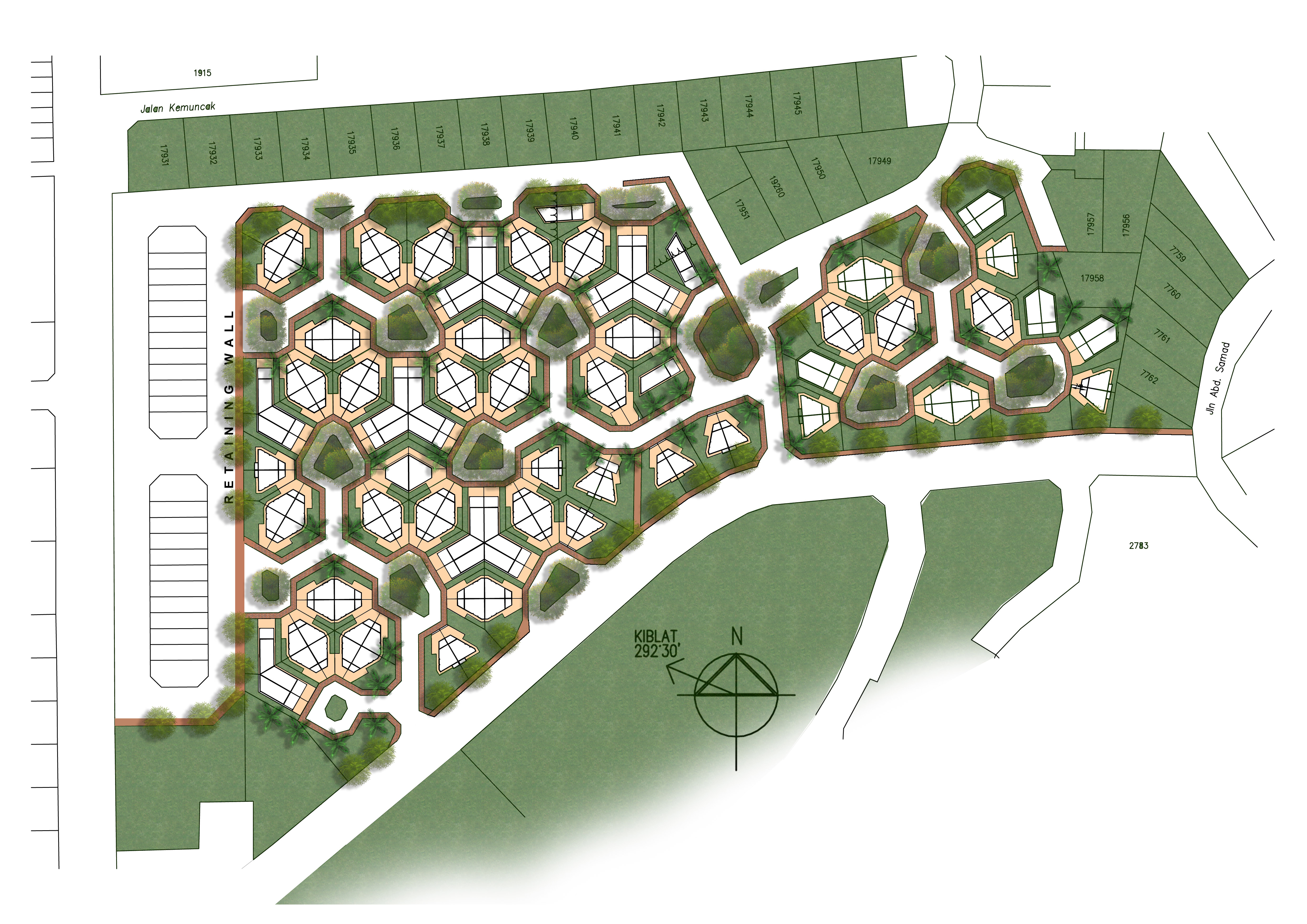
Honeycomb Layout Plan.

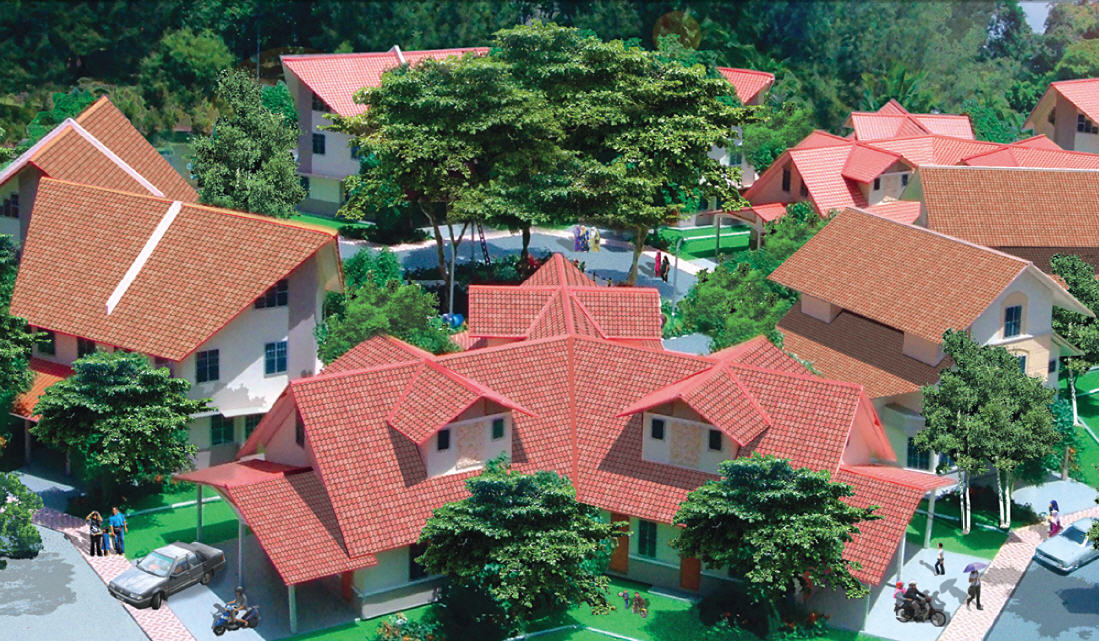
Bird's eye view of a Honeycomb cul-de-sac.

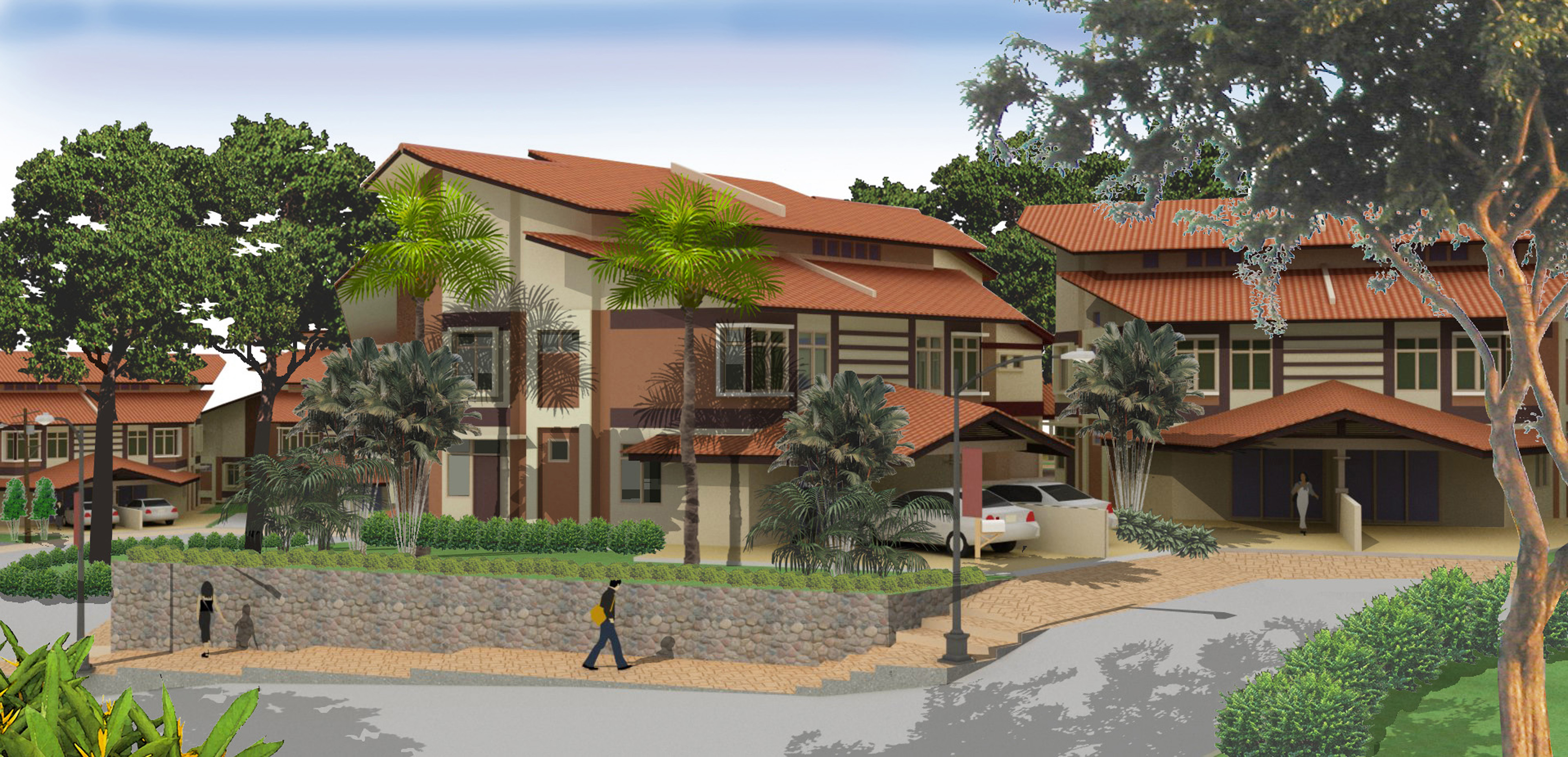
Perspective of quadruplex honeycomb house.

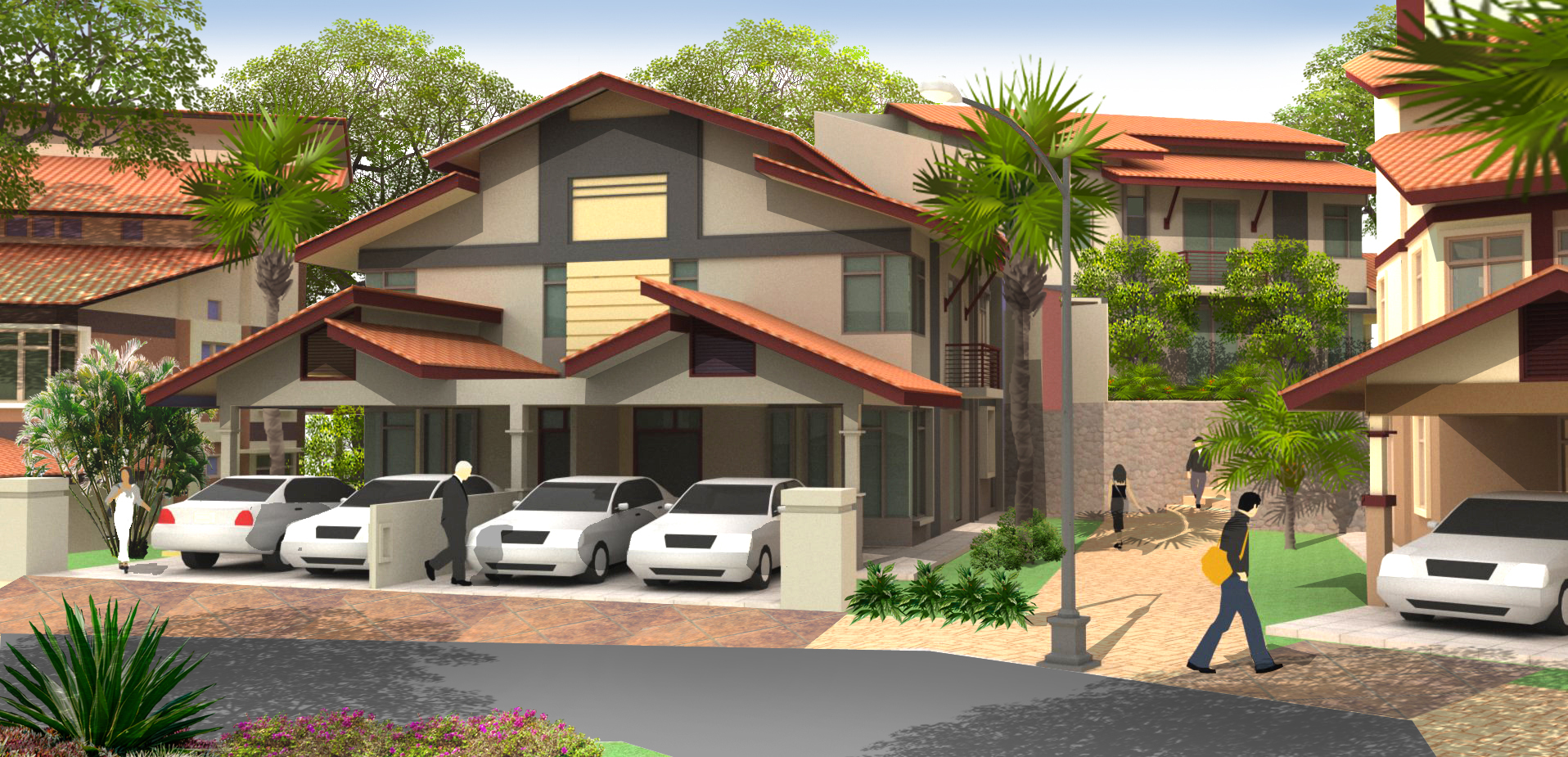
Perspective of sextuplex honeycomb house.

Cul-de-sacs are popular: they are perceived as being safer, more exclusive and neighbourly. According to one study, between the 'grid', 'loops' and cul-de-sacs, the latter were the most popular. These houses are used in Malaysia.

Since houses are built around a small park with plentiful shady trees, this communal garden is easily accessible to all in the cul-de-sac, allowing it to act as a social focus that can encourage social interaction and neighborly spirit.

The courtyard area is a "defensible space" as well, as it acts naturally to reduce crime in the sense that strangers are quickly spotted. The short winding roads put a stop to speeding traffic, and certain to dissuade snatch thieves on motorcycles – therefore becoming safe for children, pedestrians and cyclists.

Apart from the social advantages, it is also claimed that compared to the terrace house layout, the honeycomb layout uses land efficiently and offers savings in the cost of infrastructure.

The honeycomb Layout may be said to be inspired from the geometrical design of Islamic tiles and the structure of beehives. Introduced by Kuala Lumpur-based architect Mazlin Ghazali, it has received a patent, that is expired as of 2024.

== Honeycomb Housing projects under construction ==
The honeycomb concept has been applied to a hillside development on 14 acres of land at Kampung Nong Chik the edge of Johor Bahru business district in a development which advertises a modern version of the traditional village or "kampong" lifestyle.

== Criticism ==
Being so new, many developers would worry about the difficulty of obtaining approvals from the local authorities and so hesitate to be the first to adopt the honeycomb concept. Another problem is that the houses are not rectangular and the house design ends up with odd corners in the house. Another criticism comes from followers ‘fengshui’, the ancient Chinese art of geomancy, who believe that in a cul-de-sac 'the chi energy coming to a house placed at the end of a road is usually fast, so the energy is pernicious and non-beneficial. Instead of bringing good fortune, it brings misfortune'.

Nowadays cul-de-sacs are often frowned upon in planning circles, especially by supporters of the New Urbanism: However the Honeycomb housing concept – which allows relatively high density – does appear to overcome some of the concerns here.
