= 1958 Malayan local elections =

Local elections were held in the Federation of Malaya in 1958.

== City council election ==
=== George Town ===
Date: Electorate: Turnout:
Wards	Elected councillor	Elected party	Votes	Majority	Opponent(s)	Party	Votes
?
Jelutong	1.						
Kelawei	1.						
Sungei Pinang	1.						
Tanjong East	1.						
Tanjong West	1.						

== Municipal election ==
=== Kuala Lumpur ===
Date: 21 December 1958; Electorate: 23,236; Turnout: 51.6%
Wards	Elected councillor	Elected party	Votes	Majority	Opponent(s)	Party	Votes	Turnout
Alliance 3 | Socialist Front 1 | PPP 0
Bangsar	1. S. S. Nayagam	Socialist Front (Labour Party)	1,498	149	2. K. Gurupatham	Alliance (MIC)	1,349	53.85%
Imbi	1. Law Joo Kooi	Alliance (MCA)	1,244	502	2. Lum Kin Tuck; 3. Americk Singh	PPR; Socialist Front	742; 482	48.56%
Petaling	1. Chan Keong Hon	Alliance (MCA)	1,597	502	2. Chew Choo Soot; 3. Gun Yong Ming	PPR; Socialist Front	1,095; 1,055	58.59%
Sentul	1. Che Enchom binti Zainuddin	Alliance (UMNO)	1,652	583	2. Ahmad Daud	Socialist Front	1,069	43.47%

=== Malacca ===
Date: 6 December 1958; Electorate: Turnout:
Wards	Elected councillor	Elected party	Votes	Majority	Opponent(s)	Party	Votes	Turnout
Alliance 3 (6) | Malayan Party 1 (5) | Socialist Front 0 (1)
Bukit China	1. M. N. Dutt	Malayan Party	1,378	223	2. G. Mariappan	Alliance (MIC)	1,155	68%
Fort	1. Ng Chong Chee	Alliance (MCA)	1,387	58	2. Chan Choo Tiong	Malayan Party	1,329	58%
Mata Kuching	1. Mohamed Abdul Rahman	Alliance (UMNO)	1,059	486	2. Hasnul Abdul Hadi; 3. Said Bachee	Socialist Front; Malayan Party	573; 413	69.63%
Tranquerah	1. Lim Cheng Hoon	Alliance (MCA)	1,182	147	2. Norma Grace Koch	Malayan Party	1,035	71.75%

== Town councils election ==
=== Alor Star ===
Date: Electorate: Turnout:
Wards	Elected councillor	Elected party	Votes	Majority	Opponent(s)	Party	Votes
?
Kampong	1.						
Pekan	1.						
Seberang	1.						

=== Bachok ===
Date: 10 May 1958; Electorate: Turnout:
Wards	Elected councillor	Elected party	Votes	Majority	Opponent(s)	Party	Votes
?
Kuala Bachok	1.				Mohamed Amin Yaacob; Abdul Rahman Mamat; Hassan Osman	Ind. Ind. Ind.	
Nipah	1. Ismail Yusoff		Unopposed				
Pulau Belongan	1. Ismail Ahmad		Unopposed				

=== Bandar Maharani, Muar ===
Date: 12 May 1958; Electorate: Turnout:
Wards	Elected councillor	Elected party	Votes	Majority	Opponent(s)	Party	Votes
?
Parit Stongkat	1.						

Date: 6 December 1958; Electorate: Turnout:
Wards	Elected councillor	Elected party	Votes	Majority	Opponent(s)	Party	Votes
Alliance 6 (?)
Maharani	1. Lin Chan Chor	Alliance (MCA)	1,210	591	2. Chua Ang Teck	Socialist Front	619
Parit Stongkat	1. A. Latiff Omar	Alliance (UMNO)	1,042	330	2. Jailani A. Rahman	Socialist Front	712
Sultan Ibrahim	1. Anhari Abdullah	Alliance (UMNO)	1,020	529	2. Ismail Mohamed Salleh	Ind.	491
Temmenggong Ahmad	1. Mohamed Don Hannanudin; 2. Sulaiman Ninam Shah; 3. Khanif Da'adu	Alliance (UMNO); Alliance (UMNO); Alliance (UMNO)	962; 941; 921	21	4. Mohamed Jonit; 5. Mohamed Don Mohamed Noh; 5. Yahya Shah D. Nuscan	Parti Negara; Parti Negara; Parti Negara	752; 748; 748

=== Bandar Penggaram, Batu Pahat ===
Date: 7 December 1958; Electorate: Turnout:
Wards	Elected councillor	Elected party	Votes	Majority	Opponent(s)	Party	Votes
Alliance 3 (?)
Gunong Soga	1. Mohamed Noh Juma'at	Alliance (UMNO)	Unopposed				
Jalan Sultanah	1. Abdul Rahman Mustaffa	Alliance (UMNO)	2,147	1,452	Tsang Mee Hong	Ind.	695
Kampong Petani	1. Kang Kok Seng	Alliance (MCA)	Unopposed				

=== Besut ===
Date: 21 March 1958; Electorate: Turnout:
Wards	Elected councillor	Elected party	Votes	Majority	Opponent(s)	Party	Votes
?
Jerteh	1. 2. 3.				Abdul Wahid Mohamed; Jadir Mohd. Shah; Teo Aik Ann; Wan Mustaffa Wan Yusoff	Ind. Alliance (UMNO); Alliance (MCA); Alliance (UMNO)	
Kampong Raja	1. 2. 3.				Ismail Yusof; Mohamed Sauzi Hussein; Wan Isahak Ali; Wan Ismail Ali	Alliance (UMNO); Ind. Alliance (UMNO); Alliance (UMNO)	
Kuala Besut	1. 2. 3.				Hashim Hassan; Ibrahim Ahmad; Mohd. Amin Jusho; Mohd. Nor Ismail; Wan Ali Jusoh; Yusoff Abas	Alliance (UMNO); Alliance (UMNO); Alliance (UMNO); Partai Ra'ayat; Partai Ra'ayat; Partai Ra'ayat	

=== Bukit Mertajam ===
Date: Electorate: Turnout:
Wards	Elected councillor	Elected party	Votes	Majority	Opponent(s)	Party	Votes
?
	1.						
	1.						

=== Butterworth ===
Date: Electorate: Turnout:
Wards	Elected councillor	Elected party	Votes	Majority	Opponent(s)	Party	Votes
?
	1.						
	1.						

=== Ipoh-Menglembu ===
Date: 6 December 1958; Electorate: Turnout:
Wards	Elected councillor	Elected party	Votes	Majority	Opponent(s)	Party	Votes
PPP 4 (6) | Alliance 0 (5) | NAP 0 (1)
Green Town	1. Khong Kok Yat	PPP			Chan Kok Keong; Leong Ah Kow	Alliance (MCA); NAP	
Menglembu	1. Choy Kok Kuan	PPP			Lean Chor Kow; Lee Koon Voon	NAP; Alliance (MCA)	
Pasir Puteh	1. C.. H. Yin	PPP			Laily Mariam Sulaiman; Mohamed Yusoff Abdul Samad	Alliance (MCA); NAP	
Silibin	1. Hor Hock Lung	PPP			Ng Ah Leng; S. Nalliah; Too Joon Ting	NAP; Ind. Alliance (MCA)	

=== Johore Bahru ===
Date: 6 December 1958; Electorate: 12,889; Turnout: 64%
Wards	Elected councillor	Elected party	Votes	Majority	Opponent(s)	Party	Votes	Turnout
Alliance 2 (10) | Socialist Front 1 (1) | Parti Negara 1 (1)
Ayer Molek	1. Lee Chin Ngiah	Alliance (MCA)	1,148	130	2. Chu Choon Yong; 3. Wan Mohamed Ibrahim	Labour; Parti Negara	1,018; 861	67.27%
Nong Chik	1. Anwar Abdul Malek	Parti Negara	881	66	2. Abdullah Abdul Rahman	Alliance (UMNO)	815	62%
Tampoi	1. Abu Bakar Mohamed Salleh	Socialist Front	779	41	2. Harun Hassan	Alliance (UMNO)	738	73.45%
Tebrau	1. Ghani Busu	Alliance (UMNO)	989	51	2. Zainal Abidin Mohamed	Parti Negara	938	57.2%

=== Kampar ===
Date: Electorate: Turnout: nil
Wards	Elected councillor	Elected party	Votes	Majority	Opponent(s)	Party	Votes
Alliance 3 (?)
Central	1.	Alliance	Unopposed				
North	1.	Alliance	Unopposed				
South	1.	Alliance	Unopposed				

=== Klang ===
Date: 6 December 1958; Electorate: Turnout:
Wards	Elected councillor	Elected party	Votes	Majority	Opponent(s)	Party	Votes
Alliance 3 (?)
Klang North	1.	Alliance	Unopposed				
Klang South	1.	Alliance	Unopposed				
Port Swettenham	1. Abdullah Hassan	Alliance (UMNO)	759	445	2. Lim Sian Loke	Socialist Front	314

=== Kluang ===
Date: 1 November 1958; Electorate: Turnout:
Wards	Elected councillor	Elected party	Votes	Majority	Opponent(s)	Party	Votes
?
Gunong Lambak	1. Woo See Tiam		Unopposed				
Mengkibol	1.				Chiam Teck Kwee; Hussin Omar; Foo Kay Han; Awang Noh		
Mesjid Lama	1. 2.				Md. Zain Mohamed; Lee Ah Leng; Ismail Kassim; Mohamed A. Manan; Mohd Shariff Hussein @ Yasin; Mohd Fadhir @ C. P. Ditmarsch		

=== Kota Bharu ===
Date: 5 July 1978; Electorate: Turnout:
Wards	Elected councillor	Elected party	Votes	Majority	Opponent(s)	Party	Votes
?
Kubang Pasu	1.				Mohd. Daud Salleh; Nik Ismail Nik Hussin		
Kota Lama	1.				Hassan Ya'acob; Wan Hassan Wan Abdullah		
Wakaf Pasu	1.				Abdul Hamid Mohamed; Abdul Hamid Ya'acob		

=== Kuala Kangsar ===
Date: Electorate: Turnout: nil
Wards	Elected councillor	Elected party	Votes	Majority	Opponent(s)	Party	Votes
Alliance 3 (?)
Idris	1.	Alliance	Unopposed				
Kangsar	1.	Alliance	Unopposed				
Kenas	1.	Alliance	Unopposed				

=== Kuala Pilah ===
Date: 14 June 1958; Electorate: Turnout:
Wards	Elected councillor	Elected party	Votes	Majority	Opponent(s)	Party	Votes
?
Bukit Temensu	1.						
Kampong Dioh	1.						
Pekan Lama	1.						

=== Kuala Trengganu ===
Date: 17 February 1958; Electorate: 2,855; Turnout:
Wards	Elected councillor	Elected party	Votes	Majority	Opponent(s)	Party	Votes
Alliance ?
Kuala	1.				Wan Mohamed Mahmood; Mohamed Taib Ismail	Alliance (UMNO); Parti Negara	

Date: 1 December 1958; Electorate: Turnout:
Wards	Elected councillor	Elected party	Votes	Majority	Opponent(s)	Party	Votes	Electorate
Alliance ?
Bukit Besar	1.				Syed Hassan Al-Hadi Syed Sagoff; Zahid Safian Tawaf	Alliance (UMNO); Parti Negara		
Kuala	1.				Mohamed Osman; Mohamed Taib Ismail	Alliance (UMNO); Parti Negara		2,855
Ladang	1.				Wan Embong Wan Long; Mohamed Ali Awang Omar; Puteh Arshad	Alliance (UMNO); Parti Negara; Ind.		

=== Kuantan ===
Date: 1 March 1958; Electorate: Turnout:
Wards	Elected councillor	Elected party	Votes	Majority	Opponent(s)	Party	Votes
?
Central Town	1.						
Tanah Puteh	1.						
Telok Sisek	1.						

=== Mersing ===
Date: Electorate: Turnout:
Wards	Elected councillor	Elected party	Votes	Majority	Opponent(s)	Party	Votes
?
Mersing Darat	1. 2. 3.						
Sebrang Kanan	1. 2. 3.						
Sebrang Kiri	1. 2. 3.						

=== Pasir Mas ===
Date: Electorate: Turnout:
Wards	Elected councillor	Elected party
?
Lemal	1.	
Kampong Bahru	1.	
Pengkalan Pasir	1.	

=== Pontian ===
Date: 8 November 1958; Electorate: Turnout:
Wards	Elected councillor	Elected party	Votes	Majority	Opponent(s)	Party	Votes
?
Bakek	1. 2. 3.						
Jalan Mesjid	1. 2. 3.						
Pantai	1. 2. 3.						

=== Raub ===
Date: 6 December 1958; Electorate: Turnout:
Wards	Elected councillor	Elected party
?
Raub Australian Gold Mine	1.	
Raub Town	1.	
Sempalit	1.	
Tanjong Gadong	1.	

=== Segamat ===
Date: 1 November 1958; Electorate: Turnout:
Wards	Elected councillor	Elected party	Votes	Majority	Opponent(s)	Party	Votes
?
Buloh Kasap	1.				Elias Abu Bakar; K. Ponniah		
Gemereh	1.						
Genuang	1.						

=== Seremban ===
Date: 6 December 1958; Electorate: Turnout:
Wards	Elected councillor	Elected party	Votes	Majority	Opponent(s)	Party	Votes
Socialist Front 1 (?) | Independent 1 (?) | ?
Lake	1.						
Lobak	1. Ong Ah Sai	Ind.					
Rahang	1.						
Temiang	1.						

=== Sungei Patani ===
Date: Electorate: Turnout:
Wards	Elected councillor	Elected party
?
Pekan Bahru	1.	
Pekan Lama	1.	
Rural	1.	

=== Taiping ===
Date: 6 December 1958; Electorate: Turnout:
Wards	Elected councillor	Elected party	Votes	Majority	Opponent(s)	Party	Votes
Alliance-NAP 6 (?)
Assam Kumbang	1. Raja Ba'ayah Raja Ya'acob	Alliance-NAP	425	129	2. Pho Kim Chiang; 3. Mohamed Tahir Abdul Rauf	Labour; Ind.	296; 170
Klian Pau	1. Mohamed Ismail Abdullah	Alliance-NAP	612	277	2. N. M. Krishnan	Labour	335
Town	1. Edward Ferdinand Pasqual	Alliance-NAP	678	254	2. Ng Guan Leng	Labour	424
Tupai	1. Kee Cheng Hoe; 2. Rustim Manecksha; 3. Ng Say Choon	Alliance-NAP; Alliance-NAP; Alliance-NAP	631; 589; 563	42	4. Ng Lai Hua; 5. Richard Ho; 6. Thuraiappa Markandu	Labour; Labour; Labour	438; 435; 423

=== Tanjong Malim ===
Date: 11 January 1958; Electorate: Turnout:
Wards	Elected councillor	Elected party	Votes	Majority	Opponent(s)	Party	Votes
Alliance 9 (9)
Beirop	1. Lee Seck Fun; 2. Surjan Singh; 3. Sulaiman Hj. Annuar	Alliance (MCA); Alliance (MIC); Alliance (UMNO)	Unopposed				
Idris	1. Abdul Majid Ariffin; 2. Yang Abdul Rashid Abdul Wahab; 3. Eva Jenny Mangalamoni Jothi	Alliance (UMNO); Alliance (UMNO); Alliance (MIC)			4. Tan Boon Jin	Independent	
Malacca	1. Mohamed Shariff Sujad; 2. Tan Chong Hong; 3. Chin Leng	Alliance (UMNO); Alliance (MCA); Alliance (MCA)	Unopposed				

Date: Electorate: Turnout:
Wards	Elected councillor	Elected party	Votes	Majority	Opponent(s)	Party	Votes
?
Beirop	1.						
Idris	1.						
Malacca	1.						

=== Tapah ===
Date: ~~11 January 1958~~; Electorate: Turnout: nil
Wards	Elected councillor	Elected party	Votes	Majority	Opponent(s)	Party	Votes
Alliance 9 (9)
Kampong Datoh	1. Ng Eng Hoe; 2. Anwar Abu Bakar; 3. Harun Mat Daai	Alliance (MCA); Alliance (UMNO); Alliance (UMNO)	Unopposed				
Station Road	1. Hor Seng; 2. S. Anthony Muthu; 3. Ismail Ali	Alliance (MCA); Alliance (MIC); Alliance (UMNO)	Unopposed				
Temoh Road	1. Thum Yeng Yong; 2. V. Ponnusamy Pillay; 3. Tamby Buyong	Alliance (MCA); Alliance (MIC); Alliance (UMNO)	Unopposed				

Date: 6 December 1958; Electorate: Turnout:
Wards	Elected councillor	Elected party	Votes	Majority	Opponent(s)	Party	Votes
Alliance 3 (9)
Kampong Datoh	1. Ng Eng Hoe	Alliance (MCA)	260	171	2. Zan Abu Kassim Mohd. Hashim	PMIP	89
Station Road	1. Hor Seng	Alliance (MCA)	353	301	2. Tan Guan Seng	PPP	52
Temoh Road	1. V. Ponnusamy Pillai	Alliance (MIC)	276	192	2. J. U. D. Moses	PPP	84

=== Teluk Anson ===
Date: Electorate: Turnout: nil
Wards	Elected councillor	Elected party	Votes	Majority	Opponent(s)	Party	Votes
Alliance 3 (?)
Changkat Jong	1.	Alliance	Unopposed				
Denison Road	1.	Alliance	Unopposed				
Pasir Bedamar	1.	Alliance	Unopposed				

=== Temerloh-Mentekab ===
Date: 30 December 1958; Electorate: Turnout:
Wards	Elected councillor	Elected party	Votes	Majority	Opponent(s)	Party	Votes
?
Mentekab North	1.						
Mentekab South	1.						
Temerloh North	1.				Goh Ann J. P. Zainal Abidin Ali		
Temerloh South	1.						

== Rural district council election ==
=== Alor Gajah ===
Date: 31 May 1958; Electorate: Turnout:
Wards	Elected councillor	Elected party	Votes	Majority	Opponent(s)	Party	Votes
Alliance 1 (?)
Lubok China	1. Abdul Ghani Long	Alliance (UMNO)					

=== Malacca Tengah ===
Date: 31 May 1958; Electorate: 19,071; Turnout:
Wards	Elected councillor	Elected party	Votes	Majority	Opponent(s)	Party	Votes
Alliance 6 (?)
Ayer Molek	1. Omar Abdul Rahman	Alliance (UMNO)					
Bukit Bahru	1. Zainal Nordin	Alliance (UMNO)					
Klebang Kechil	1. Omar Ahmad; 2. Teh Boon Seng	Alliance (UMNO); Alliance (MCA)					
Tanjong Kling	1. Abdul Rahman Mahyiddin; 2. Yahaya Salim	Alliance (UMNO); Alliance (UMNO)					
