= 1961 Malayan local elections =

Local elections were held in Malaya in 1961. They were dominated by the Alliance Party, which won 429 of the 578 seats available, 154 of which were uncontested.

== Results ==
State	Alliance			Socialist			PAS			PPP			Others			Total seats
State	Votes	%	Seats	Votes	%	Seats	Votes	%	Seats	Votes	%	Seats	Votes	%	Seats	Total seats
Johor		49.5	64			14			0			0			8	86
Kedah		50.1	33			7			0			0			1	41
Kelatan		62.2	51			0			14			0			1	66
Malacca		56.1	53			8			2			0			2	65
Negri Sembilan		32.4	12			2			0			0			10	24
Pahang		49.1	47			19			0			0			2	68
Penang		46.6	52			20			0			0			0	72
Perak		40.6	67			2			0			22			2	93
Perlis		66.4	12			0			0			0			0	12
Selangor		37.9	6			2			0			4			0	12
Trengganu		47.2	32			2			1			0			4	39
Total	–	–	429	–	–	76	–	–	17			26	–	–	30	561
Source: Silcock

Local elections were held in the Federation of Malaya in 1960.

== City council election ==
=== George Town ===
Barisan Sosialis won 14 of George Town's seats, with 1 going to the Alliance Party. This increased the socialists' majority, having previously held 7 seats, with Alliance holding 3 and independents holding 3.

Date: Electorate: Turnout:
Wards	Elected councillor	Elected party	Votes	Majority	Opponent(s)	Party	Votes
?
Jelutong	1.						
Kelawei	1.						
Sungei Pinang	1.						
Tanjong East	1.						
Tanjong West	1.						

== Municipal election ==
=== Kuala Lumpur ===
Date: Electorate: Turnout:
Wards	Elected councillor	Elected party	Votes	Majority	Opponent(s)	Party	Votes	Spoilt votes
?
Bangsar	1.							
Imbi	1.							
Petaling	1.							
Sentul	1.							

=== Malacca ===
Date: Electorate: Turnout:
Wards	Elected councillor	Elected party	Votes	Majority	Opponent(s)	Party	Votes	Spoilt votes
?
Bukit China	1.							
Fort	1.							
Mata Kuching	1.							
Tranquerah	1.							

== Town councils election ==
=== Alor Star ===
Date: Electorate: Turnout:
Wards	Elected councillor	Elected party	Votes	Majority	Opponent(s)	Party	Votes
?
Kampong	1.						
Pekan	1.						
Seberang	1.						

=== Bandar Maharani, Muar ===
Date: Electorate: Turnout:
Wards	Elected councillor	Elected party	Votes	Majority	Opponent(s)	Party	Votes
?
Maharani	1.						
Parit Stongkat	1.						
Sultan Ibrahim	1.						

=== Bandar Penggaram, Batu Pahat ===
Date: Electorate: Turnout:
Wards	Elected councillor	Elected party	Votes	Majority	Opponent(s)	Party	Votes
?
Gunong Soga	1.						
Jalan Sultanah	1.						
Kampong Petani	1.						

=== Bukit Mertajam ===
Date: Electorate: Turnout:
Wards	Elected councillor	Elected party	Votes	Majority	Opponent(s)	Party	Votes
?
	1.						
	1.						

=== Butterworth ===
Date: Electorate: Turnout:
Wards	Elected councillor	Elected party	Votes	Majority	Opponent(s)	Party	Votes
?
	1.						
	1.						

=== Ipoh-Menglembu ===
Date: Electorate: Turnout:
Wards	Elected councillor	Elected party	Votes	Majority	Opponent(s)	Party	Votes
?
Green Town	1.						
Menglembu	1.						
Pasir Puteh	1.						
Silibin	1.						

=== Johore Bahru ===
Date: Electorate: Turnout:
Wards	Elected councillor	Elected party	Votes	Majority	Opponent(s)	Party	Votes
?
Ayer Molek	1.						
Nong Chik	1.						
Tampoi	1.						
Tebrau	1.						

=== Kampar ===
Date: Electorate: Turnout:
Wards	Elected councillor	Elected party	Votes	Majority	Opponent(s)	Party	Votes
?
Central	1.						
North	1.						
South	1.						

=== Klang ===
Date: Electorate: Turnout:
Wards	Elected councillor	Elected party	Votes	Majority	Opponent(s)	Party	Votes
?
Klang North	1.						
Klang South	1.						
Port Swettenham	1.						

=== Kluang ===
Date: Electorate: 6,623; Turnout:
Wards	Elected councillor	Elected party	Votes	Majority	Opponent(s)	Party	Votes
Alliance 5 | Socialist Front 5 | Independent 2
Bakar Sampah	1. Lee Hie Siong	Alliance (MCA)	Unopposed				
Dorset	1. Mohamed Zain Mohamed	Socialist Front	Unopposed				
Haji Manan	1. Tan Khim Seck	Independent	560	185	1. Ong Yoke Eng	Alliance (MCA)	375
Jalan Mersing	1. Ng Ka Sik	Socialist Front	493	53	1. Foo Kay Han	Alliance (MCA)	440
Kampong Bahru	1. Mansor Haji Salleh	Socialist Front	Unopposed				
Lambak	1. Wee Lee Jin	Socialist Front	495	72	1. Lim Kim Guan	Alliance (MCA)	423
Mengkibol	1. Woo See Tiam	Alliance (MCA)	434	93	1. Zaharuddin bin Idris	Socialist Front	341
Mesjid Lama	1. Alwi Haji Tawal	Independent	Unopposed				
Pekan	1. Lee Ah Leng	Socialist Front (Labour)	455	132	1. Tiah Eng Bee	Alliance (MCA)	323
Sultanah	1. Siew Theng Yhoi	Alliance (MCA)	526	82	1. Ong Chu Tong	Socialist Front	444
Yap Tau Sah	1. Kong Eng Tow	Alliance (MCA)	Unopposed				
Yap Tau Sah Timor	1. Liu Han Siong	Alliance (MCA)	Unopposed				

=== Kota Bharu ===
Date: Electorate: Turnout:
Wards	Elected councillor	Elected party	Votes	Majority	Opponent(s)	Party	Votes
?
Kubang Pasu	1.						
Kota Lama	1.						
Wakaf Pasu	1.						

=== Kota Tinggi ===
Date: Electorate: 1,365; Turnout:
Wards	Elected councillor	Elected party	Votes	Majority	Opponent(s)	Party	Votes
Alliance 7 | Socialist Front 2
Bukit Kerajan	1. Syed Abu Bakar Abdullah	Alliance (UMNO)	Unopposed				
Jalan Besar	1. Chia Tu Siang	Alliance (MCA)	Unopposed				
Jalan Johore	1. Don Janes Musa	Socialist Front	108	38	Omar Ahmad	Alliance (UMNO)	70
Jalan Mawai	1. Pee Hock Chiam	Alliance (MCA)	Unopposed				
Kota Kechil Barat	1. Tan Seng Toon	Alliance (MCA)	Unopposed				
Kota Kechil Timor	1. Chia Ee Koh	Alliance (MCA)	143	67	1. Chia Chong Sing	Socialist Front	76
Sungei Kemang Selatan	1. Mohamad Abdullah	Socialist Front	176	67	1. Kelu Ramu	Alliance (MIC)	109
Sungei Kemang Utara	1. Shaikh Mohamed Zin	Alliance (UMNO)	92	16	1. Syed Abu Bakar Jaafar	Socialist Front	76
Tembioh	1. Sheikh Abdul Kadir Abdul Rahman	Alliance (UMNO)	89	7	1. Mohamed Asi Sino	Independent	82

=== Kuala Kangsar ===
Date: Electorate: Turnout:
Wards	Elected councillor	Elected party	Votes	Majority	Opponent(s)	Party	Votes
?
Idris	1.						
Kangsar	1.						
Kenas	1.						

=== Kuala Pilah ===
Date: Electorate: Turnout:
Wards	Elected councillor	Elected party	Votes	Majority	Opponent(s)	Party	Votes
?
Bukit Temensu	1.						
Kampong Dioh	1.						
Pekan Lama	1.						

=== Kuala Trengganu ===
Date: Electorate: Turnout:
Wards	Elected councillor	Elected party	Votes	Majority	Opponent(s)	Party	Votes
?
Bukit Besar	1.						
Kuala	1.						
Ladang	1.						

=== Kuantan ===
Date: Electorate: Turnout:
Wards	Elected councillor	Elected party	Votes	Majority	Opponent(s)	Party	Votes
?
Central Town	1.						
Tanah Puteh	1.						
Telok Sisek	1.						

=== Mersing ===
Date: Electorate: 1,049; Turnout:
Wards	Elected councillor	Elected party	Votes	Majority	Opponent(s)	Party	Votes
Alliance 7 | Independent 2
Bandar Utara	1. Lee Seng Koon	Alliance (MCA)	Unopposed				
Jalan Abdullah	1. Mohamed Salleh A. Rahman	Independent	208	89	1. Ahmad Haji Mohamed Noor	Alliance (UMNO)	119
Jalan Dato Timor	1. Poh Swee Toh	Alliance (MCA)	Unopposed				
Jalan Ismail	1. A. Ghani Alias	Alliance (UMNO)	Unopposed				
Jalan Jemeluang	1. Leong Keng Hon	Alliance (MCA)	Unopposed				
Kampong Tengah	1. Sulong Taib	Independent	172	77	1. Mohamed Yassin Ngah	Alliance (UMNO)	95
Kolam Ayer	1. Dennis Leong Teng Hoo	Alliance (MCA)	154	114	1. Othman Haji Ali	Independent	40
Sebrang Kanan	1. Sulaiman Andak	Alliance (UMNO)	Unopposed				
Sebrang Kiri	1. Azizah Ahmad	Alliance (UMNO)	Unopposed				

=== Pasir Mas ===
Date: Electorate: Turnout:
Wards	Elected councillor	Elected party
?
Lemal	1.	
Kampong Bahru	1.	
Pengkalan Pasir	1.	

=== Raub ===
Date: Electorate: Turnout:
Wards	Elected councillor	Elected party
?
Raub Australian Gold Mine	1.	
Raub Town	1.	
Sempalit	1.	
Tanjong Gadong	1.	

=== Segamat ===
Date: Electorate: Turnout:
Wards	Elected councillor	Elected party	Votes	Majority	Opponent(s)	Party	Votes
?
Buloh Kasap	1.						
Gemereh	1.						
Genuang	1.						

=== Seremban ===
Date: Electorate: Turnout:
Wards	Elected councillor	Elected party	Votes	Majority	Opponent(s)	Party	Votes
?
Lake	1.						
Lobak	1.						
Rahang	1.						
Temiang	1.						

=== Sungei Patani ===
Date: Electorate: Turnout:
Wards	Elected councillor	Elected party
?
Pekan Bahru	1.	
Pekan Lama	1.	
Rural	1.	

=== Taiping ===
Date: Electorate: Turnout:
Wards	Elected councillor	Elected party	Votes	Majority	Opponent(s)	Party	Votes	Spoilt votes
?
Assam Kumbang	1.							
Kota	1.							
Klian Pauh	1.							

=== Tanjong Malim ===
Date: Electorate: Turnout:
Wards	Elected councillor	Elected party	Votes	Majority	Opponent(s)	Party	Votes
?
Beirop	1.						
Idris	1.						
Malacca	1.						

=== Tapah ===
Date: Electorate: Turnout:
Wards	Elected councillor	Elected party	Votes	Majority	Opponent(s)	Party	Votes
?
Kampong Datoh	1.						
Station Road	1.						
Temoh Road	1.						

=== Teluk Anson ===
Date: Electorate: Turnout:
Wards	Elected councillor	Elected party	Votes	Majority	Opponent(s)	Party	Votes
?
Changkat Jong	1.						
Denison Road	1.						
Pasir Bedamar	1.						

=== Temerloh-Mentekab ===
Date: Electorate: Turnout:
Wards	Elected councillor	Elected party	Votes	Majority	Opponent(s)	Party	Votes
?
Mentekab North	1.						
Mentekab South	1.						
Temerloh North	1.						
Temerloh South	1.						
