= Kampung Nong Chik =

Village in Johor Bahru, Johor, Malaysia

Coordinates: 1°28′11.3″N 103°44′15.2″E

Kampong Nong Chik or "Nong Chik Village" is a Malay neighbourhood located in the city of Johor Bahru, Johor, Malaysia.

Despite the name, the neighbourhood has not been a traditional village since the years before Malaysia gained independence in 1958, when government quarters were built. More recently these quarters have been demolished to make way for redevelopment. Situated just at the edge of Johor Baru city center, the old neighbourhood had the feel of a rural kampong with low density single-storey houses, mature trees, a prominent mosque, community center and kindergarten. However, the houses had become dilapidated. When the state government decided to move its administrative offices to Kota Iskandar, it also took steps to redevelop the land with more modern and higher density housing. In the latter part of 2009, the government quarters were demolished and work on the new houses began.

== Location ==
Kampong Nong Chik lies along the hill slope between Jalan Kolam Air to the west which runs parallel to Sungai Chat, Jalan Abdul Samad which passes along the ridge of the hill to the east, Taman Nong Chik with high end detached houses in the north and Aloha Towers – a luxury condominium – in the south. It is within a few kilometers of Johor Bahru city centre.

== Landmarks ==
In the vicinity of the Nong Chik neighbourhood is the Nong Chik mosque on the opposite side of Jalan Kolam Air, Maktab Sultan Abu Bakar (formerly English College – established in 1914), and several schools including the Queen Elizabeth School for the Blind (built in 1954).

== History ==
Kampong Nong Chik lies on land first granted to a businessman of Arab descent by Sultan Abu Bakar (1833–1895). Syed Muhammd Alsagoff (1836–1906), also known as Nong Chik, gave his name to the kampong that he established. Syed Mohamed Alsagoff was the grandson of Tuan Syed Abdul Rahman Alsagoff, an Arab businessman from Hadramaut in Yemen who came to the new British colony of Singapore with his son, Syed Ahmad, in 1824. Syed Abdul Rahman established Alsagoff & Company in Singapore in 1848 which traded in spices, rubber, sago, coffee, coco, pineapples and others. Apart from trading it also had a plantation, the largest sawmill in the region and the Straits Cycle & Motor Company.

When Syed Abdul Rahman died, all his business were inherited by Syed Ahmed Alsagoff. Syed Ahmed married Raja Siti, the daughter of Hajjah Fatimah of Sulawesi who was herself a rich business woman who owned many cargo ships. When Hajah Fatimah died, her business was run by her son-in-law Syed Ahmed, adding to his wealth. Syed Ahmed had nine girls and one boy. When he died in 1875, the family's wealth was passed down to Syed Mohamed Alsagoff in trust.

Syed Mohamed Alsagoff was close to Sultan Abu Bakar of Johor; apart from the Nong Chik land, he also received a large concession in Kukup. He set up Constantinople Estates which grew rubber, sago, cocoa and pepper. He even received permission from the Sultan to issue his own currency at the Constantinople Estate.

== Redevelopment ==
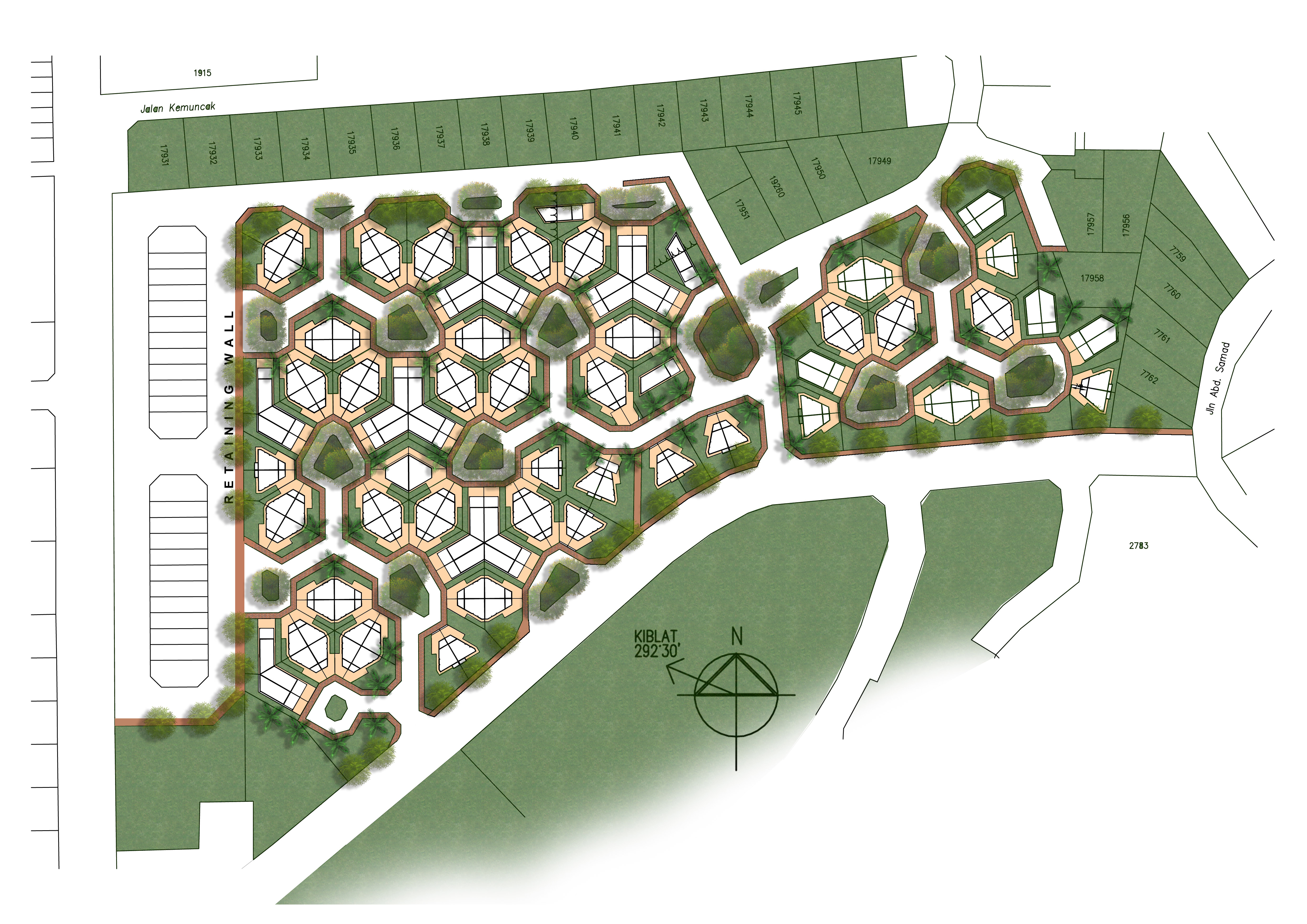
Honeycomb Layout Plan.

In 2009, 74 government quarters in the Nong Chik neighbourhood sitting on about 43 acres (170,000 m^{2}) of land were demolished to make way for redevelopment. The residents were relocated to new housing nearby or at the Johor State New Administrative Centre in Nusajaya. The redevelopment is part of a privatisation deal between a local developer, Mudra Tropika Sdn. Bhd. and the State Government of Johor.

The redevelopment includes 24 units of shop offices, 54 units of gallery shops and 40 units of bungalows and semi-detached houses. However, the most notable part of the development is the 168 units of "honeycomb housing", due for completion by late 2011, priced between RM295,000 and RM458,000. In this new layout, small groups of houses are laid out around communal courtyards in interconnected cul-de-sacs. Three new types of houses - the quadruplex, sextuplex and duplex houses – are introduced as alternatives to terrace houses, ubiquitous in Malaysia.

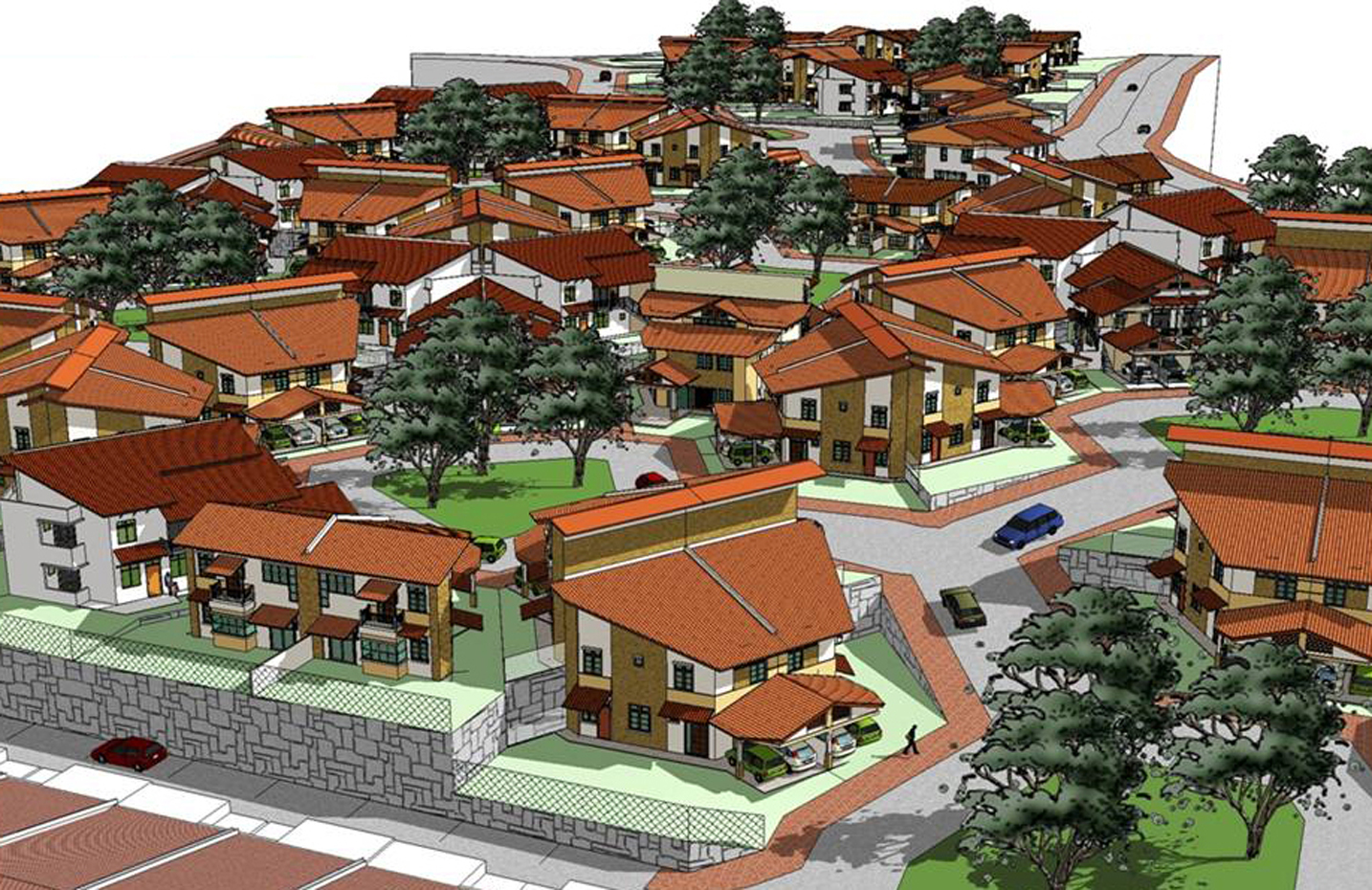
Bird's eye view.

According to a commentary: "…small groups of houses are laid out around a communal courtyard like friends sitting around a table. This makes it easy for neighbours to get to know each other. Strangers entering a cul-de-sac would feel that they were entering a semi-private area, and furthermore they would be easily recognized as strangers by the residents. It’s like that in the kampong, people know each other; it’s not uncommon to greet a stranger and to politely ask what brought him."

"The loops and bends in the roads leading to the houses, less than 25 metres in any straight stretch, slow down cars to a walking speed. Furthermore, with the Honeycomb layout, parents can easily oversee their children playing in the courtyard in front of each home. Indeed, there are many ‘eyes on the street’ that can deter unwanted behaviour."

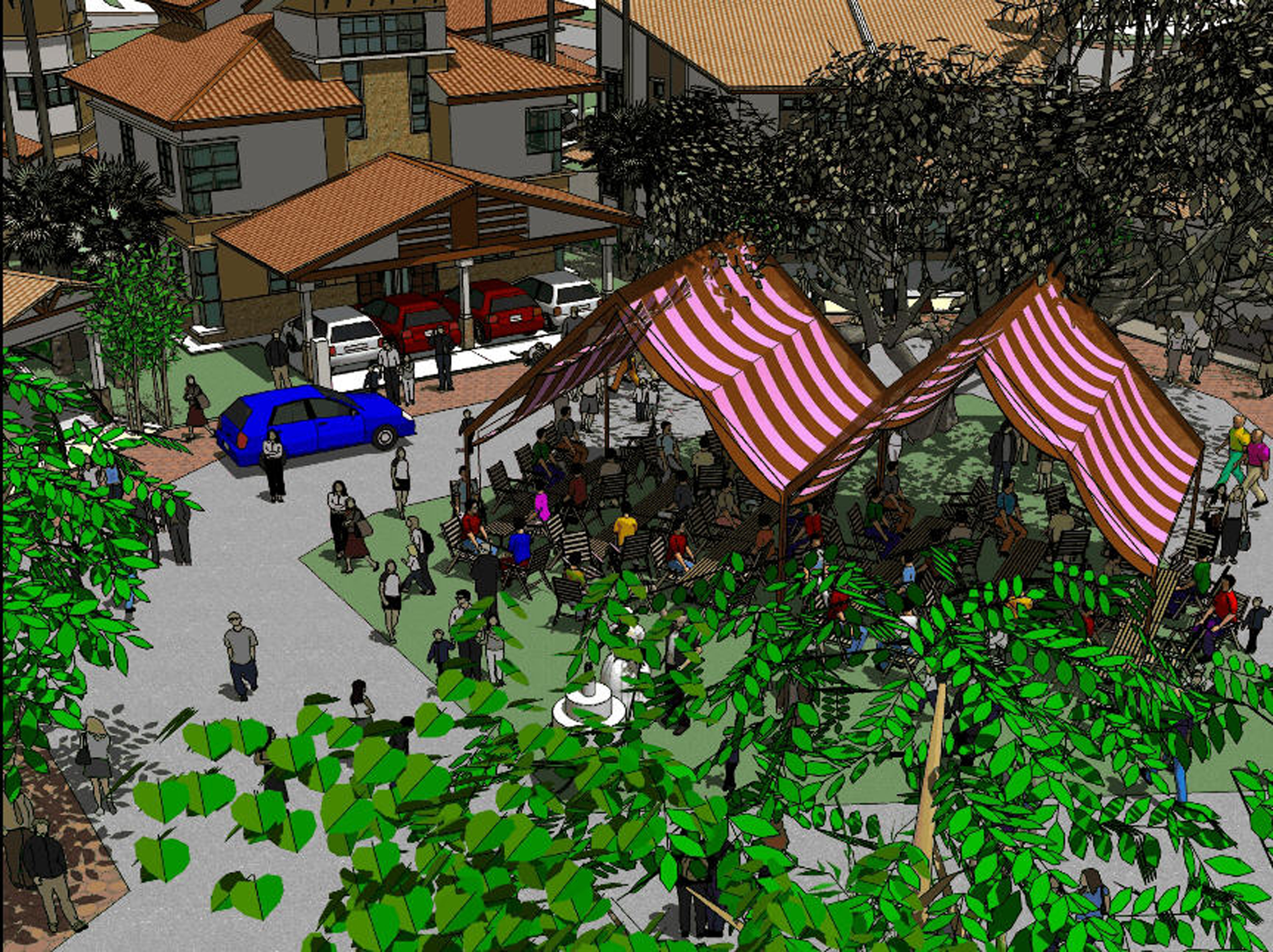
Communal event in Honeycomb courtyard.

“Giant, fast-growing trees will be planted in the courtyards to shade and cool the outdoors. All these factors will encourage parents to let their small children play outside.The courtyards not only serve as a recreational area, but are also suitable for weddings and any other community events".

These honeycomb houses, based on a patent pending invention will be the first of its kind in the world.

Phase 1 of the project was launched in the 3rd quarter of 2009 in the midst of a property market that was only starting to emerge from a recession. A property report declared that the development could be a challenge because of its novel design —neither a terraced nor a semi-detached housing development:

"Honeycomb housing is, as its name suggests, a cluster of houses built around each other like a beehive. A honeycomb housing layout promotes community living, but the design also ends up with odd corners in the house".

However, the developer declared by the end of 2009 that 60% of 120 units in Phase 1 had been sold.
