= Toni Kasim =

Malaysian human rights activist

Personal details
- Born: Zaitun Mohamed Kasim; 1966 Malaysia
- Died: 4 June 2008 (aged 41–42) Shah Alam, Selangor, Malaysia
- Citizenship: Malaysian
- Party: Independent
- Occupation: Human rights activist Politician

Zaitun 'Toni' Kasim (1966 – 4 June 2008) was a Malaysian human rights activist and politician. She was the first candidate to run for election under the Women's Candidacy Initiative, a group of Malaysian women activists. She was active with several sustainable development programmes including the Centre for Independent Journalism, Suara Rakyat Malaysia (SUARAM), Amnesty International and the All Women's Action Society (AWAM), as well as Sisters in Islam.

== Election results ==
Parliament of Malaysia
Year	Constituency	Opposition	Votes	Pct	Government	Votes	Pct	Ballots cast	Majority	Turnout
1999	Selayang, Selangor	Zaitun Kasim (DAP)	26,144	43%	Chan Kong Choy (MCA)	34,979	57%	63,275	8835	73.94%
