= All Women's Action Society =

Feminist organization

The All Women's Action Society (AWAM) is a feminist non-profit organization based in Malaysia. The organization was established in 1985 following a workshop held by the Joint Action Group. The group works on a local and national level to empower women and bring about social policy change.

== Mission ==
AWAM aims to create a society where all persons, particularly women, are treated equally. This includes advocating for policy changes to ensure women's rights and gender equality. Empowering women, facilitating social transformations, and supporting women facing crisis situations are other objectives of the organization.

== History ==
The All Women's Action Society was founded after the Joint Action Group held a two-day exhibition. This was a historic event that publicized the struggles women faced that were not talked about in the mainstream media. The members of AWAM have prided themselves on calling attention to, and providing a voice for victims of gender-based violence. One of the more groundbreaking achievements the organization has reached was the Domestic Violence Act of 1994. The act of 1994 made it illegal and punishable by law to commit violence against a victim regardless of relation or age. The All Women's Action Society also does outreach work to provide training courses in areas of gender inequality and violence. In addition, they help provide counseling services to victims of gender-based abuse. The organization founded a crisis line in 1997 under the name of Telenita. Since the founding of the organization, the mission took a more holistic approach. AWAM now also advocates for women to not only be free from gendered violence, but to be aware and awarded their rights. The society felt it was important to address all concerns and challenges women face in order to operate as a feminist organization. This shift prompted the organization to revisit its values as an institution. In 2009, members of the group created a set of core values that they would uphold in daily operations and the long term mission. Justice, equality, compassion and respect, collectivism, courage, and integrity were deemed all key values for the organization.

== Structure ==
AWAM works on the local and national level. The organization has a small staff that coordinates projects along with volunteers and associates. There is a focus on collectivism and open participation. Within the organization there is a Working Collective which holds monthly meetings to assess the direction AWAM is heading. The executive committee for All Women's Action Society is chosen through an election process that takes place every other year. The elected members have a two-year period of service before they are reelected. The organization also contains five different functioning portfolios: Advocacy and Networking, Information and Communications, Organisational Development, Public Education and Training, and Services. These are run by the staff and function to provide support and carry out operational goals and tasks.

== Campaigns ==
=== Past ===
A couple years after the organization was founded the organization participated in demonstrations and worked to raise awareness of rape after a nine-year-old girl, Ang May Hong, was assaulted. An action initiative titled Citizens Against Rape (CAR) was launched in response. In 1989, the organization fought for political action against violence on women. The organization prepared a campaign kits for gendered violence and supported candidates such as Toni Kasim in their campaigns. The advocacy proved by AWAM benefited candidates in gaining momentum on gendered topics. Later that year a workshop was held to work on drafting a Domestic Violence Act which was eventually passed in 1994. AWAM revived the spirit of CAR in 2003 in response to the rape and murder of Canny Ong. The goal was to bring about a local and collective movement by Malaysians to reduce the incidence of rape.

In June 2013, AWAM launched another ongoing nationwide campaign against domestic violence. In this launch of the campaign the organization brought important service providers into the movement. They included hospitals, police, and the welfare department. This measure was done to ensure during the education of the campaign they would be able to provide resources to those affected. In December 2013, on Human Rights Day, AWAM released a video titled Domestic Violence Hurts Families. The video shows the harm family violence can bring, and how the community is and can be involved. Since AWAM shifted their focus to a more holistic approach they often advocated for community involvement and also for rights unrelated to gendered violence. They continuously call the government to address larger issues such as foreign workers rights such as maids.

=== Present ===
At the beginning of the COVID-19 pandemic, in April 2020, the Malaysian government published posters on Facebook and Instagram with recommendations on how to cope with the pandemic. The posters, which had the hashtag #WomenPreventCovid19, advised women to not nag their husbands during lockdown and to dress up at home. Nisha Sabanayagam, spokesperson for AWAM, told Reuters, "(It) is extremely condescending both to women and men. These posters promote the concept of gender inequality and perpetuate the concept of patriarchy." After online ridicule, the Ministry for Women, Family and Community Development removed the posters.

In June 2021, AWAM called on the Malaysia government to convene parliament and said the country's state of emergency should not continue past August 2021. The organization, working with other Malaysian NGOs, published recommendations for the government regarding COVID-19 recovery and called attention to various societal issues the pandemic exacerbated, such as children's education.

== Training ==
The AWAM facilitates training sessions for gender sensitization, sexual harassment, rape awareness, leadership, and political participation. They train a variety of workers in various institutions such as banks, colleges, hospitals, and churches. The training sessions can be requested by any organization and they offer customized sessions.
