= Sisters in Islam =

Malaysian Islamic feminist civil society organisation

Sisters in Islam SIS (SIS Forum Malaysia)
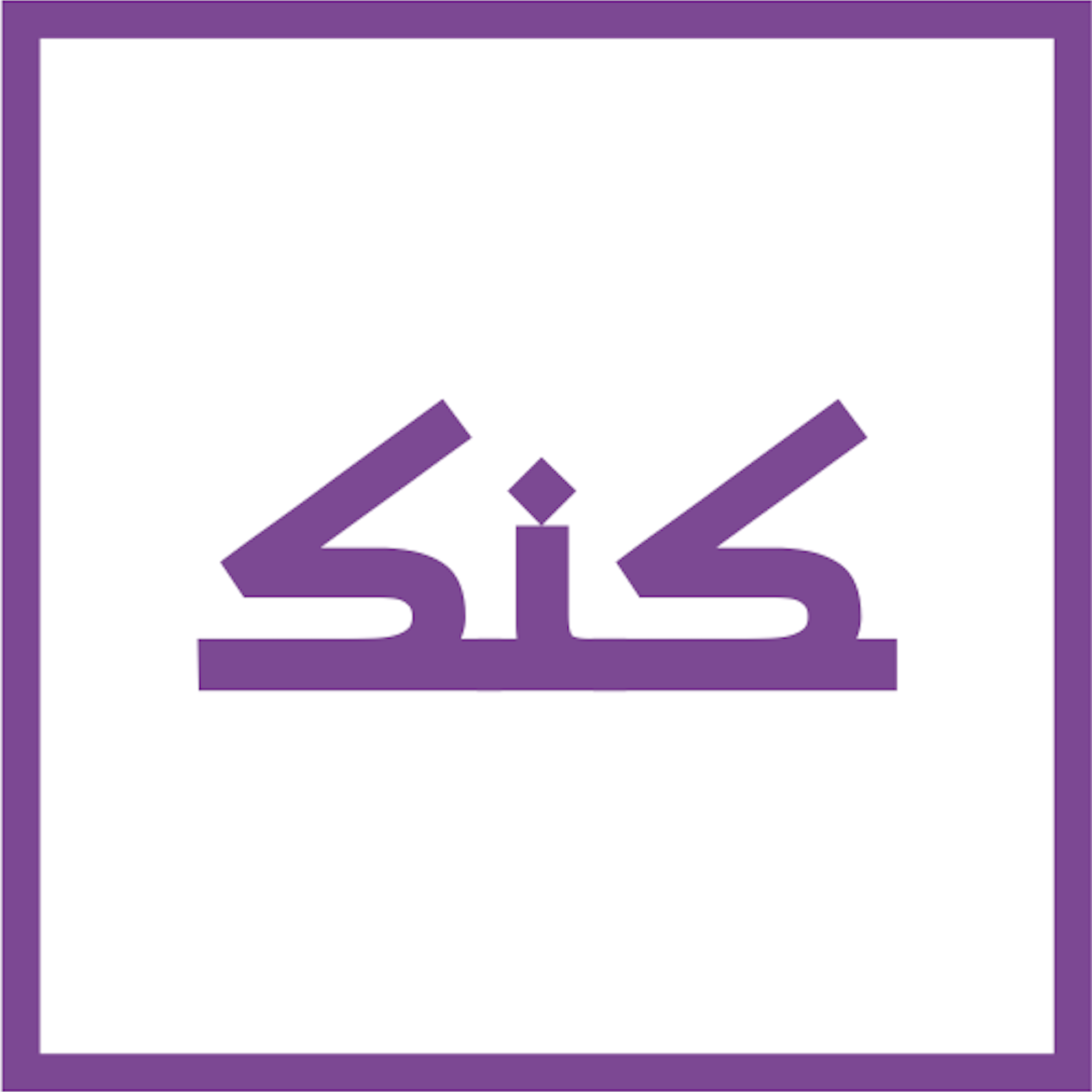
- Formation: 1988; 38 years ago
- Founder: Zainah Anwar, Amina Wadud, Askiah Adam, Norani Othman, Rashidah Abdullah, Rose Ismail and Sharifah Zuriah Aljeffri
- Type: Non-profit; NGO
- Purpose: Promotes the rights of women under the framework of Islam
- Headquarters: Petaling Jaya, Selangor Darul Ehsan, Malaysia
- Location: Petaling Jaya, Selangor, Malaysia
- Region served: Malaysia
- Executive Director: Rozana Isa
- Key people: Zainah Anwar (Co-founder)
- Website: https://sistersinislam.org

Sisters in Islam (SIS) is a Malaysian registered company committed to promoting the rights of women in Malaysia. Its efforts to promote the rights of Muslim women are based on the principles of equality, justice and freedom enjoined by the Quran. SIS work focuses on challenging laws and policies made in the name of Islam that discriminate against women. As such it tackles issues covered under Malaysia's Islamic family and sharia laws, such as polygamy, child marriage, moral policing, Islamic legal theory and jurisprudence, the hijab and modesty, violence against women and hudud. It is noted for its Islamic feminist research and advocacy.

Its head office is in Petaling Jaya.

== History ==
SIS was formed in 1988 and registered as a non-governmental organisation in 1993 under the name SIS Forum Malaysia. The name Sisters in Islam is retained as an authorship name. The organization takes an hermeneutical approach, working to advance the rights of Malaysian Muslim women by sharing its interpretation of the Quran. SIS teaches that, according to Islam, women are equally deserving of and guaranteed justice, mercy, and equal rights.

In 1987, a group of eight women met as the shariah subcommittee of the Association of Women Lawyers to look into problems with the implementation of Islamic Family Law, later evolving into a study group to read and analyze the Quran. They were a group of professional women, consisting of lawyers, journalists, university lecturers, and women’s rights activists. Upon their closer reading of the Quran, they began to question the legal system of the shariah courts, and the basis upon which prominent legislation like Islamic Family Law was based upon.

Sisters in Islam was co-founded by seven women: Zainah Anwar, Amina Wadud, Askiah Adam, Norani Othman, Rashidah Abdullah, Rose Ismail and Sharifah Zuriah Aljeffri. Other members have included activists such as Toni Kasim. According to Anwar, the women of the study group became empowered, having found that upon closer inspection, “women’s rights were rooted in [the] tradition, in [the] faith.”

== Zainah Anwar ==
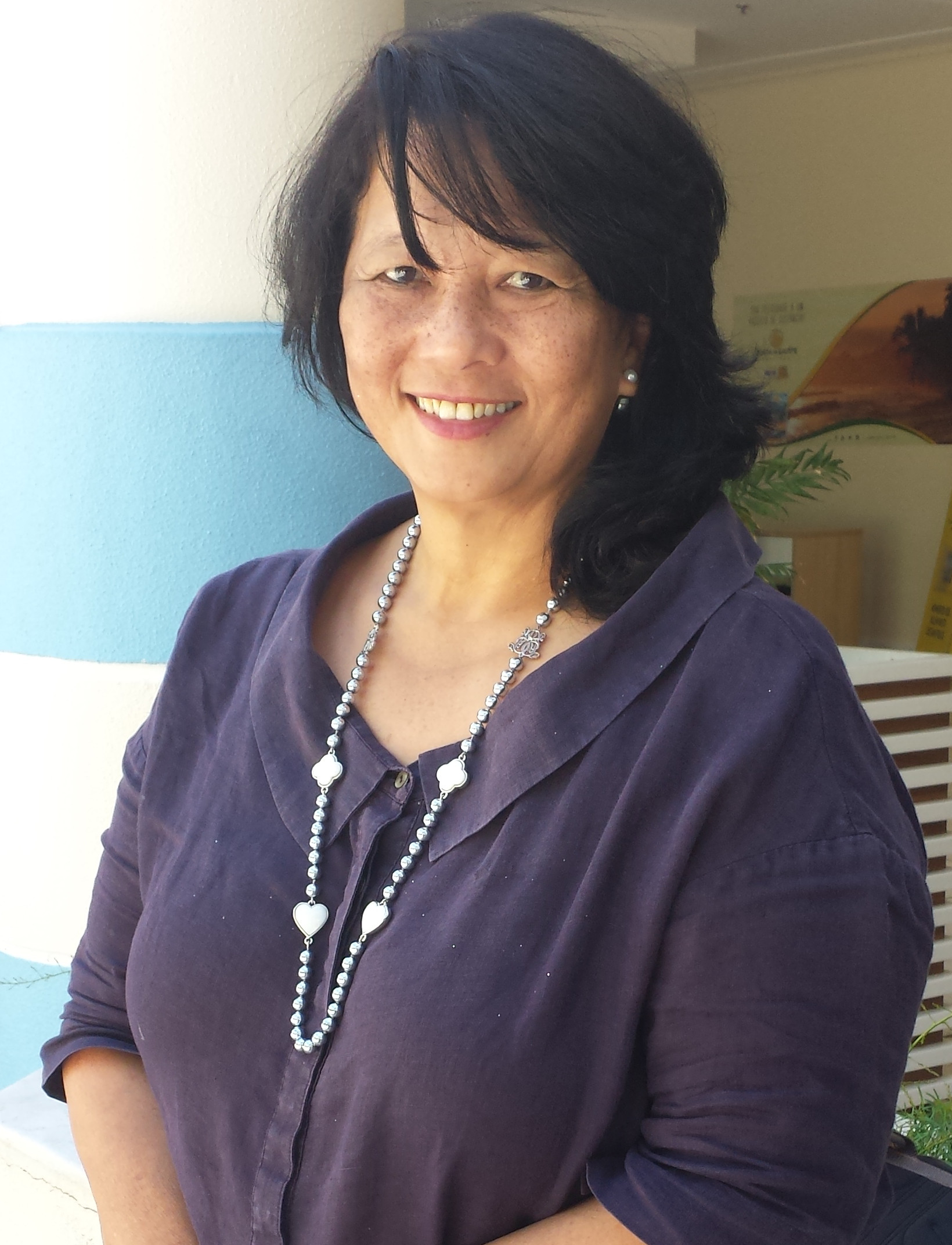
Zainah Anwar, Co-Founder

Zainah Anwar co-founded two (2) ground-breaking women's group that engage with Islam from a right's perspective to promote equality and justice for women living in Muslim context.

In 1987, she co-founded Sisters in Islam (SIS) in Malaysia and became its founding Executive Director from 1999-2008. She “has enjoyed a highly visible and public position” as the head of SIS, leading the organization to prominence in the Muslim world, attributed to her outspoken “personality and passion.” Anwar is the daughter of Anwar bin Abdul Malik, one of the founding members of United Malays National Organization (UMNO), credited for giving the organization its name; despite his lack of greater political participation in the party, this reflects Anwar’s own political background and upbringing, as a politically conscious daughter of one of the founding nationalist parties of the country.

Anwar also co-founded Musawah, the global movement for equality and justice in the Muslim family, and was its founding Executive Director from 2009-2021. She now sits on its Board. In 2007, SIS formed a coalition of scholars and activists from around the world, including Egypt, the Gambia, Indonesia, Iran, Morocco, Nigeria, Pakistan, Qatar, Turkey, the UK, and Malaysia, to create a universal document called the “Musawah Framework for Action”, which built a global model for Muslim women in their respective country’s to campaign and advocate for Muslim family and marriage law.

In 2018, Anwar was honored by Harvard Law School as one of the 25 “Women Aspiring Change” globally in the areas of law and policy. And in 2019, Anwar received the United Nations Malaysia Award 2019 for contributions to the 2030 Agenda for Sustainable Development in the Human Rights Fundamental Freedoms category. In 2023, Anwar was selected into the Muslim 500 2024: The World’s 500 Most Influential Muslims.

Anwar has also been named by Newsweek and The Daily Beast as one of 150 women “who shake the world”. Women Deliver has also called her one of 100 most inspiring people in championing the rights of women and girls, and by the online International Museum of Women as one of the 10 Most Influential Muslim Women at the Global Level.

== Rozana Isa ==
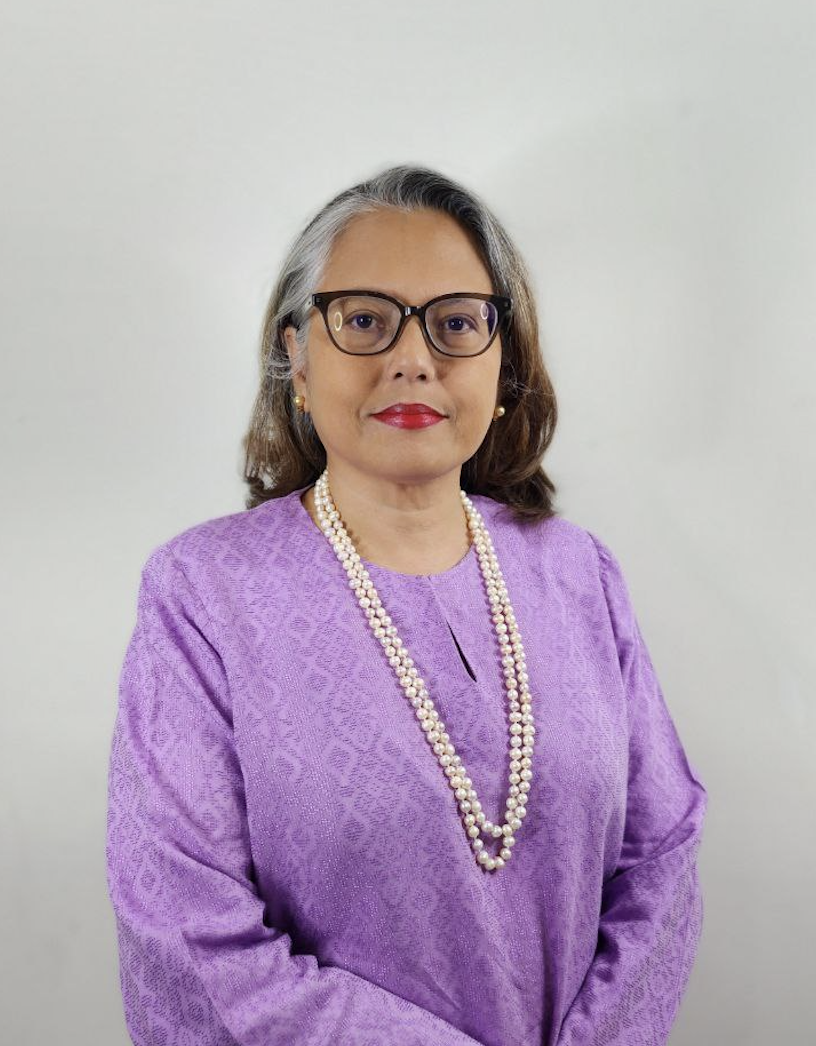
SIS Executive Director, Rozana Isa

Rozana Isa currently serves as the Executive Director for Sisters in Islam, a Malaysian NGO working on women’s rights within the framework of Islam. She joined the Malaysian women’s rights movement in 1999 to address issues regarding violence against women. This exposed her to the challenges Muslim women face to have their rights recognized and exercised in the context of Islamisation within a democratic nation with parallel legal systems. She observes that while gender, ethnic, and religious diversities are acknowledged and sometimes celebrated in society, their rights as Malaysian citizens or as human beings generally are still strongly negated at different levels of policies, laws and practices. Before taking up SIS’ helm, Rozana worked in various national, regional, and international women’s rights organizations.

== Theology ==
According to Anwar, SIS' work is based on the ‘lived realities’ of Muslim women: “For most Muslim women… rejecting religion is not an option… and as believers [they] want to find libration, truth, and justice from within [their] own faith.” SIS operates on the idea that Islam is enough to find the “absolute moral and spiritual equality of women and men,” reflected in the changes over time in their theological approaches to the text.

First, SIS looked to the Quran to improve their legal understanding of Islamic legal code, starting with “iqraq (‘read,’ the first word revealed to the Prophet Muhammad…).” Anwar described how shariah law on polygamy in Malaysia was based on Surah an-Nisa (4:3) which says Muslim men can marry two to four women to care for them if they are orphaned, generally understood to mean that they are single, widowed, or lack financial support from male figures in their life. However, SIS points out that the proceeding verse (4:2) reads “if you fear you shall not be able to deal justly with [the] women, then marry only one… this will be best for you to prevent you from doing injustice.” This manner of literally reading and interpreting Islamic text revealed to founders like Anwar that key verses had been only partially interpreted or intentionally left out from legal code to oppress women. From this, SIS derived that polygamy should be conditional and not a guaranteed right of Muslim men, nor did the Quran actually promote monogamy.

Dr. Amina Wadud later introduced an hermeneutical approach to SIS. At the time of their founding, Wadud was a mufassira and professor in the Department of Revealed Knowledge and Comparative Religion at the International Islamic University in Kuala Lumpur. The group examined the language of the text and its syntactical and grammatical structure, and it looked at the text as a whole to understand its worldview. This combined methodology allowed an exciting interface to emerge between theology and interpretation on one hand, and daily realities of Muslim women within the contemporary socio-legal context on the other. Through this approach, SIS argued that moral values they found in their contextual examination of the Quran were “universal and eternal and…serve as [their] guide, rather than the cultural and historical specificities of seventh-century Arabia.” From this, SIS argues that polygamy was only justifiable under those specific historical conditions which are no longer relevant as women were now able to own property and care for themselves. Similarly, SIS tackled mandatory rulings on veiling for Muslim women, found in Surah al-Ahzab: “O Prophet! Tell thy wives and thy daughters and the believing women, that they should cast their outer garments over their persons (when abroad); that is most convenient, that they be known (as such) and not molested.” SIS argues that “at the time women on the roads were assumed to be slaves and thus could be harassed…” SIS also argues that Surah an-Nur which asks women to cover their hair and body to dress piously was because “ at that time [women wore dresses that had a deep cleavage which exposed their breasts…So, what al-Quran suggest is to dress modestly but not as a specific dress code.”

Underlying these activities was the firm belief that, as a concerned group working towards a better society, SIS could not isolate itself from the larger human rights and democratic movements in the country and the world. SIS began to engage with the constitutional framework of Malaysia and other democratic nations, studied international treaties like the Universal Declaration of Human Rights, and began networking with female Muslim activists in the region and the Middle East. From 2003-2006, SIS arranged international meetings, educational courses, and workshops on constitutional reform and women's rights with international activists, sending educational materials and engaging in discussion with Muslim women around the world. In 2003, the organization held its first international meeting in Bellagio, Italy, bringing together Muslim women from Southeast Asia, Iran, Turkey, and the Middle East to discuss political Islam and women’s rights, sparking the beginnings of Musawah.

== Activities ==
SIS areas of work have expanded to encompass larger issues of democracy, human rights and constitutionalism, as well as urging the observance of human rights principles and international treaties and conventions signed by the Malaysian Government. They conduct advocacy through three (3) main avenues: legal consultation, legal reform advocacy, and education.

SIS provides free legal consultation through its clinic, Telenisa, founded in 2003. Its mission is to provide legal help and consultation “in matters related to issues related to Shariah Islamic Family Law such as divorce, polygamy, alimony of wife and children, matrimonial property and others.” Since its founding, it has served over 10,000 clients, predominantly Malaysian Muslim women, but also men and overseas clients. With their origins in legal interpretation, they educate women on their rights according to the Constitution, provide psychological counseling to women suffering from domestic violence, and also serve as legal representatives in court.

SIS advocates for legal reform and public policy changes in Malaysia, specifically addressing discriminatory policy in the country’s shariah law system. Through memorandums to the governments, newspaper publications, meetings with politicians, radio interviews, and voting drives, SIS has combatted legislation they have deemed discriminatory to Muslim women. Since 1993, they have argued against the inhumane punishments for women under the Kelantan Shariah Criminal Code (the Hudud Law) which legalized discriminatory punishments for Muslim women who converted out of the faith. In 1994, they publicly challenged the Domestic Violence Act, which protects Muslim men who domestically abuse their wives in the name of religion. Their most famous and notable public battle has been in challenge to Malaysia’s Islamic Family Law, which allows for polygamy (as in, taking wives for desire rather than the basis of providing for multiple women), which SIS argues makes it easier for men to divorce dependent wives, and discriminates towards women with strict punishments for dress code violations. In other legal battles, SIS has worked to ensure that caring for illegitimate children does not fall just to women and has worked to end child marriage. They argue that all interpretations of the Quran and its legal codes by mujtahids were their own interpretations, which cannot be enforced by a democratic government that represents human rights before it represents religious ones.

SIS works to educate Muslim and non-Muslim women in Malaysia and around the world on their rights and the theological arguments of the Quran that protect their rights and validate their equality, through pamphlets, books, online publications, workshops, international meetings, and more. Dawrah Fiqh Concerning Women: Manual for A Course on Islam and Gender, is an example of their transnational work in Islamic education reform. It cites arguments made by SIS on the interpretation and meaning of Quranic verses relevant to gender equality, citing their workshops and published manuals such as “Workshop Advanced Training on [Shariah] Law, Gender, and Human Rights,” “Islamic Family Law and Justice for Muslim Women,” and their book, Islam, Reproductive Health, and Women’s Rights (2000). SIS aims to transform public and private perceptions of gender and equality in Islam for a public audience but also in an educational manner for Muslim women, teaching them about their rights and dignities through a faith-based lens.

== Funding ==
SIS is registered as a tax-exempt non-profit organization. In 2023, the European Union donated 79.5 billion euros to SIS, through their Neighborhood, Development, and International Cooperation Instrument which gives “financial assistance to civil society organizations outside Europe with the aim, among others, of promoting ‘human rights and democracy.’" Other times, prominent female politicians such as the Minister for Women have made public displays of donating to SIS, advocating for legal reform regarding Muslim women. “For the first 11 years of its existence,” SIS members worked without pay, sustained by “love, passion, and emotional and financial support from family and friends.” In 1998, the organization was able to set up an office with paid staff. As the organization has developed into the modern day, SIS’s work has been shaped and enabled by its upper-middle-class status.

== Controversies ==
SIS has drawn criticism from conservative Muslim state and non-state actors because of its views. Its position, for example, in promoting monogamy as a Quranic ideal, was challenged by the Department of Islamic Development (JAKIM). The group has also drawn the ire of the Pan-Malaysian Islamic Party (PAS) for criticising PAS' Kelantan Syariah Criminal Bill (H) 1993 on the basis that it discriminated against Malaysian women and imposed the death penalty for apostasy. PAS, in 2009, called for SIS to be investigated and for its members to be "rehabilitated".

In 2010, Malaysian Assembly of Mosque Youth (MAMY) brought a lawsuit against Sisters in Islam, alleging the misuse of the word "Islam" in the organization's name. The High Court, however, struck out the application. Other right wing groups have alleged that Sisters in Islam misinterprets religious principles in response to SIS' efforts to stop authorities from caning a woman who was sentenced by the Syariah Court for drinking beer in public.

In 2014, the Selangor Islamic Religious Council (MAIS) issued a fatwa declaring that Sisters In Islam, as well as any other organisation promoting religious liberalism and pluralism, deviate from the teachings of Islam. According to the edict, publications that are deemed to promote liberal and pluralistic religious thinking are to be declared unlawful and confiscated, while social media is also to be monitored and restricted. As fatwas are legally binding once gazetted, SIS began challenging it on constitutional grounds since 2014.

In 2025, 11 years later, the Federal Court of Malaysia in a 3-1 majority decision ruled in favour of SIS and partially quashed the Selangor fatwa. The court ruled that SIS as a company is not a natural person and has no capacity to "profess the religion of Islam", or to "repent" as suggested by the fatwa, therefore the edict does not apply to SIS or any other organisations. The court said the fatwa only applies to single individuals who are real human. It also said that the Selangor fatwa committee has no power to direct federal agencies such as MCMC to censor materials relating to SIS, as it intruded into federal power and federal law, where the state religious authority has no jurisdiction of.

Following the court ruling, SIS has hailed it as a milestone in keeping religious authorities accountable to the constitution and rule of law. It also said the court's decision is "a win for all Malaysians who believe in due process, democratic oversight, and the inclusive spirit of Islam".

== See also ==
- Aurat (Malay language)
- Feminism in Malaysia
- Gerwani
- Hermeneutics of feminism in Islam
- Musawah
- Women in Malaysia
- Zainah Anwar
