= Zainah Anwar =

Malaysian NGO leader, activist, Muslim feminist

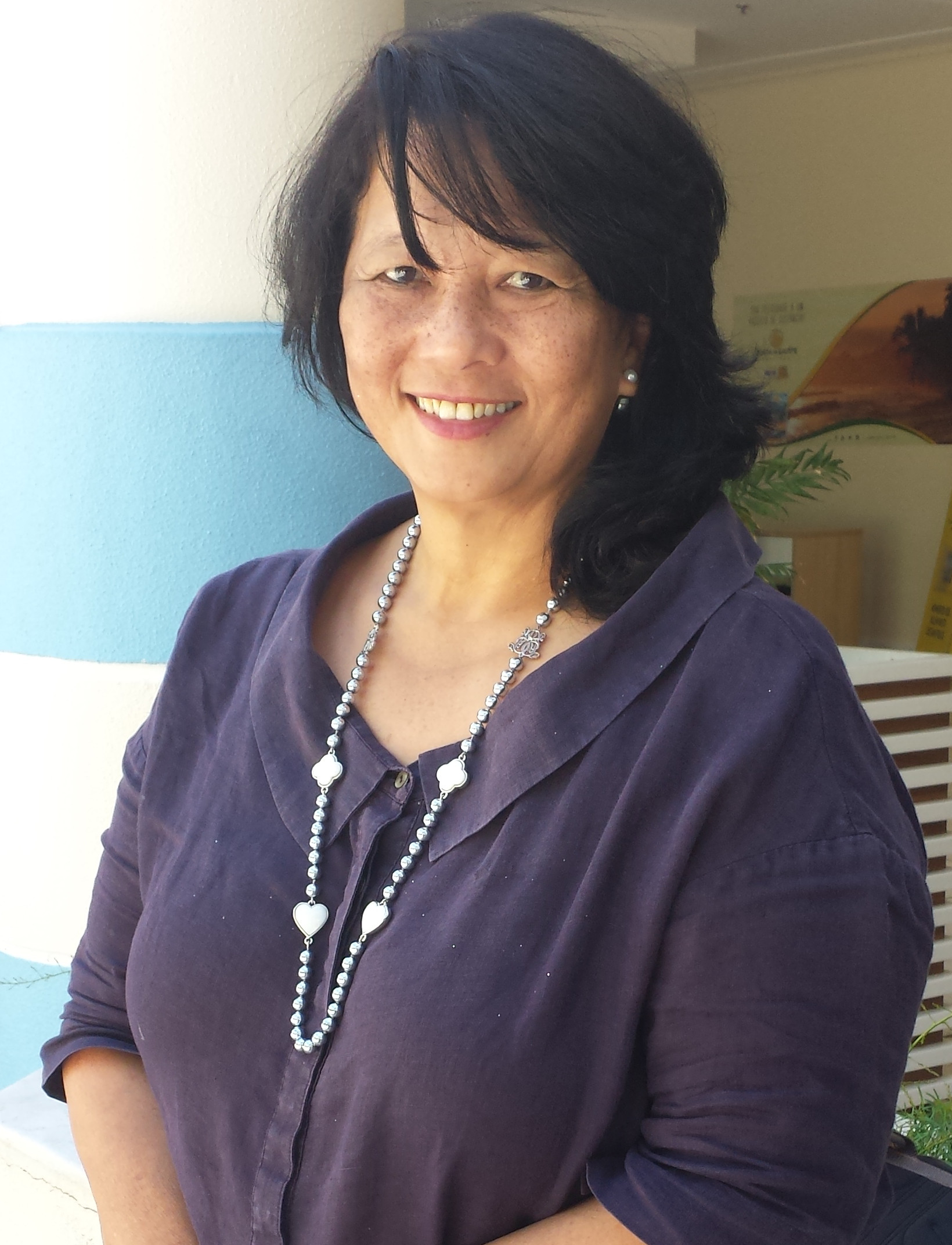
- Zainah Anwar at the AWID Forum 2016
- Born: 1954 (age 71–72); Johor, Malaysia

Head of Sisters in Islam
- Incumbent
- Assumed office 1988
- Preceded by: Organization formed

Zainah Anwar is a prominent Malaysian non-governmental organisation leader, activist and Muslim feminist. She was the head of the civil society organisation Sisters in Islam for more than two decades before stepping down. In 2013 she was named by the International Museum of Women as one of its 10 most influential Muslim women.

== Background ==
Zainah Anwar was born in Johor, to her father, Anwar bin Abdul Malik and mother, Saodah bte Abdullah, a housewife. Her father was credited as the man who gave the United Malays National Organisation or UMNO its name – initially United Malays Organisation. This was at a meeting in Batu Pahat when seven Umno founders from Johor Bahru met Datuk Onn Jaafar to call for a unification of all the disparate Malay nationalist groups at the time. He later became Onn's private secretary when Onn became Johor's Menteri Besar.

=== Family ===
In 1997, her father died at age 99, followed by her mother a year later.

Zainah was educated in Sultan Ibrahim Girls' School in Johor Bahru. Her favourite subjects were English and English literature. She told The Star in an interview that she was not a born leader, she was a born rebel.

One day, she discovered on a chance visit to the school staff room that, against her name, a frowning teacher had scribbled: "Too high spirited, too playful, too talkative, too naughty." With these four strikes against her, she never made prefect.

She told The Star newspaper in 2008:

I was always asking questions that they could not answer. Like why (Stamford) Raffles was considered the founder of Singapore when there were people (already living) there before." The traits that today serve her so well were already there. I was not scared at all. I was a non-conformist, a disobedient child. I knew I wanted to be a journalist since Form One. I was single-minded about that. I wanted to quit school and work in a newsroom right after Form Five.

Instead, she was persuaded to join the pioneer batch of aspiring journalists at the then Mara Institute of Technology in Shah Alam in 1972 (now Universiti Teknologi Mara, UiTM).

After making a name for herself as a hard-nosed journalist at the New Straits Times, she went on to do her Master's at Boston University in the United States in 1978 and read International Law and Diplomacy at the Fletcher School of Law and Diplomacy, Tufts University (also in the US), until 1986.

Upon her return, she joined the Institute of Strategic and International Studies think-tank from 1986 to 1991, before becoming chief programme officer with the Political Affairs division of the Commonwealth Secretariat in London, where she launched her global networking and enhanced her political maturity. She rejoined from 1994 to 1996, left, and freelanced for two years.

== Sisters in Islam ==
Anwar was involved with Sisters in Islam for two decades as its leader. She was responsible for building the NGO from a small organisation to a global one and is invited to give talks all over the world.

In 1987, a clutch of women lawyers and a journalist friend including Anwar jointly founded a fledgling movement to look into the problems Muslim women had with the courts. In 1990, the movement formally became known as Sisters in Islam. Its focus was to challenge laws and policy made in the name of Islam that discriminate against women. Eventually, Sisters in Islam's areas of work expanded to encompass larger issues of democracy, human rights and constitutionalism.

Said Anwar in an interview with The Star:

It's as if in Islam, women don't have any rights at all. One woman asked, if the house were on fire, would she then have to seek her husband's permission to flee! Women cannot even use their common sense to save their (own) lives. This cannot be Islam. God is just. Islam is just.

Aghast at what was being taught in the ceramahs, the founding sisters turned to the Quran to find out for themselves what the verses say, as opposed to various interpretations. What they discovered was a revelation. On polygamy, the Quran says: "If you cannot treat them the same, then marry just the one."

That was a moment of epiphany. It was that kind of questioning that made us want to read the Quran with a new lens. It was a liberating process understanding that the Quran speaks to women and is lifting and empowering.

=== Contributions ===
Zainah Anwar is most proud that Sisters in Islam has opened public space for debate and given a public voice to women to air their concerns about their rights under Syariah law. Through its forums and education programmes, Sisters in Islam has shown that the concerns of Muslim women are "not the monopoly of religious scholars. Everyone has the right to speak".

Sisters in Islam has been at the forefront of non-governmental organization's influencing amendments to Islamic Family Law. It has espoused equality and justice for women, discussed dress and modesty, the right to guardianship, women as judges, fundamental liberties in Islam, and apostasy and freedom of religion.

The organisation has exposed the diversity of interpretations of Islam, and through its research and discussions with local and international authorities, sifted through these to determine "which opinions we want to follow and codify".

=== Criticisms ===
Through the years, Anwar drew barbs because she is atypical of the image of the "good Malay-Muslim lady". Being single did not help.

She stood her ground when the voices of Muslim officialdom, from the Islamic Development Department (Jakim) to state religious bodies to the Malaysian Islamic Party, berated her organisation's lack of formal Islamic credentials. On the plus side, some of the more liberal mufti (chief clergy in respective states) have addressed Sisters in Islam seminars.

At one point, Sisters in Islam was taken more seriously abroad than at home in Malaysia. Purdah-clad women from Iran who listened incredulously to Malaysian Muslim officialdom defend polygamy, found common ground with Sisters in Islam on this issue.

=== Current involvement ===
Though Anwar has stepped down as head of Sisters in Islam, she remains on the board of directors. She concurrently serves as project director for the global movement for justice and equality in the Muslim family that was started by Sisters in Islam.

She was criticised by state religious government bodies such the Majlis Agama Islam Johore for Sisters in Islam's view about Islamic punishment in the Kartika case, whereby a Muslim woman was sentenced to be caned for the consumption of alcohol. Anwar was also questioned by the legal prosecution division of the Criminal Investigations Department on Sisters in Islam's stand on the issue.

== Social contributions ==
Anwar was appointed a commissioner with the Human Rights Commission of Malaysia or Suhakam. However, she left because she felt that as a movement, it was not making a difference.

She has addressed prestigious overseas forums such as the World Economic Forum in Davos, Switzerland, and the Lee Kuan Yew School of Public Policy annual lecture series in Singapore. She has delivered the keynote address on Islam, Human Rights, and Activism at Harvard University on 8 April 2008. She has also given an address discussing "What Islam, Whose Islam? From Misogyny to Equality" at The College of William & Mary.

== Honours ==
- Chevalier of the Legion of Honour (2014)
