= Coulouris =

Coulouris is a surname. Notable people with the surname include:

- Andrew Coulouris (born 1978), American politician
- George Coulouris (1903–1989), English actor
- George Coulouris (1937–2024), English academic, son of George
- Mary Louise Coulouris (1939–2011), American-British artist
