= Xam =

Xam may refer to:

- XAM, a data storage standard
- Xẩm, a type of Vietnamese folk music
- ǀXam language, an extinct language of South Africa
- Xam Wilson Cartiér (born 1949), writer from Missouri, United States
