= Honeycomb (disambiguation) =

A honeycomb is a mass of hexagonal wax cells built by honeybees in their beehives.

Honeycomb may also refer to:

== Food ==
- Honeycomb (cereal)
- Honeycomb toffee

== Music ==
- The Honeycombs, an English 1960s pop group
- Honeycomb (album), by Frank Black
- "Honeycomb" (song), written by Bob Merrill and popularized by Jimmie Rodgers
- "Honeycomb" / "Gotham", a single by Animal Collective
- "Honeycomb", a song by Deafheaven from Ordinary Corrupt Human Love
- "Honeycomb", a song by Panchiko from Ginkgo

== Science ==
- Honeycombing, a lung disorder
- Reticulum (anatomy) or honeycomb, part of the alimentary canal of a ruminant animal
- The honeycomb conjecture, in geometry
- Honeycomb (geometry), a space-filling tessellation
- Honeycomb lattice, a two-dimensional hexagonal lattice
- Honeycomb mirror, used in astronomical telescopes

== Other uses ==
- Honeycomb (1969 film), a Spanish drama film
- Honeycomb (2022 film), a Canadian horror film
- Android Honeycomb, the codename for versions 3.0–3.2 of the Android operating system
- Honeycomb (company), an American software company
- Honeycomb ground, a type of bobbin lace mesh
- Honeycomb housing, an urban planning model pertaining to residential subdivision design
- Honeycomb structure, natural or man-made structures that have the geometry of a honeycomb
- The Honeycombs (Oregon), rock formations in Malheur County
- Project Honeycomb, a Sun Microsystems object-oriented storage system
