= ISM (company) =

Canadian technology service company

- ISM Logo, 2025
- Type: Subsidiary
- Industry: Information technology; data consulting; cybersecurity
- Founded: 1973; 53 years ago
- Headquarters: Regina, Saskatchewan, Canada
- Key people: Debasis Bhaumik (President and CEO)
- Number of employees: 450 (2024)
- Parent: Kyndryl
- Website: ismcanada.com

ISM is an information technology service company based in Regina, Saskatchewan. The main company office is currently located at 1801 Hamilton St, Regina, as of 2026. Since 2021, the company has been a wholly owned subsidiary of Kyndryl Canada Limited.

ISM is headquartered in Regina, Saskatchewan and employees teams and remote employees in many Canadian cities, providing services to customers all across Canada in both public and private sectors.

== History ==
=== 1973 ===
The Saskatchewan Computer Utility Corporation (SaskCOMP) was established in April 1973 under General Manager L.T.Holmes SaskCOMP was formed through the acquisition of the Systems Centre Branch of the Department of Government Services and Saskatchewan Power Corporation Computer Services. The corporations initial objective was to consolidate and combine computer services for provincially-funded institutions

=== 1974 ===
Further expansion of SaskCOMP - with the acquisition of the University of Saskatchewan, Saskatoon Campus Computation Centre and the University of Saskatchewan, Regina Campus Computer Centre. SaskCOMP's major new customers were the City of Prince Albert and the Saskatchewan Government Insurance office

=== 1975–1980 ===
The central theme for SaskCOMP was improved ease of access to computers. Revenue grew by 16% overall and software associated with new services increased four-fold and was expected to double again in 1976. In 1976, Norm E.Glassel took over as General Manager of SaskCOMP and a comprehensive mandate was formed for the corporation. The computers at the three main centres in PA, Saskatoon and Regina were linked via telecommunications lines to enable SaskCOMP customers at any one centre to use the services of another. SaskCOMP created a Minicomputer Division to provide minicomputer services to customers as readily as large-scale computers

In 1977, SaskCOMP installed the IBM System/370 Model 168 computer to replace a model 158 computer. The Model 158 computer was sold for $640,000. In 1978 SaskCOMP had grown to become the twelfth largest service bureau in Canada! In 1979, SaskCOMP was part of a newly formed committee with the Department of Education and the Saskatchewan Teacher's Federation to promote the effective use of - and guidelines for the installation of - microcomputers in primary and secondary schools. In 1980, SaskCOMP moved into the new Galleria building at Innovation Place Research Park in Saskatoon.

=== 1981–1990 ===
SaskCOMP was leasing IBM's largest system and became the 8th largest computer operation in Canada. SaskCOMP rates were the lowest in the Canadian service bureau industry. Efforts continued to focus on data security with new security policies, dedicated security employees and secure storage. SaskCOMP increased the CPU capacity by 40% at Regina Regional Centre by upgrading equipment through a contract with IBM. Affirmative action was introduced to attract more target group employees to SaskCOMP.

In 1986, SaskCOMP deployed the first Disaster Recovery Service in Western Canada. Gerald Thom was named the President of SaskCOMP. Remote control centres were established to provide access over high-speed lines. A new corporate registry was established for use by the legal profession to search for information on registered and non-profit companies. SaskCOMP upgraded technology with a new IBM 3090-200E processor installation.

In 1988, SaskCOMP became Westbridge Group. Four provincially owned companies merged, and were privatized. A new direction in data storage was implemented with "tomorrow's technology in mind." In 1989, Westbridge shifted to integrated technology services. Len McCurdy was named president. Westbridge was listed as a penny stock on the Toronto Stock Exchange and every employee got 100 shares. At this time, the corporation nearly became insolvent due to investment in Mr. McCurdy's previous computer leasing company, just as computer leasing was becoming unprofitable.

=== 1991–2000 ===
ISM was formed through the merger of Westbridge Computer Corp and STM Systems Corp. The official opening of the new head office at 1 Research Drive, Regina. IBM assumed a controlling financial interest in ISM. IBM outsourced its internal computer operations (host and client-server systems) to ISM. ISM ranked as one of the top 500 Canadian companies, moving up almost 300 places in the survey by Commerce magazine.

In 1995, ISM Information Systems Management Corporation becomes 100% owned by IBM. ISM sponsored the Grey Cup 1995 in Regina: "Huddle Up in Saskatchewan." In 1997, major organizational changes occurred with the creation of IBM Global Services.

IBM Canada formed Regina-based ISM in 2005. The ISM name is not an acronym, and is simply three letters, known either as ISM or ISM - a Kyndryl company.

=== 2021 ===
ISM became a wholly owned subsidiary of Kyndryl Canada Limited on September 1, 2021.
