= Elastic cloud storage =

An elastic cloud is a cloud computing offering that provides variable service levels based on changing needs.

Elasticity is an attribute that can be applied to most cloud services. It states that the capacity and performance of any given cloud service can expand or contract according to a customer's requirements and that this can potentially be changed automatically as a consequence of some software-driven event or, at worst, can be reconfigured quickly by the customer's infrastructure management team.

Elasticity has been described as one of the five main principles of cloud computing by Rosenburg and Mateos in The Cloud at Your Service - Manning 2011.

== History ==
Cloud computing was first described by Gillet and Kapor in 1996; however, the first practical implementation was a consequence of a strategy to leverage Amazon's excess data center capacity.

Amazon and other pioneers of the commercial use of this technology were primarily interested in providing a “public” cloud service, whereby they could offer customers the benefits of using the cloud, particularly the utility-based pricing model benefit.

Other suppliers followed suit with a range of cloud-based models all offering elasticity as a core component, but these suppliers were only offering this service as an element of their public cloud service.

Due to perceived weaknesses in security, or at least a lack of proven compliance, many organizations, particularly in the financial and public sectors, have been slow adopters of cloud technologies. These wary organizations can achieve some of the benefits of cloud computing by adopting private cloud technologies.

An alternative form of the elastic cloud has been offered by vendors such as EMC and IBM, whereby the service is based around an enterprise's own infrastructure but still retains elements of elasticity and the potential to bill by consumption.

== Description ==
Elasticity in cloud computing is the ability for the organization to adjust its storage requirements in terms of capacity and processing with respect to operational requirements. This has the following benefits:

Operational Benefits - Services can be acquired quickly, meaning that the evolving requirements of the business can be addressed almost immediately, giving an organization a potential agility advantage. A properly implemented elastic system will provision/de-provision according to application demands, so if a particular business has activity spikes then the provision can be enabled to match the demand and the capacity can be re-allocated.

Research and Development (R&D) Projects - R&D activities are no longer hindered by a requirement to secure a capex budget prior to a project starting. Capability can simply be provisioned from the cloud and released at the end of the exercise.

Testing and Deployment - With most large-scale projects a size test needs to be performed prior to final rollout. By taking advantage of the elasticity of the cloud and creating a full-scale avatar of the proposed production system, realistic data and traffic volumes can be provisioned and released as needed.

Expensive Resources Allocated - This will normally apply only in the context where a customer is applying at least some of their own servers as part of a cloud infrastructure, specifically where a business (for performance reasons) has decided to invest in solid-state storage as opposed to spinning platters. There are instances when, due to activity spikes, a less critical process may need to be moved from the high-performance resources to more traditional storage.

Server Specification - When a customer has elected to own/lease hardware, they can select and specify servers that are specifically tuned to meet the likely needs of their operation (i.e., directly controlling the cost/benefit equation).

Utility Based Payments - There is, of course, a key cost driver in this process, and the notion that you should pay for what you consume is acceptable for many organizations. When hardware capacity is sourced internally, organizations need to over-provision. This applies just as much to traditional outsourcing as it does to capex-related expenditure on in-house servers.

Cloud Platform - For any cloud storage system, a key feature is the ability to manage hyperscale object storage and a Hadoop Distributed Files System (HDFS). Elastic storage capability is particularly well suited to hyperscale and Hadoop environments, where its capability to rapidly respond to changing circumstances and priorities is essential

== See also ==
- EMC.com
- Software-defined storage
- Object storage
- Amazon Web Services
- DigitalOcean
- HP Converged Cloud
- IBM Cloud Computing
- Microsoft Azure
- OpenStack
- Rackspace
- Skytap
- VMware
