= Git-annex =

Distributed file synchronization system

git-annex
- Original author: Joey Hess
- Initial release: 19 October 2010; 15 years ago
- Stable release: 10.20251114 / 14 November 2025; 44 days ago
- Repository: git-annex.branchable.com
- Written in: Haskell
- Operating system: Linux, FreeBSD, Android, OS X, Windows
- Size: 44.2 MB
- Type: File synchronization
- License: GPL3+, AGPL3+
- Website: git-annex.branchable.com

git-annex is a distributed file synchronization system written in Haskell. It aims to share and synchronize collections of large files independent from a commercial service and a central server.

== History ==
The development of git-annex began in 2010. In 2012-13 the development was funded through a Kickstarter campaign. The main development of this campaign was the git-annex assistant, a component that runs in the background to automate the synchronization of repositories.

A following crowd funding campaign for 2013-14 was organized over a self-hosted platform.

== Design ==
git-annex uses Git to index files but does not store them in the Git history. Instead, a symbolic link representing and linking to the possibly large file is committed. git-annex manages a content-addressable storage for the files under its control. A separate Git branch logs the location of every file. Thus users can clone a git-annex repository and then decide for every file whether to make it locally available.

== Availability ==
git-annex packages are available for a variety of operating systems, including:

- Debian
- Ubuntu
- Fedora
- FreeBSD
- Arch Linux
- NixOS
- Guix
- Gentoo
- OpenBSD
- Android
- macOS (via Homebrew)
- Windows
