= Kyndryl =

U.S. information technology company

Kyndryl Holdings, Inc.
- Type: Public
- Traded as: NYSE: KD; S&P 400 component
- ISIN: US50155Q1004
- Industry: Information technology; Consulting; Outsourcing
- Founded: November 3, 2021; 4 years ago
- Headquarters: New York City, U.S.
- Key people: Martin Schroeter (CEO)
- Services: Managed services
- Revenue: ▼US$15.1 billion (2025)
- Net income: ▲US$252 million (2025)
- Total assets: ▼US$10.4 billion (2025)
- Total equity: ▲US$1.33 billion (2025)
- Number of employees: c. 73,000 (2025)
- Website: kyndryl.com
- Footnotes; Financials as of March 31, 2025.

Kyndryl Holdings, Inc. is an American multinational corporation headquartered in New York City. The company designs, builds, and manages infrastructure services. The company also has business advisory services.

== History ==
Officially formed in late 2021, Kyndryl was created from the spin-off of IBM's infrastructure services, and comprises the bulk of the former IBM Global Technology Services. At year-end 2020, the spin-off had a portfolio of around 4,400 customers, including 75% of the Fortune 100. The company was given the name Kyndryl in April 2021, with "Kyn" referencing "kinship" and "Dryl" referencing "tendril". On November 4, 2021, Kyndryl completed its separation from IBM and began trading as an independent company on the New York Stock Exchange, with Martin Schroeter as chairman and CEO. Kyndryl operated in 63 countries in November 2021, and managed around 400 data centers.

By November 2021, Kyndryl had also partnered with Microsoft to provide digital transformation services using Microsoft Cloud products. In December 2021, Kyndryl partnered with Google Cloud on digital transformation projects as well. Kyndryl announced new reporting segments for its finances in January 2022. Kyndryl partnered with Amazon Web Services in February 2022, and in October 2022, Kyndryl and Microsoft created a data pipeline between Microsoft Azure and Kyndryl's zCloud platform. In 2022, as ranked by revenue, CRN placed Kyndryl No. 6 on its list of largest IT solution providers in North America. On September 28, 2023, the Financial Times quoted sources saying that Kyndryl was separating its Chinese arm, saying the decision was influenced by increased tensions between the United States and China. On 13 May 2024, Kyndryl announced the acquisition of Skytap and the divesture of Securities Industry Services to Broadridge Financial Solutions, as part of a portfolio optimization action.

== Global operations ==
As of March 2026, Kyndryl had approximately 72,000 employees in 60 countries. Its main hubs were in India, Japan, Poland, Brazil, Czechia and Hungary.

The company's international service delivery centres include sites in Wrocław, Katowice and Brno. In Hungary, Kyndryl has offices in Székesfehérvár and Budapest. The company also operates an infrastructure command centre in Osaka.

Kyndryl has security operations centres in Hortolândia and Rome. In February 2026, it opened its first integrated Cyber Defense Operations Center in Bengaluru.

== Services ==
Focused on IT services for businesses, Kyndryl designs, builds, manages, and modernizes enterprise IT infrastructure systems, with capabilities in artificial intelligence as well as data and analytics. In late 2021, Kyndryl listed its six service areas as: cloud; security and resiliency; network and edge computing; digital workplace; core enterprise and zCloud; and applications, data, and AI. Kyndryl launched Kyndryl Bridge and a business consulting segment in 2022.
