= Microsoft SMA =

Microsoft Azure component

Microsoft Service Management Automation or Microsoft SMA is a software component of Microsoft Azure that allows users to manage SQL databases on servers through an instanced Linux application. It is one of the software applications developed by Microsoft to address the emerging technologies within cloud computing. The project falls under the umbrella project of the Microsoft System Center Configuration Manager suite of software applications. Updates are released on a semiannual basis. The software utilizes Azure Availability Zones for updates.
