= Martin Schroeter =

American business executive (born 1964)

- Born: 1964 (age 61–62)
- Citizenship: United States, Australia
- Education: Temple University (BA); Carnegie Mellon University (MBA)
- Occupation: Business executive
- Years active: 1992-2020 (IBM); 2021-present (Kyndryl)
- Employer(s): Kyndryl (CEO and Chairman)
- Board member of: Kyndryl

Martin Schroeter (born 1964) is an American-Australian businessperson. He has been the founding chairman and CEO of Kyndryl, since 2021. He previously held roles at IBM, including CFO from 2014 to 2017, and senior vice president of global markets until 2020. Schroeter is a member of the Council on Foreign Relations, the Business Roundtable, The Business Council, and the U.S.-India CEO Forum.

== Early life ==
Schroeter was born in 1964. He received his undergraduate degree in economics and finance from Temple University in Philadelphia, and his Master of Business Administration degree from Carnegie Mellon University in Pittsburgh.

== Career ==
=== IBM ===
Early in his career, Schroeter worked as a corporate banking officer before joining IBM in 1992. While at IBM he held various roles in Japan, the United States, and Australia and was IBM treasurer from 2007 to 2011. Schroeter became general manager of IBM’s global financing in 2011. On January 1, 2014, he succeeded Mark Loughridge as chief financial officer of IBM. He was CFO of IBM from 2014 to 2017. As IBM CFO, he spoke at the 2014 RBC Capital Markets' Technology, Internet, Media and Telecommunications Conference, and in 2016, he oversaw a decision to overhaul IBM's financial reporting to focus on areas such as cloud computing and data analytics. Schroeter talked about IBM's financials on Jim Cramer's Mad Money in October 2017.

On January 11, 2018, Schroeter was named senior vice president of global markets of IBM, reporting to CEO Ginni Rometty. Schroeter retired from IBM in June 2020.

=== Kyndryl chairman and CEO ===
On January 15, 2021, Schroeter became the head of a new IBM spinoff focused on IT infrastructure services. Schroeter was given immediate oversight of "4,600 existing clients in 115 countries, $60bn in service backlog and, according to IBM, some 90,000 staff."

In November 2021, Schroeter became Kyndryl's chairman and CEO. On November 4, 2021 the spinoff was completed, with Kyndryl Holdings Inc. trading on the NYSE. In August 2022, Schroeter stated Kyndryl was expanding in "non-IBM technology, including cloud, AI and security." Initially, Schroeter stated many of the legacy contracts Kyndryl inherited from IBM were not profitable, with Kyndryl's profits dropping in 2022 before rising in 2023 as the company expanded its service areas. In February 2026 Schroeter came under fire due to an SEC investigation into Kyndryl's accounting practices which caused the immediate departure of its CFO and General Counsel. The investigation is ongoing and has not yet determined to what degree Schroeter was involved. Schroeter remains chairman and CEO of Kyndryl.

== Boards and councils ==
Schroeter is a member of the Council of Foreign Relations, Business Roundtable, as well as The Business Council and the U.S.-India CEO Forum. He is also chairman of Kyndryl. In October 2023, he and his wife Susan were invited to US President Joe Biden's state dinner honoring Australian Prime Minister Anthony Albanese.
