= Casync =

Linux software utility

casync
- Original author: Lennart Poettering
- Initial release: June 20, 2017; 8 years ago
- Stable release: 2 / 26 July 2017; 8 years ago
- Written in: C
- Operating system: Linux
- Type: Data transfer
- License: LGPLv2.1
- Website: github.com/systemd/casync/
- Repository: github.com/systemd/casync/

casync (content-addressable synchronisation) is a Linux software utility designed to distribute frequently-updated file system images over the Internet.

== Utility ==
According to the creator Lennart Poettering, casync is inspired by rsync and Git, as well as tar. casync is aimed to be used for Internet of things (IoT), containerization, virtual machines (VMs), portable services, and operating system (OS) images, as well as backups and home directory synchronization. casync splits images into variable size segments, uses sha256 checksums, and aims to work with content delivery networks (CDNs). Available for Linux only, packages are available for Ubuntu, Fedora and Arch Linux.

== Similar software ==
Similar software that delivers file system images are:

- Docker with a layered tarballs
- OSTree

== See also ==
- BitTorrent
- Data deduplication
- Flatpak
- InterPlanetary File System
- SquashFS
- zsync
