= George Coulouris =

English actor (1903–1989)

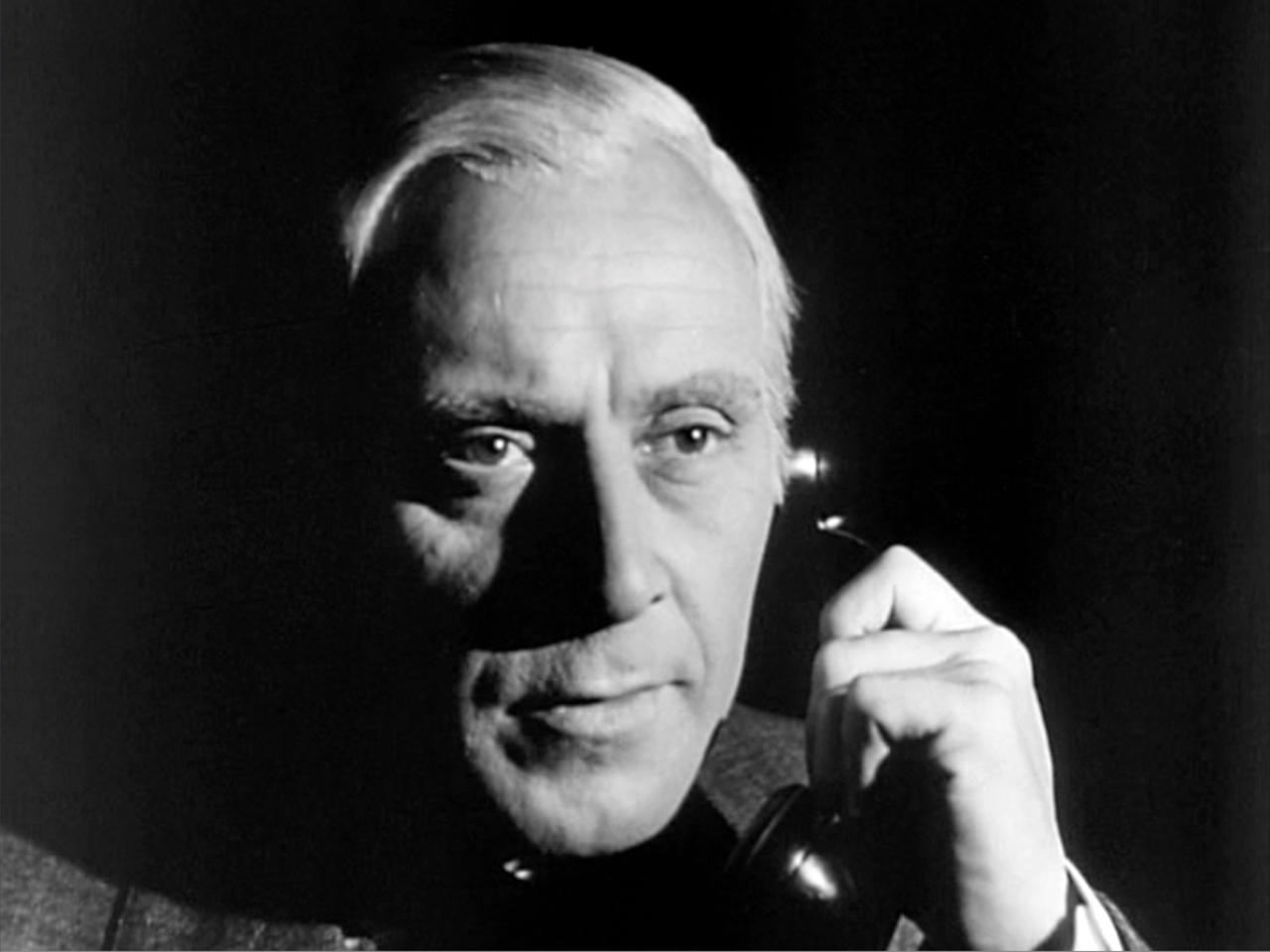
- Coulouris as Thatcher in Citizen Kane (1941)
- Born: George Alexander Coulouris; 1 October 1903; Manchester, Lancashire, England
- Died: 25 April 1989 (aged 85); London, England
- Education: Royal Central School of Speech and Drama
- Occupation: Actor
- Years active: 1926–1985
- Spouses: Louise Franklin (m. 1930; died 1976) Elizabeth Donaldson (m. 1977)
- Children: George Coulouris; Mary Louise Coulouris

George Alexander Coulouris (1 October 1903 – 25 April 1989) was an English stage and screen actor, perhaps best known for his collaborations with Orson Welles.

== Early life and education ==
Coulouris was born in Manchester in 1903, the son of a Greek immigrant father and an English mother. He was brought up both there and in nearby Urmston, and was educated at Manchester Grammar School. He studied acting at the Royal Central School of Speech and Drama, where he was classmates with Laurence Olivier and Peggy Ashcroft.

== Career ==
=== Early roles ===
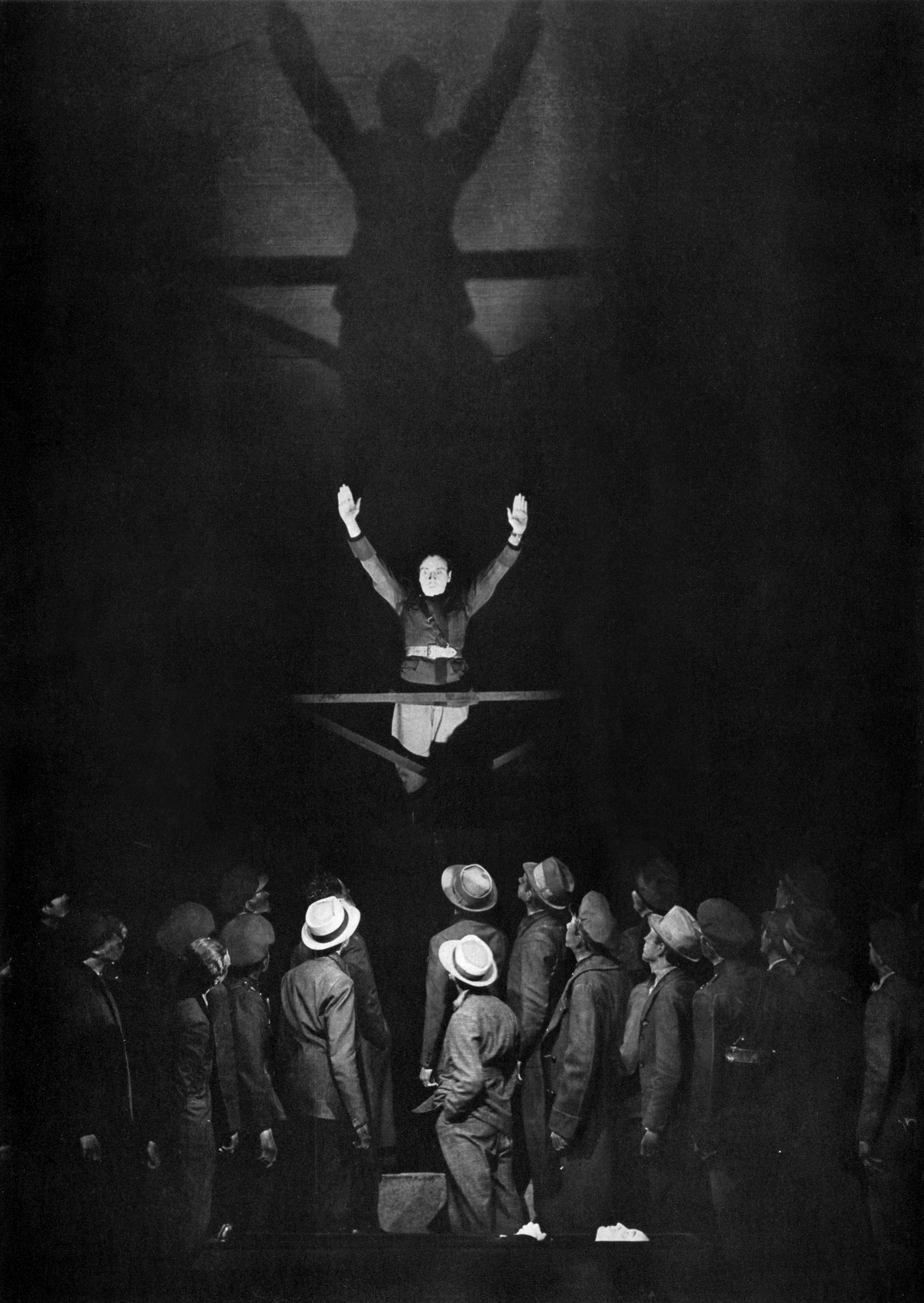
Marc Antony (George Coulouris) addresses the crowd in the Mercury Theatre production of Caesar (1937), a modern-dress production that evoked comparison to contemporary Fascist Italy and Nazi Germany

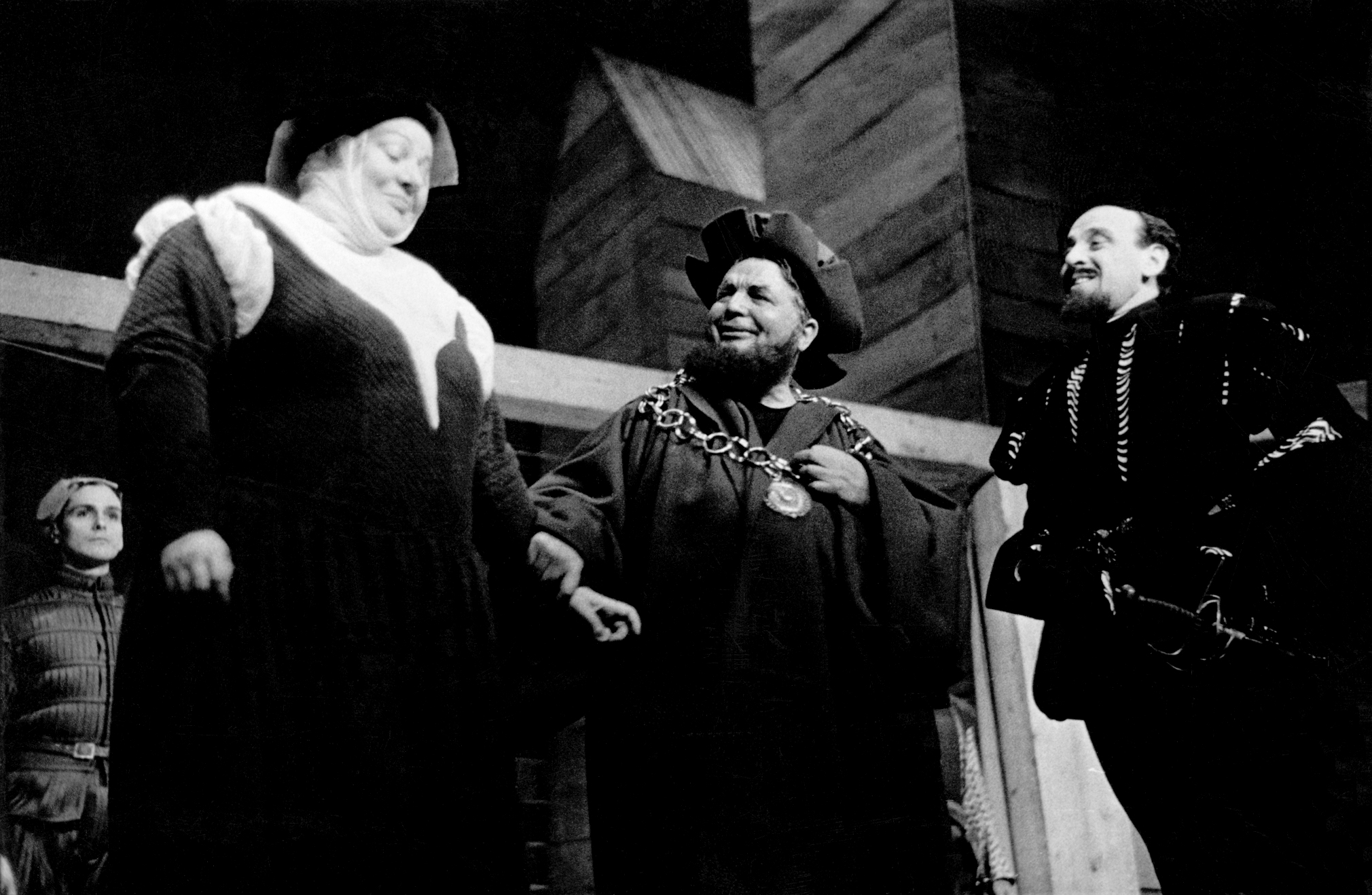
Marian Warring-Manley as Margery, Whitford Kane as Simon Eyre and George Coulouris as the King in the Mercury Theatre production of The Shoemaker's Holiday (1938)

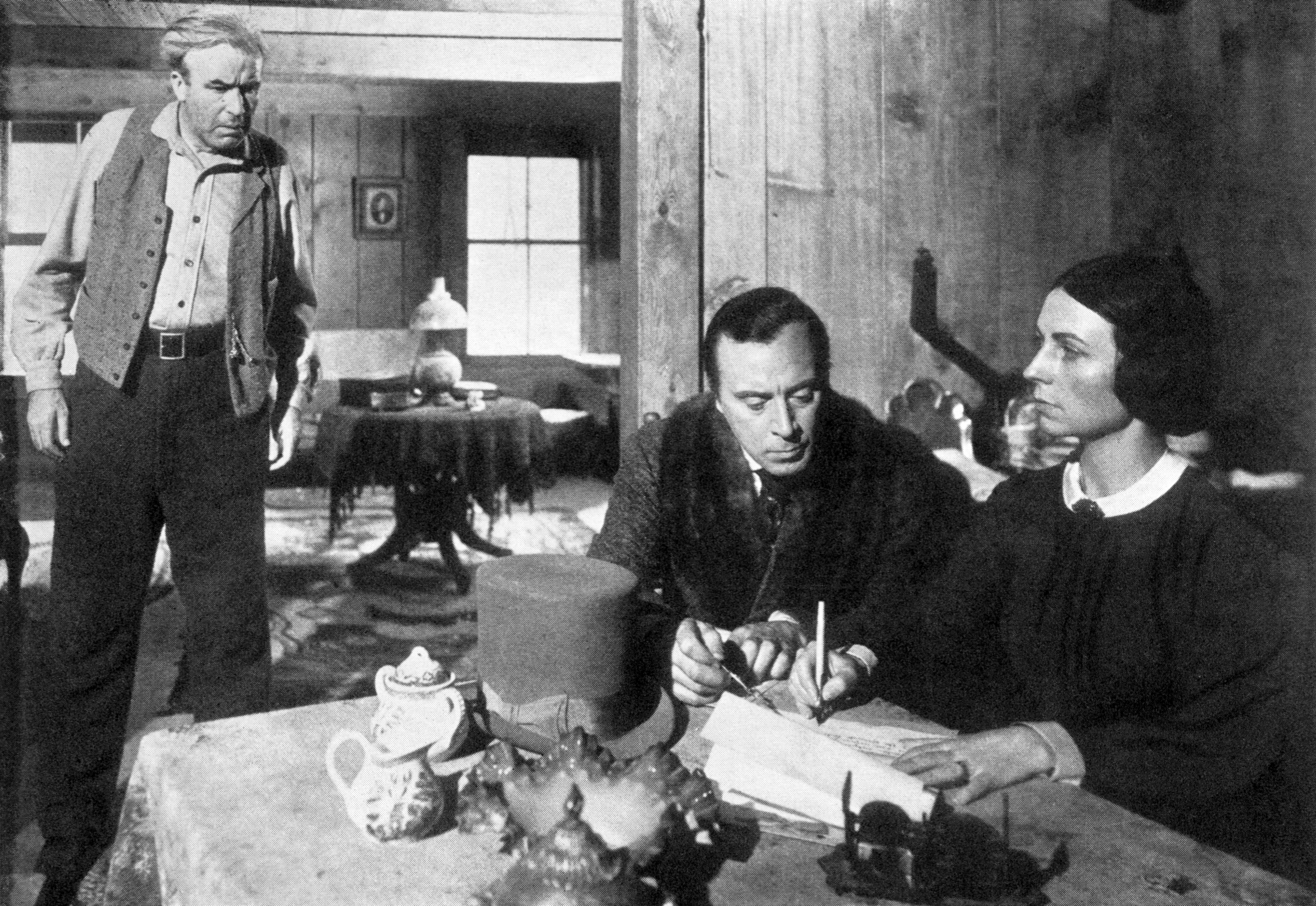
Harry Shannon, George Coulouris and Agnes Moorehead in Citizen Kane (1941)

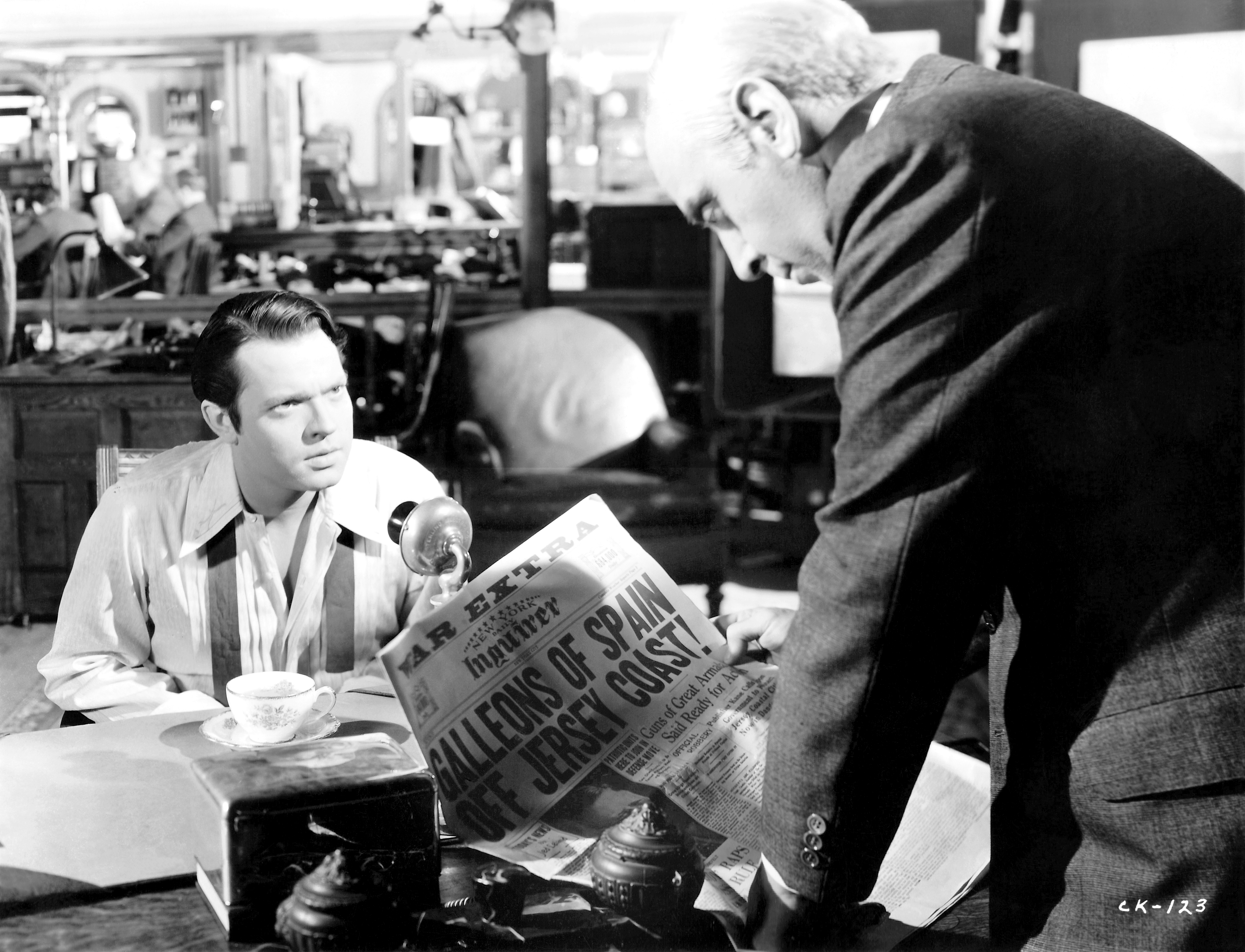
The National Board of Review recognised both Orson Welles and George Coulouris for their performances in Citizen Kane (1941)

Coulouris made his stage debut in 1926 with Henry V at the Old Vic. In 1928 and 1929 he appeared in several productions at the Cambridge Festival Theatre including Eugene O'Neill's The Hairy Ape.. By 1929, he made his first Broadway appearance, followed by his first Hollywood film role in 1933.

=== Work with Orson Welles ===
A major impact on his life was Orson Welles, whom he met in 1936 when they both had roles in the Broadway production of Sidney Kingsley's Ten Million Ghosts. Welles invited Coulouris to become a charter member of his Mercury Theatre, and in 1937 Coulouris performed the role of Mark Antony in the company's debut production, Caesar, an innovative modern-dress production of Shakespeare's Julius Caesar.

In 1938, he appeared in the Mercury stage productions of The Shoemaker's Holiday and Heartbreak House, and became part of the repertory company that presented CBS Radio's The Mercury Theatre on the Air and its sponsored continuation, The Campbell Playhouse (1938–40). Also for CBS, in 1943 he appeared in the radio series Suspense, in the episode "The Last Letter of Dr. Bronson" with Laird Cregar and in 1944, "Portrait without a Face".

In Citizen Kane (1941), Coulouris played Walter Parks Thatcher, a financier similar to J. P. Morgan. Coulouris and Welles each received a 1941 National Board of Review Award for their performances.

During the 1940s, Coulouris remained a regular figure on the stage and screen, starring in his own Broadway production of Richard III in 1943. His films in this period included For Whom the Bell Tolls (1943), Between Two Worlds (1944), Mr. Skeffington (1944) and Watch on the Rhine (1943), in which he repeated the role he originated in the Broadway production. He also performed as Robert de Baudricourt in Joan of Arc (1948), starring Ingrid Bergman.

Coulouris was the first actor to star in the title role of the Bulldog Drummond radio program on the Mutual Broadcasting System.

=== Return to Britain ===
After his return in 1950 Coulouris joined the Bristol Old Vic company for its Spring season, appearing as Tartuffe, Brutus and Sir John Brute, among other roles. Living in Putney and later in Hampstead. he appeared in more films, theatre and television productions. His stage work was the most well regarded and included the title role in King Lear at the Glasgow Citizens' Theatre (1952); the lead (Dr. Stockmann) in An Enemy of the People (1959) at the Arts Theatre, Cambridge; Peter Flynn in Seán O'Casey's The Plough and the Stars at the Mermaid Theatre (1962); a part in August Strindberg's The Dance of Death; and Big Daddy in Tennessee Williams's Cat on a Hot Tin Roof (1970).

Later film roles included parts in The Heart of the Matter (1953), Doctor in the House (1954), Papillon (1973), Mahler and Murder on the Orient Express (both 1974). He had rare leading roles in the British horror movies The Man Without a Body (1957) and The Woman Eater (1958).

He played in over 80 films, but radio roles were also numerous, and his television roles included parts in Hancock's Half Hour ("The Missing Page"), Danger Man and The Prisoner ("Checkmate", 1967). Other appearances included the recurring role of science writer Harcourt Brown in the ABC serials Pathfinders to Mars and Pathfinders to Venus, which were sequels to earlier serials (Target Luna and Pathfinders in Space). He appeared as Arbitan in the Doctor Who serial The Keys of Marinus (1964).

HIs last film role was in the crime drama The Long Good Friday (1980).

== Personal life ==
Coulouris was married to Louise Franklin from 1930 until her death in 1976, and then to Elizabeth Donaldson from 1977 until his death. He was the father of computer scientist George Coulouris and artist Mary Louise Coulouris. His home in Hampstead between 1951 and 1989 is shown in the Camden Notables Map.

=== Death ===
In his later years, Coulouris suffered from Parkinson's disease. He died of heart failure in London on 25 April 1989, aged 85.

== Media portrayals ==
In Me and Orson Welles (2008), Richard Linklater's period drama set in the days surrounding the premiere of the Mercury Theatre's production of Caesar, Coulouris is portrayed by Ben Chaplin.

== Filmography ==
- Christopher Bean (1933) as Tallent
- All This, and Heaven Too (1940) as Charpentier
- The Lady in Question (1940) as Defense Attorney
- Citizen Kane (1941) as Walter Parks Thatcher
- Assignment in Brittany (1943) as Captain Hans Holz
- This Land Is Mine (1943) as Prosecutor
- For Whom the Bell Tolls (1943) as André Massart (uncredited)
- Watch on the Rhine (1943) as Teck de Brancovis
- Between Two Worlds (1944) as Mr. Lingley
- Mr. Skeffington (1944) as Doctor Byles
- The Master Race (1944) as Von Beck
- None But the Lonely Heart (1944) as Jim Mordinoy
- A Song to Remember (1945) as Louis Pleyel
- Hotel Berlin (1945) as Joachim Helm
- Lady on a Train (1945) as Mr. Saunders
- Confidential Agent (1945) as Captain Currie
- Nobody Lives Forever (1946) as Doc Ganson
- The Verdict (1946) as Supt. John R. Buckley
- California (1947) as Capt. Pharaoh Coffin
- Mr. District Attorney (1947) as James Randolph
- Where There's Life (1947) as Prime Minister Krivoc
- Sleep, My Love (1948) as Charles Vernay
- Beyond Glory (1948) as Lew Proctor
- A Southern Yankee (1948) as Maj. Jack Drumman aka The Grey Spider
- Joan of Arc (1948) as Sir Robert de Baudricourt - governor of Vaucouleurs
- Appointment with Venus (1951) as Capt. Weiss
- Outcast of the Islands (1951) as Babalatchi
- Venetian Bird (1952) as Babalatchi
- The Dog and the Diamonds (1953) as Forbes
- The Heart of the Matter (1953) as Portuguese Captain
- A Day to Remember (1953) as Foreign Legion Captain.
- The Runaway Bus (1954) as Edward Schroeder
- Doctor in the House (1954) as Briggs
- Duel in the Jungle (1954) as Capt. Malburn
- The Teckman Mystery (1954) as Garvin
- Mask of Dust (1954) as 'Pic' Dallapiccola
- Doctor at Sea (1955) as 'Chippie' the Carpenter
- Private's Progress (1956) as Padre
- The Big Money (1956) as The Colonel
- Doctor at Large (1957) as Pascoe
- Tarzan and the Lost Safari (1957) as Carl Kraski
- The Man Without a Body (1957) as Karl Brussard
- Kill Me Tomorrow (1957) as Heinz Webber
- Seven Thunders (1957) as Paul Bourdin
- I Accuse! (1958) as Colonel Sandherr
- Womaneater (1958) as Doctor Moran
- No Time to Die (1958) as Camp Commandant
- Law and Disorder (1958) as 'Bennie' Bensuson
- Spy in the Sky! (1958) as Col. Benedict
- The Son of Robin Hood (1958) as Alan A Dale
- Bluebeard's Ten Honeymoons (1960) as Lacoste
- Conspiracy of Hearts (1960) as Petrelli
- The Boy Who Stole a Million (1960) as Bank manager
- Surprise Package (1960) as Dr. Hugo Panzer
- Fury at Smugglers' Bay (1961) as François Lejeune
- King of Kings (1961) as Camel Driver
- Come Fly with Me (1963) as Vienna Police Inspector (uncredited)
- In the Cool of the Day (1963) (scenes deleted)
- The Crooked Road (1965) as Carlo
- The Skull (1965) as Dr. Londe
- Scruggs (1965)
- Arabesque (1966) as Ragheeb
- Too Many Thieves (1967) as Andrew
- Sleep Is Lovely (1968) as Police Inspector (lost film)
- The Assassination Bureau (1969) as Swiss Peasant
- Land Raiders (1970) as Cardenas
- No Blade of Grass (1970) as Mr. Sturdevant
- Blood from the Mummy's Tomb (1971) as Professor Berrigan
- A Clockwork Orange (1971) as Professor (uncredited)
- Tower of Evil (1972) as John Gurney
- The Stranger (1973) as the Bookseller
- The Final Programme (1973) as Dr. Powys
- Papillon (1973) as Dr. Chatal
- Mahler (1974) as Doctor Roth
- Percy's Progress (1974) as Prof. Godowski
- Murder on the Orient Express (1974) as Doctor Constantine
- The Antichrist (1974) as Father Mittner
- Shout at the Devil (1976) as El Keb
- The Ritz (1976) as Old Man Vespucci
- The Long Good Friday (1980) as Gus

== Broadway roles ==
George Coulouris's Broadway credits are listed at the Internet Broadway Database.

=== Actor ===
- The Novice and the Duke (9 December 1929 – January 1930) as Friar Peter
- The Late Christopher Bean (31 October 1932 – May 1933) as Tallant
- Best Sellers (3 May – June 1933) as Julian Mosca
- Mary of Scotland (27 November 1933 – July 1934) as Lord Burghley and as Lord Erskine
- Valley Forge (10 December 1934 – January 1935) as Lieutenant Cutting
- Blind Alley (24 September 1935 – January 1936) as Dr. Anthony Shelby
- Saint Joan (9 March – May 1936) as John de Stogumber
- Ten Million Ghosts (23 October – November 1936) as Zacharey
- Caesar (11 November 1937 – March 1938) as Marc Antony
- The Shoemaker's Holiday (1 January – 28 April 1938) as The King
- Heartbreak House (29 April – 11 June 1938) as Boss Mangan
- Madame Capet (October 1938) as Mirabeau
- The White Steed (10 January 1939 –?) as Father Shaughnessy
- Cue for Passion (19–28 December 1940) as John Elliott
- Watch on the Rhine (1 April 1941 – 21 February 1942) as Teck de Brancovis
- King Richard III (24 March – 3 April 1943) as Richard, Duke of Glouchester (Richard III)
- The Master Race (1944) American drama as Von Beck
- The Alchemist (6–16 May 1948) as Subtle
- S.S. Glencairn (20–30 May 1948) as The Donkey Man
- The Insect Comedy (3–12 June 1948) as The Vagrant
- Beekman Place (7–31 October 1964) as Samuel Holt
- The Condemned of Altona (3 February – 13 March 1966)

=== Director ===
- King Richard III (24 March – 3 April 1943)
