= Mary Louise Coulouris =

American-British artist

Mary Louise Coulouris (17 July 1939 – 20 December 2011) was an American-British artist.

== Early life and education ==
Mary Louise Coulouris was born in 1939 in New York City, the daughter of actor George Coulouris, and sister of computer scientist George F. Coulouris. She spent her first ten years in the United States, mainly in Beverly Hills.

She attended the Parliament Hill School, Chelsea School of Art, and the Slade School of Fine Art. She studied under William Coldstream and Anthony Gross at the Slade, and spent two years in Paris at the Ecole des Beaux Arts and Atelier 17, as a student of Stanley William Hayter. Her first solo exhibition was in Paris in 1964.

== Career ==
Coulouris established a home and studio in Strawberry Bank, Linlithgow, West Lothian in 1976. Commissions included murals at the Linlithgow railway station (1985) and the Royal Edinburgh Hospital (1990); a series of watercolors for the House of Lords (2004), and a set of watercolors inspired by poetry for the Royal Free Hospital (2008); rug design for the Scottish Poetry Library (1999) and tapestries for Yale College, Wrexham (2002).

Coulouris was a fellow of the Royal Society of Painter-Printmakers. As a member of the League of Socialist Artists, she participated in "United We Stand", a 1974 London exhibition about mining, which featured works by coal miners and professional artists.

In addition to painting, printmaking, and design, Coulouris wrote two short plays with her son, Duncan Wallace.

== Personal life ==
Coulouris married Scottish engineer Gordon Wallace in 1971; they had two children, Saro Wallace (archaeologist), and Duncan Wallace. The couple had a second home in Hydra, Greece, where Coulouris painted seaside scenes.

== Death ==
Coulouris died in 2011 in Edinburgh, Scotland, aged 72, from motor neurone disease. A biography written by her husband was published in 2015.
