= XAM =

Computer-storage standard

XAM, or the eXtensible Access Method, is a standard for computer data storage developed by IBM and EMC and maintained by the Storage Networking Industry Association (SNIA). It was ratified as an ANSI standard by early 2011. XAM is an API for fixed content aware storage devices. XAM replaces the various proprietary interfaces that have been used for this purpose in the past. Content generating applications now have a standard means of saving and finding their content across a broad array of storage devices.

XAM is similar in function to a file-system API such as the POSIX file and directory operations, in that it allows applications to store and retrieve their data. XAM stores application data in XSet objects that also contain metadata.

== See also ==
- Content-addressable storage
