= Skytap =

American cloud computing company

Skytap, Inc.
- Formerly: Illumita
- Type: Private company
- Founded: 2006
- Founder: Brian Bershad; Hank Levy; Steve Gribble
- Headquarters: Seattle, Washington
- Key people: Brad Schick (president and CEO)
- Services: cloud computing
- Number of employees: 100+
- Website: www.skytap.com

Skytap, Inc. is a private company based in Seattle, Washington offering a public service for cloud computing. Skytap provides self-service access to environments for learning, developing, testing, training, and running enterprise applications. The company was founded as Illumita in 2006 and renamed in 2008. Skytap is also offered by IBM to enable enterprises to migrate and modernize their core business applications. The company was purchased by Kyndryl in 2024.

== History ==
Illumita was founded by Brian Bershad, Hank Levy, and Steve Gribble, a trio of University of Washington professors who had done research on virtualization and cloud computing, and by graduate student David Richardson. Illumita changed its name to Skytap in 2008, and launched its first product, Skytap Virtual Lab, in April of the same year. Skytap received early funding from the Washington Research Foundation. As of 2011, the organization is funded by Insight Venture Partners, the Madrona Venture Group, Ignition Partners, Bezos Expeditions, and OpenView Venture Partners. Skytap Virtual Lab expanded in scope, and was renamed Skytap in 2008.

In 2011, Skytap won the Best of VMworld award in the public/hybrid cloud Computing Technologies category for Skytap Cloud, and the company has been named to annual top cloud computing provider lists from Deloitte, Geekwire, Seattle Business Magazine, and the Puget Sound Business Journal.

In March 2018, Skytap added John Ludeman to its leadership team as SVP of Engineering. Ludeman joined Skytap after 30 years of engineering experience at Microsoft.

In August 2019, Thor Culverhouse stepped down as CEO and former CTO Bradley Schick has been tapped as his replacement.

In May 2024, tech infrastructrure multinational Kyndryl Holdings purchased Skytap.

== Skytap ==
Skytap is an enterprise service purpose-built for the development and testing of complex applications. Users can import existing virtualized applications or build new applications in the cloud. Environments can be accessed through any modern web browser, REST-based application programming interface (API), command-line interface (CLI), or application lifecycle management tool (Jenkins, Visual Studio TFS, etc.) Skytap uses a browser-based interface for all system management, and hosts a library of pre-configured virtual machine images. Using either these images or their own imported VMs, users can create sharable configurations of one or more machines, and securely connect to active machines via a proprietary HTML5-based browser client.
