= Xam Wilson Cartiér =

American novelist

Xam Wilson Cartiér (born 1949) is an American writer from St. Louis, Missouri, author of two critically acclaimed novels, Be-Bop, Re-Bop and Muse-Echo Blues. She incorporates the language and rhythm of jazz music into her narratives. Her work is a criticism of racism and promotes black speech and music in her narrative. Cartiér is also a pianist, artist and dancer. Her name "Xam" means harmony in Senegalese.

Cartiér's 1987 book Be-Bop, Re-Bop focuses on the role of jazz in helping the narrator to adapt to the struggles of building a new life and identity. Her other book, Muse-Echo Blues (1991), examines the impact of jazz on black culture. She has been compared to other African-American authors such as Ralph Ellison and Ntozake Shange, whose works examine the connection between music and culture.

== Bibliography ==
- Be-Bop, Re-Bop, Available Press/Ballantine, 1987, ISBN 978-0345348333, 1990 ISBN 978-0345367648.
- "Be-Bop, Re-Bop & All Those Obligates", New American Short Stories 2, anthology, New American Library, 1989.
- Muse-Echo Blues, Harmony, 1991.
- "Be-Bop, Re-Bop", Moment’s Notice: Jazz in Poetry and Prose, anthology, Coffee House Press, 1993.
- "From Be-Bop, Re-Bop," Ain’t But a Place: An Anthology of African American Writings About St. Louis, Missouri Historical Society Press, 1998.
- "A Gypsy in Germany", Essence, 1992.
