= Honeycomb (2022 film) =

2022 American horror film

- Directed by: Avalon Fast
- Written by: Avalon Fast
- Produced by: Avalon Fast
- Starring: Rowan Wales; Sophie Bawks-Smith; Jillian Frank; Destini Stewart; Mari Geraghty
- Edited by: Avalon Fast
- Music by: Max Graham
- Release date: 27 January 2022 (Slamdance)
- Running time: 70 minutes
- Country: Canada
- Language: English

Honeycomb is a 2022 Canadian horror film directed and co-written by Avalon Fast in her feature directorial debut. It stars Rowan Wales, Sophie Bawks-Smith, Jillian Frank, Destini Stewart and Mari Geraghty.

It premiered virtually at the Slamdance Film Festival on 27 January 2022, and had its Canadian premiere at the 2022 Fantasia Film Festival.

== Cast ==
- Rowan Wales as Millie
- Sophie Bawks-Smith as Willow
- Jillian Frank as Jules
- Destini Stewart as Leader
- Mari Geraghty as Vicky

== Production ==
Filming took place during 2019 on Cortes Island, British Columbia, Canada.

== Reception ==
=== Critical response ===
On Rotten Tomatoes, the film holds an approval rating of 87% based on 15 reviews, with an average rating of 6.30/10.
