= George Coulouris (computer scientist) =

British computer scientist (1937–2024)

- Born: 15 November 1937; New York City, U.S.
- Died: 18 November 2024 (aged 87); London, England
- Known for: Content Addressable File Store, Em Unix text editor, Distributed Systems textbook
- Scientific career
- Workplaces: Queen Mary, University of London; University of Cambridge; IBM; Imperial College London
- Website: www.coulouris.net www.eecs.qmul.ac.uk/~gc

George F. Coulouris (15 November 1937 – 18 November 2024) was a British computer scientist. He was an emeritus professor of Queen Mary, University of London and formerly visiting professor in residence at University of Cambridge Computer Laboratory. He was co-author of a textbook on distributed systems. He was instrumental in the development of ICL's Content Addressable File Store (CAFS) and he developed em, the Unix editor, which inspired Bill Joy to write vi.

== Education ==
He was born 15 November 1937, the son of actor George Coulouris, of Greek heritage. His sister was artist Mary Louise Coulouris. In 1960 he graduated with an honours degree in Physics from University College London.

== Career ==
Coulouris worked at IBM and other companies before joining the London Institute of Computer Science as a Research Assistant and then Imperial College London as a lecturer in 1965, and that same year started working on the Institute's content-addressable file store. This improved the speed of directory inquiries by British Telecom. In 1971 he changed jobs and became professor in Computer Science at Queen Mary College, and worked on mainframe designs.

He built a computer lab (in an old movie theater) and worked on interactive computing; his lab was the country's first to use Unix, and he wrote an interactive editor which was the basis for vi, a text editor.

At Queen Mary College he became a reader in 1973 and a professor in 1978. He retired from Queen Mary in 1998, but continued as a visiting professor at the University of Cambridge.

George Coulouris died on 18 November 2024, at the age of 87.

== Publications ==
See list of 101 publications on Google Scholar
