= Sun StorageTek 5800 System =

The Sun StorageTek 5800 System (codename: Honeycomb) is an object-based storage system from Sun Microsystems that uses a symmetric clustered design with both processing and storage functions within a system cell. It is designed for data archive, repository, and distribution applications used by institutions to store large amounts of digital information such as medical information, e-Research, rich media, and digitized historical records.

With a customer-definable metadata schema, the system offers the ability to program the entire indexing schema used to tag and search data. This solution combines a fully native design with systems expertise to create a storage system that runs the Solaris operating system and leverages Java development tools to drive a closer integration between compute and store assets in a data center.
