= Timeline of LiveJournal =

This is a timeline of events in the history of the virtual community LiveJournal.

== 1999 ==
- March 18, 1999 — LiveJournal starts (first entry ever: , however the earliest dated entry is from November 1997 , possibly copied from the founder's personal website; first version of the server code: )
- April 14, 1999 — LiveJournal domain officially registered
- November 17, 1999 — Creation of the news journal

== 2000 ==
- February 14, 2000 — The first Macintosh Client is released by Aaron Eiche
- April 1, 2000 — Message boards (comments on entries)
- May 21, 2000 — Subject lines for entries
- August 2, 2000 — Interests
- August 3, 2000 — First version of the Directory Search in beta test
- August 15, 2000 — First version of the support board (earliest surviving support request: )
- August 22, 2000 — Topic directory (now defunct)
- August 25, 2000 — Text messaging
- September 13, 2000 — First paid-account benefits
- November 14, 2000 — LJ user visions releases the first version of his Windows client
- December 1, 2000 — Creation of the changelog journal
- December 16, 2000 — Communities

== 2001 ==
- January 12, 2001 — Introduction of the Dystopia site scheme
- March 16, 2001 — First Permanent Account Sale "100 people, 100 bucks" to Raise Funds for new Alpha Database Server
- March 18, 2001 — User polls
- March 24, 2001 — LiveJournal server code goes open-source
- May 16, 2001 — First support privilege: supporthelp
- September 2, 2001 — Invite codes are introduced
- November 4, 2001 — avva becomes first full-time employee

== 2002 ==
- January 1, 2002 — bradfitz posts about Mirrors On Shoes' LiveJournal Song
- January 5, 2002 — First purging run (freeing deleted usernames)
- February 2, 2002 — Database clustering
- April 1, 2002 — New support category: Communities
- April 14, 2002 — Switch to UTF-8
- May 3, 2002 — Web interface starts getting translated into other languages
- July 3, 2002 — Zilla (bug and project tracking database) created (first entry:)
- July 8, 2002 — RSS syndication
- August 22, 2002 — Support introduces interim privileges
- November 26, 2002 — Support category Customization closed
- December 29, 2002 — New support category: Syndication

== 2003 ==
- January 16, 2003 — Style System 2 (S2) enters beta-test
- March 18, 2003 — Introduction of the XColibur site scheme
- April 11, 2003 — One million accounts reached
- October 24, 2003 — Post by e-mail
- October 29, 2003 — New support category: Style Systems
- November 12, 2003 — Post by phone
- December 12, 2003 — Invite codes are removed
- December 12, 2003 — LiveJournal begins airing commercials in movie theatres in San Francisco, Portland, Seattle, and Denver.
- December 17, 2003 — Unused invite codes can be used to obtain LiveJournal coupons until December 31

== 2004 ==
- January 2, 2004 — Secure logins and password changes
- January 29, 2004 — Two million accounts reached
- February 12, 2004 — First colorbar created
- May 12, 2004 — LiveJournal wins "People's Voice" Webby Awards in "Community" category
- July 22, 2004 — LiveJournal opens up photo hosting with FotoBilder
- November 1, 2004 — Site reaches 5 million accounts.
- November 19, 2004 — Rachelle Waterman's LiveJournal achieves notoriety when she is arrested and accused of orchestrating the murder of her mother

== 2005 ==
- January 5, 2005 — Brad Fitzpatrick sells Danga Interactive and LiveJournal to Six Apart for an undisclosed amount over $1 million , ,
- January 14 and January 15, 2005 — The colocation centre company where the LiveJournal servers are stored, Internap, suffers a major power failure. This results in the entire site being unavailable for over 24 hours whilst Fitzpatrick and his fellow system administrators work to bring 100 servers back online. The news makes the news site Slashdot at 03:30 GMT. This event is commonly referred to as the Great LJ Blackout of 2005.
- April 22, 2005 — 2nd annual template-design contest winners announced: A Novel Conundrum, 3 Column Style, Tranquility II, Flexible Squares and Nebula.
- June 1, 2005 — Several updates: Phone posts now default to .mp3 format, majority of winning templates from Style Contest added as options for users, one-time purging from servers of all accounts deleted for over 30 days.
- June 7, 2005 — LiveJournal holds a 24-hour permanent account sale for $150 per account.
- June 15, 2005 — LiveJournal introduces full support for tags.
- July 19, 2005 — New support category Issue Investigation, while Embedding and Press are closed.
- November 18–19, 2005 — Data center is moved from Internap at Seattle to Six Apart Headquarters at San Francisco.
- December 15, 2005 — Holiday gifts (permanent upgrades) given to users: 10 GB of storage space to permanent account holders, 1 GB of storage space to paid accounts, twice as many userpics (from 3 to 6) for free accounts

== 2006 ==
- January 19, 2006 — Due to web browser related security concerns, the URL scheme for users' content was changed, making what used to be an optional Paid only feature a standard feature for all users.
- February 10, 2006 — Introduced Virtual Gifts. For a small cost, users can now send "gifts" such as roses or balloons to a friend's userpage, where they will remain for two weeks before fading away. The feature was originally introduced for Valentine's Day, but is to continue after the holiday has passed.
- March 15, 2006 — In a gift to paid account users, the userpic limit was raised to 30. Also, loyalty userpics were added, giving extra userpics to paid users who have supported the site over the years. Permanent account holders were given the maximum of 132. Two new Virtual Gifts were added, a Good Luck Clover and Bubbly Brew, to celebrate the St. Patrick's Day holiday. A Flash player was added to voiceposts, assisting users by allowing them to play posts in .mp3 format right in the post. Finally, a new intern, user burr86, was added to assist with the site bug and issue database.
- April 10, 2006 — Site reaches 10 million accounts.
- April 18, 2006 — "Sponsored+" accounts are introduced, which feature ads.
- May/June, 2006 — Controversy arises when LJ Abuse team warns several users to remove default user pictures containing images of breastfeeding. The owners of some of the user pictures feel that they should be permitted to keep them because they depict breastfeeding rather than "explicitly sexual content", the latter being the phrase used in the Terms of Service. LiveJournal changes its long-standing policy on inappropriate default user pictures, but some users, feeling the policy is wrong, elect to allow their journals to be suspended or delete them themselves. Others start to display protest userpics, write letters to LJ Abuse and Six Apart.
- June 6, 2006 — A number of users staged a one-day boycott of LiveJournal in concern about LJ's abuses policy on breastfeeding images and about the broader issues of ToS and Customer Service. Participating users temporarily deleted their journal for a time spanning from 12:01 am to 11:59 pm in hopes that the drastic drop in journals on that day would bring attention to their cause.
- August 25, 2006 — With help from parent company Six Apart, LiveJournal offers new layout options to both "Plus" and paid accounts. "Plus" users receive partial access to the new Expressive themes (paid accounts may use any), as well as the previously paid-account-only Component. "The Boxer" layout remains the sole Paid-account only layout.
- August 28, 2006 — Site reaches 11 million accounts.
- September 29, 2006 — LiveJournal announces "sponsored communities" and "sponsored features" .
- October 11, 2006 — TxtLJ, a feature for interacting with LiveJournal through SMS text messages sponsored by Amp'd Mobile, was opened up to paid and permanent members.
- October 12, 2006 — LiveJournal officially announces its integrated XMPP service LJ Talk, with the ability to post journal entries through instant messaging, username icon Contextual Hover Menus for LJ Talk login status and user links, and optimized XMPP client Gizmo5 for LJ Talk.
- November 4, 2006 — Servers managing LiveJournal blogs suffer a massive power outage. Six Apart makes an "offline" page visible through the entire LiveJournal network, which some users considered to be crude.

== 2007 ==
- January 9, 2007 — Site reaches 12 million accounts.
- February 2007 — LiveJournal schools team remove military schools from their Schools Directory in accordance with the policy of listing only degree-granting and/or accredited institutions, irritating those users who went to such schools.
- March 12, 2007 - LiveJournal establishes a new support category, SUP Services for handling requests pertaining to SUP. Users cannot submit requests directly into this category, but rather requests are moved from other categories to it.
- May 24, 2007 - Site reaches 13 million accounts.
- May 29, 2007 - LiveJournal Abuse suspends roughly 500 accounts (0.004% of its network) for perceived Terms of Service Violations.
- May 31, 2007 - Barak Berkowitz, CEO of Six Apart, issues statements on the suspensions and indicates some of them will be reversed.
- June 21, 2007 - LJ has a rare, week-long Permanent Account sale for the same price as previous $150. (The last offering was in June 2005). $25 from every sale, for the first 36 hours, goes to one (or some to all) of four charities the purchaser could select.
- July 24, 2007 - Servers managing LiveJournal blogs suffer a massive power outage. Again Six Apart makes an "offline" page visible through the entire LiveJournal network.
- August 2, 2007 - LiveJournal users are banned without notice for depicting art "depicting minors in explicit sexual situations". Outraged users spam and protest until LiveJournal addresses the deletion on August 7.
- October 11, 2007 - Site reaches 14 million accounts.
- December 2, 2007 - Six Apart announces the sale of LiveJournal to SUP Services and the founding of LiveJournal, Inc

== 2008 ==
- March 12, 2008 - SUP Services (the site owner) remove Basic accounts from the new registration forms.
- March 15, 2008 - LJ users notice certain interests being blocked from the "Top 100" list. These interests include bisexuality, depression, faeries, girls, boys, and fanfiction.
- March 17, 2008 - The filter on the Top 100 list is removed, returning the blocked interests to the list.
- July 11, 2008 - Beta testing and feedback begins on a possible redesign of the profile layout.
- July 17, 2008 - LJ announces the return of Basic accounts by the end of the northern hemisphere's summer.
- October 26, 2008 LJ servers down starting around 10 Am EST
- November 18, 2008 - LJ servers move to new home in Billings, Montana USA.
- December 4, 2008 - LJ has a rare, week-long Permanent Account sale - price goes up to $175. (The last offering was in June 2007 for $150). $25 from every sale, for the first 36 hours, can be directed to one of select thousands of charities through its new partner, Razoo. Userpics for both new and existing permanent account holders are raised to 150, and disk space for these folks is raised to 15GB.

== 2009 ==
- January 6, 2009 - LiveJournal lays off around a dozen staff in San Francisco and Moscow, including its vice-president.

== 2014 ==
- May 18, 2014 - After a decade of a consistent layout, LiveJournal launches a new user interface and homepage, with a focus on ranking journals by popularity.

== 2017 ==
- April 4, 2017 - Control of LiveJournal as a blogging platform has been transferred to SUP Media LLC, a legal entity based in the Russian Federation. LiveJournal's new terms of service are in the Russian language, with a non-binding English translation also provided. They require compliance with Russian laws banning political solicitation, criticism of the Russian government, or promotion of homosexuality. They also require high-volume journals (with 3000 or more visitors per day) to conform to a "draconian" Russian media law requiring registration with the Russian government and banning anonymous or pseudonymous publication. It is no longer possible to prevent ads from appearing to other readers of a journal by paying for the journal; instead, advertisements are now shown on all LJ pages unless the person viewing the page has a paid account and is logged in. Professional accounts now have 100GB of disk available while Permanent accounts have 1TB available. Current pay as you go accounts have their duration extended by 50%.
