= Oskolkov =

Oskolkov (Russian: Осколков, from oskolok meaning a splinter) is a Russian masculine surname, its feminine counterpart is Oskolkova. It may refer to:

- Albert Oskolkov (born 1973), Russian football player
- Ilya Oskolkov-Tsentsiper (born 1967), Russian social designer, media manager and entrepreneur
