= Andrew Paulson =

American entrepreneur

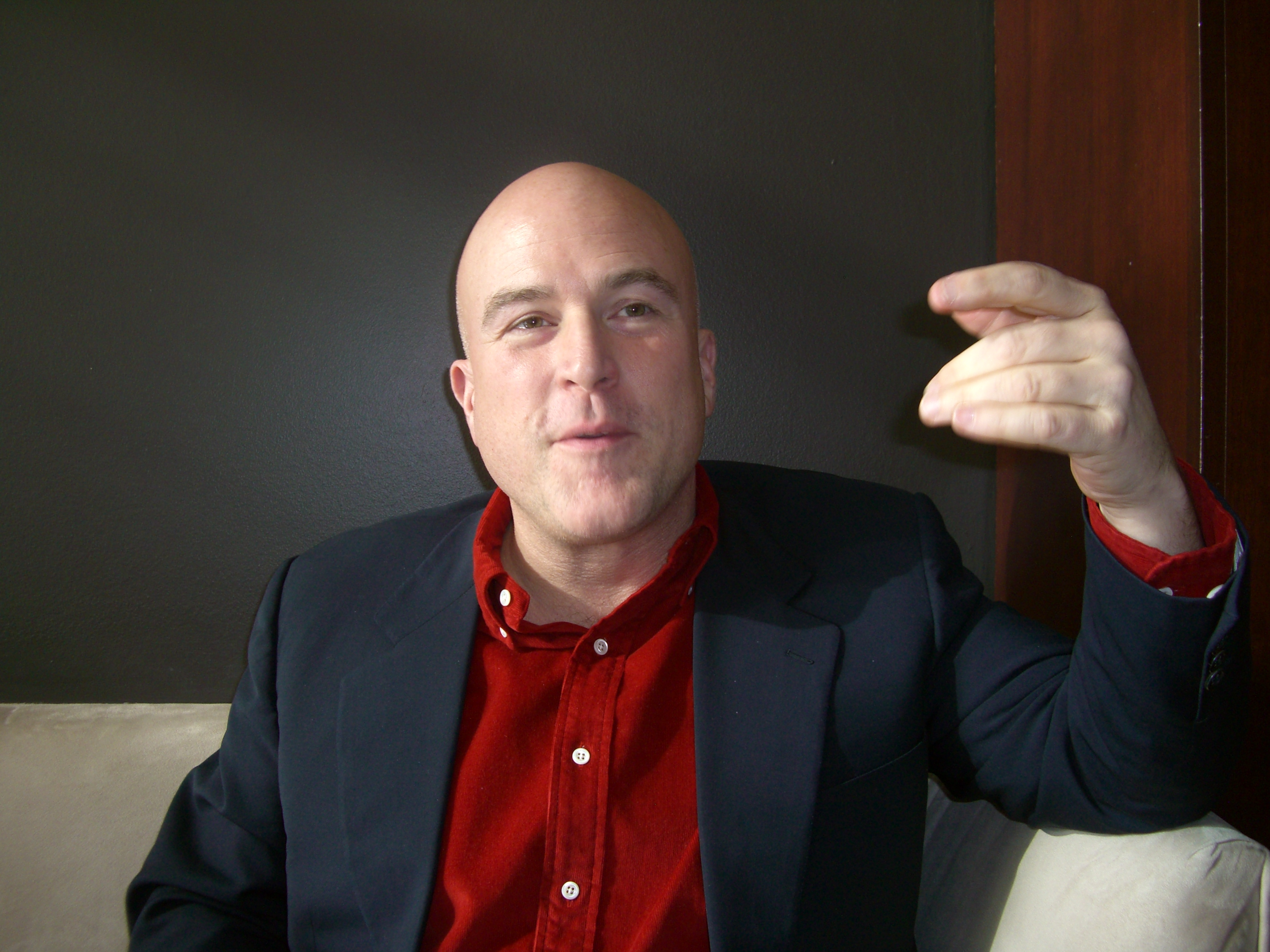
- Born: Andrew Meredith Paulson; November 13, 1958; Champaign, Illinois, United States
- Died: July 18, 2017 (aged 58); London, United Kingdom
- Education: Yale University (BA)
- Occupation: Entrepreneur

Andrew Meredith Paulson (November 13, 1958 – July 18, 2017) was an American entrepreneur. Born in Champaign, Illinois, he was the son of noted American professor Ronald Paulson.

== Biography ==
During his early years he worked with oncology and neurophysiology researchers at Johns Hopkins Hospital, Yale University and at the Woods Hole Oceanographic Institution. As an undergraduate he ran the classical music program at WYBC, a commercial radio station, and founded The New Theater Company where he produced and directed numerous plays.

Paulson graduated with a BA in French Literature and Literary Criticism from Yale University in 1981, and attended the Yale School of Drama. From 1982 to 86 he lived in Berlin and Paris, writing novels; from 1987 to 93 he lived in Paris, London and Milan, shooting fashion and advertising photography. During this period he co-founded (with Gilles Dusein) the Paris conceptual photography gallery Urbi et Orbi, and co-founded (with Kurt Novack) a graphic design studio, Pourriture Noble.

In 1991, David Hirson’s celebrated play La Bête was premiered on Broadway and in London. Valère, the principal character, is said to be largely based on the young Paulson. The Molière-inspired comedy, written in rhyming iambic pentameter, is set in 17th-century France and Valère’s 30-minute manic monologue, a theatrical tour-de-force, has become a staple of the modern American repertory. The play was reprised in 2010 on Broadway and in the West End, with Mark Rylance as Valère. In October, 2013, another play -- Virtual, or the Life and Adventures of Andrew Paulson, Entrepreneur (Виртуал, или Жизнь и Приключения Эндрю Полсона, Предпринимателя) -- written by Julia Idlis, commissioned by Theatre Praktika (Moscow) premiered as part of its highly regarded series "Человек.doc".

First invited to Russia by Dmitri Hvorostovsky to make a photo-reportage in the summer of 1993, Paulson began developing publishing projects in Moscow: Delovie Lyudi (Russian: Деловые люди) for the French Groupe Hersant, Ponedyelnik (Russian:Понедельник), an independent news/business weekly in partnership with Len Blavatnik, and Vechernyaya Moskva (Russian: Вечерняя Москва) a bi-weekly entertainment listings publication.

Shortly after the 1998 Russian financial crisis, Paulson, together with Anton Kudryashov and Ilya Oskolkov-Tsentsiper, founded Afisha, an entertainment and listings magazine that became the cultural touchstone of Moscow and St. Petersburg. Bolshoi Gorod (Russian: Большой Город), a free bi-weekly ”Sunday Magazine Section to a daily newspaper that doesn’t exist", was launched in 2002, and MIR, a monthly glossy travel magazine, was launched in 2003. To this day, Afisha Publishing House sets the high-water mark for local entertainment magazine publishing in Russia and has produced a generation of journalists now transforming the popular culture's landscape. The business was acquired by the Russian media group ProfMedia in 2005.

In 2006, Paulson with Alexander Mamut founded SUP Media, which became one of the Russia's largest online media companies, consisting of LiveJournal (the principal blogging platform/social network in Russia during 2000's), Championat (notable sports site in Russia in 2000's), Gazeta.Ru (popular news site in Russia), and an online sales house +SOL. In 2009, Kommersant Publishing House acquired a shareholding in SUP; Paulson was chairman of the Board of Directors.

In 2012, Paulson founded AGON Ltd, which was accorded the exclusive, long-term rights from FIDE (World Chess Federation) to develop, organize and commercialize the World Chess Championship cycle. The first events were to be held in 2013 in London, Lisbon, Madrid, Paris, Berlin and Istanbul. In October 2013 he was elected president of the English Chess Federation. He resigned six months later.

Paulson was on the advisory boards of several charities, foundations and technology companies: The Human Dignity Trust, The Weidenfeld Scholarships at Oxford, State, and M.I.P.R..

He died on July 18, 2017, in London from lung cancer.
