= Perkeep =

Set of open-source formats, protocols, and software

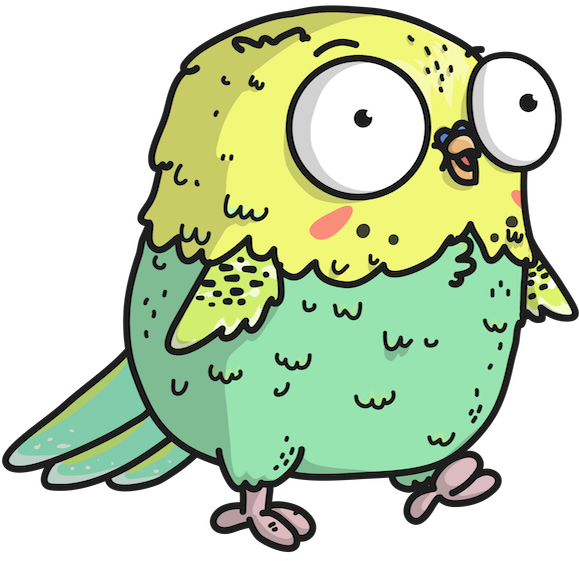
- Developer: Brad Fitzpatrick
- Stable release: 0.12 ("Toronto") / 11 November 2025
- Preview release: 0.12 ("Toronto") / 11 November 2025
- Repository: github.com/perkeep/perkeep
- Written in: Go
- Operating system: Cross-platform
- Type: Data store
- License: Apache License 2.0
- Website: perkeep.org

Perkeep (previously Camlistore, Content-Addressable Multi-Layer Indexed Storage) is a set of open-source formats, protocols, and software for modeling, storing, searching, sharing, and synchronizing data.

== Storage ==
Perkeep's content-addressable storage is based on GPG-signed claims. These claims provide modeling, storing, searching, sharing, and synchronization of data. Perkeep can be thought of as Git for general personal information storage: a user's Perkeep is the main repository. Perkeep is graph-based rather than a working tree in data model terminology. Perkeep can store files like a traditional file system, but it specializes in storing objects such as pictures and videos.

== Development ==
The Perkeep project is under active development led by Brad Fitzpatrick, a former Google employee (originally as a 20% Project), and co-maintainer Mathieu Lonjaret. The project has two goals: expand the standard library of the Go programming language, and implementing Perkeep open source formats, protocols, and software for modeling, storing, searching, sharing of a long-term, personal datastore system.
