= Dax Holt =

American television personality

- Born: August 3, 1982 (age 43); Denver, Colorado, U.S.
- Education: Santa Ana Community College; California State Fullerton
- Occupation: Entertainment News Host
- Known for: TMZ
- Website: http://daxholt.com/

Dax Holt (August 3, 1982) is an American entertainment reporter and podcaster. He was a TMZ on TV on-air correspondent for 11 years and is the co-founder of the fantasy football trophy company TrophySmack, and a co-host of the Hollywood Raw Podcast.

== Early life and education ==
Holt was born in Denver, Colorado, and attended Santa Ana Community College where he was involved in the TV news program. He got an internship with Extra.

== Career ==
In 2007, Holt joined TMZ as an on air-correspondent. During his time at TMZ, he received two Daytime Emmy nominations as a producer, in 2014 and 2016.

After leaving TMZ, Holt hosted a celebrity talk show with the celebrity news YouTube channel Hollywood Pipeline called Straight From the Source.

In 2016, he took part in a contest created to find Kelly Ripa's new co-host for Live with Kelly after the departure of Michael Strahan. He finished second.

In 2020, Dax and co-host Adam Glyn launched the Hollywood Raw podcast.

In 2021, he appeared on Shark Tank to get a deal for his newest company, TrophySmack. With co-founder and business partner Matt Walsh he landed a six-figure deal with Mark Cuban.

== Personal life ==
Dax currently lives in Anaheim, California with his wife, Denise, and his two children.
