= Dreamwidth =

Online journal service based on the LiveJournal codebase

Dreamwidth website
- Website type: Blog/Social Network
- Available in: English
- Owners: Denise Paolucci and Mark Smith
- Website: www.dreamwidth.org
- Commercial: Yes

Dreamwidth software
- Written in: Perl, JavaScript
- License: GNU GPL
- Repository: github.com/dreamwidth/dreamwidth

Dreamwidth is an online journal service based on the LiveJournal codebase. It is a code fork of the original service, set up by ex-LiveJournal staff Denise Paolucci and Mark Smith, born out of a desire for a new community based on open access, transparency, freedom and respect.

Dreamwidth was announced on 11 June 2008, went into open beta on 30 April 2009, and was taken out of beta on 30 April 2011.

== Features ==
For the most part, features are similar to those of LiveJournal: users have journals, where they may post entries, each of which has a webpage of its own, and on which other users may comment. Dreamwidth also provides shared or group journals called "communities".

Areas in which Dreamwidth differs significantly from LiveJournal include the following:

=== Accounts ===
Initially, Dreamwidth accounts could only be created with an invite code. In December 2011, invite codes were turned off, originally as an experimental temporary measure. As there was no significant increase in spam accounts and the servers were adjusted to handle the load, the invite codes were not turned back on at the start of the new year as planned, and new users can still create an account without the use of an invite code.

Free accounts have limited features. Paid accounts exist on two levels, "Paid" and "Premium Paid", and have additional features.

=== Search ===
In addition to the search facilities brought over from LiveJournal, paid account users can search their journal. This was introduced on 24 July 2009.

=== Advertising ===
LiveJournal was initially free of advertisements, but gradually incorporated them, until by 2017 ads were shown to all non-paid readers on all pages. Dreamwidth remains free of advertisements.

=== Features ===
The following features, available on LiveJournal, are not available on Dreamwidth:

- S1 style system
- to-do lists
- TxtLJ
- pingbacks
- nudge
- Last.fm music detection
- singles
- commenting using Facebook and Twitter accounts

== Development ==
Dreamwidth is based upon the free and open-source server software that was designed to run LiveJournal. It is written primarily in Perl. The majority of the Dreamwidth code is available under the GPL for other sites to use.

Unlike many other social networking sites using the LiveJournal codebase, such as InsaneJournal and DeadJournal, Dreamwidth is a code fork, removing unwanted features (such as advertising) and adding new ones as described above. Founders of the site rejected the advertising model as intrusive. Instead, they implemented a payment system, where users can purchase add-on or premium features.

A 2009 OSCON presentation saw Dreamwidth identified as highly unusual among open-source projects, for the number of women on its development team. About 75% of its developers are female, compared with around 1.5% in the field as a whole. Paolucci and Smith also spoke at linux.conf.au 2010 about Dreamwidth's development model and have been invited to speak at Web 2.0 Expo and OSCON about their techniques.

Dreamwidth was accepted as a GSoC mentoring organization for the summer of 2010. They were allotted seven students, who worked on a variety of projects.

== Staff ==
Athena, also known as Afuna or fu, was introduced as the site's first paid employee on 7 April 2010. On 7 September 2010, Mark Smith announced that he had stepped back from Dreamwidth's front line and moved to work for StumbleUpon. He is still an owner of Dreamwidth along with Denise, however.

== Influence ==
Following the positive reactions to Dreamwidth's diversity statement and model of inclusiveness, various other projects have followed suit, including Python's diversity list and Dreamfish.

== See also ==
- List of social networking websites
