= Afisha =

Former Russian entertainment and lifestyle magazine

Afisha Афиша
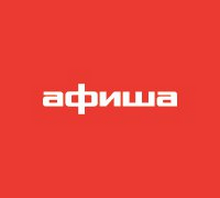

- Logo and cover
- Categories: Entertainment, art, lifestyle, social issues
- Frequency: twice a month (before 2015), monthly (2015)
- Founder: Ilya Oskolkov-Tsentsiper
- First issue: April, 1999
- Final issue: December, 2015
- Company: Rambler&Co
- Country: Russia
- Based in: Moscow
- Website: mag.afisha.ru

Afisha (Russian: Афиша, lit. 'poster') was a Russian entertainment and lifestyle magazine published from April 1999 to December 2015 in Moscow, Saint Petersburg and 12 other Russia's major cities. In its peak years Afisha's readership reached approximately 1.5 million people. Its online version remains one of Russia’s most popular media brands with a monthly Internet audience of more than 4.5 million.

== History ==
Founded in April 1999 by Moscow journalist Ilya Oskolkov-Tsentsiper, American entrepreneur Andrew Paulson and businessman Anton Kudryashov Afisha was intended as Moscow's version of Time Out which Oskolkov-Tsentsiper and Paulson tried and failed to license. It quickly outgrew its initial purpose as a bi-weekly listing magazine and ended up having a profound effect on Moscow’s cultural and nightlife scene. In the next 10 years Afisha turned into a Russia's leading publishing house by launching an array of spin-off publications such as monthly travel magazine Afisha-Mir, alternative weekly Bolshoy Gorod, food magazine Afisha-Yeda and a series of Afisha-branded travel guide books.

A team of young journalists, designers and photographers brought together by Oskolkov-Tsentsiper created a unique Afisha style which had a major impact on Russian media. Many high-profile Russian artists made their first public appearances on Afisha's front cover and the magazine popularised several new fashion trends – even introducing numerous new words into the Russian lexicon, from “deadline” to “hipster”. A number of Russia's now prominent cultural figures started their careers writing for Afisha including film directors Avdotya Smirnova, Mikhail Brashinskiy and Roman Volobuev, award-winning writers Lev Danilkin and Yulia Yakovleva and Elena Kovalskaya who went on to become artistic director of Moscow’s Meyerhold Theater.

Afisha played an active part in 2011–2013 Russian protests with its senior stuff helping to organise rallies in Moscow, publishing manifestos demanding fair election and at some point putting the opposition leader Alexei Navalny on the print edition's cover. A 2013 issue with a rainbow flag on its cover and the story "27 stories from the lives of Russian gays" played an important role in the LGBT movement in Russia.

In 2014 Afisha's parent company ProfMedia was bought by a Russian state-owned energy corporation Gazprom. Soon after the new owners shuttered the magazine's struggling print edition and fired most of the editorial staff. Plans to relaunch the Afisha as a quarterly were announced but never realized.

== Online ==
In 2013 Afisha launched daily updated sites "Vozduh", "Volna" and "Gorod", promptly telling about the latest developments in sphere of culture, music and life in Moscow, and "Serialy" - Russia's largest online television series library.

== Afisha Picnic ==
Annually the magazine held a music festival Afisha Picnic, a one-day outdoor festival held in Moscow, Russia every summer. It took place on the territory of Kolomenskoye, a former tsar’s estate, now a state-owned historical, architectural and nature reserve museum, located only 10 km south-east of the city center. Since its start in 2004, the Afisha Picnic has followed the concept that mixes professional music festival featuring performances of international artists and local independent musicians, and urban-style event with all sorts of entertainment, such as designers’ market, gastronomic area, games and crafts, sports and amusements, lectures and workshops, and, on one occasion, even a dance floor on the rollerdrome. The festival was visited by 50,000 visitors that spread out over 1,000 acres (4.0 km^{2}) of land.
