= TMZ =

American celebrity tabloid news website

- Website type: Tabloid journalism
- Available in: English, Spanish
- Owner: Fox Corporation
- Creators: Harvey Levin; Jim Paratore
- Editor: Harvey Levin
- Key people: Charles Latibeaudiere
- Parent: Telepictures (2005–2021); Fox Entertainment (2021–present)
- Website: tmz.com
- Commercial: Yes
- Registration: Optional
- Launched: November 8, 2005; 21 years ago
- Current status: Active

TMZ is an American entertainment-focused tabloid news organization owned by Fox Corporation. It made its debut on November 8, 2005, as a collaboration between AOL and Telepictures, a division of Warner Bros. Entertainment, until Time Warner divested AOL in 2009. On September 13, 2021, Fox Corporation acquired TMZ from WarnerMedia for $50 million.

TMZ's founder and managing editor is Harvey Levin, a lawyer-turned-journalist who was previously a legal expert for the Los Angeles television station KCBS-TV. The name is short for "thirty-mile zone", this being another name for the studio zone surrounding Hollywood.

== Development ==
Three months before TMZ's official launch, America Online (AOL) had indicated its intention to create a Hollywood and entertainment-focused news site in collaboration with Telepictures Productions. During this pre-launch period, AOL expressed interest in establishing a website with a primary emphasis on celebrities. Upon the site's official launch, AOL confirmed that it would predominantly showcase Hollywood gossip, encompassing interviews, photos, and video content featuring celebrities. Additionally, the platform would provide information related to industry news, covering movies, television shows, and more.

The site was described as "an effort to further feed the current American obsession with celebrities". Mike Shields of MediaWeek.com wrote, "the site also boasts of an expansive collection of archived star photos and videos", allowing fans to "trace changing hairlines and waistlines of their favorites performers over the years".

In March 2026, The New York Times saluted the website's newfound "name-and-shame political coverage", while, in April 2026, The New Yorker's Paula Mejía wrote that TMZ had begun to engage in political reportage.

== Company synopsis ==
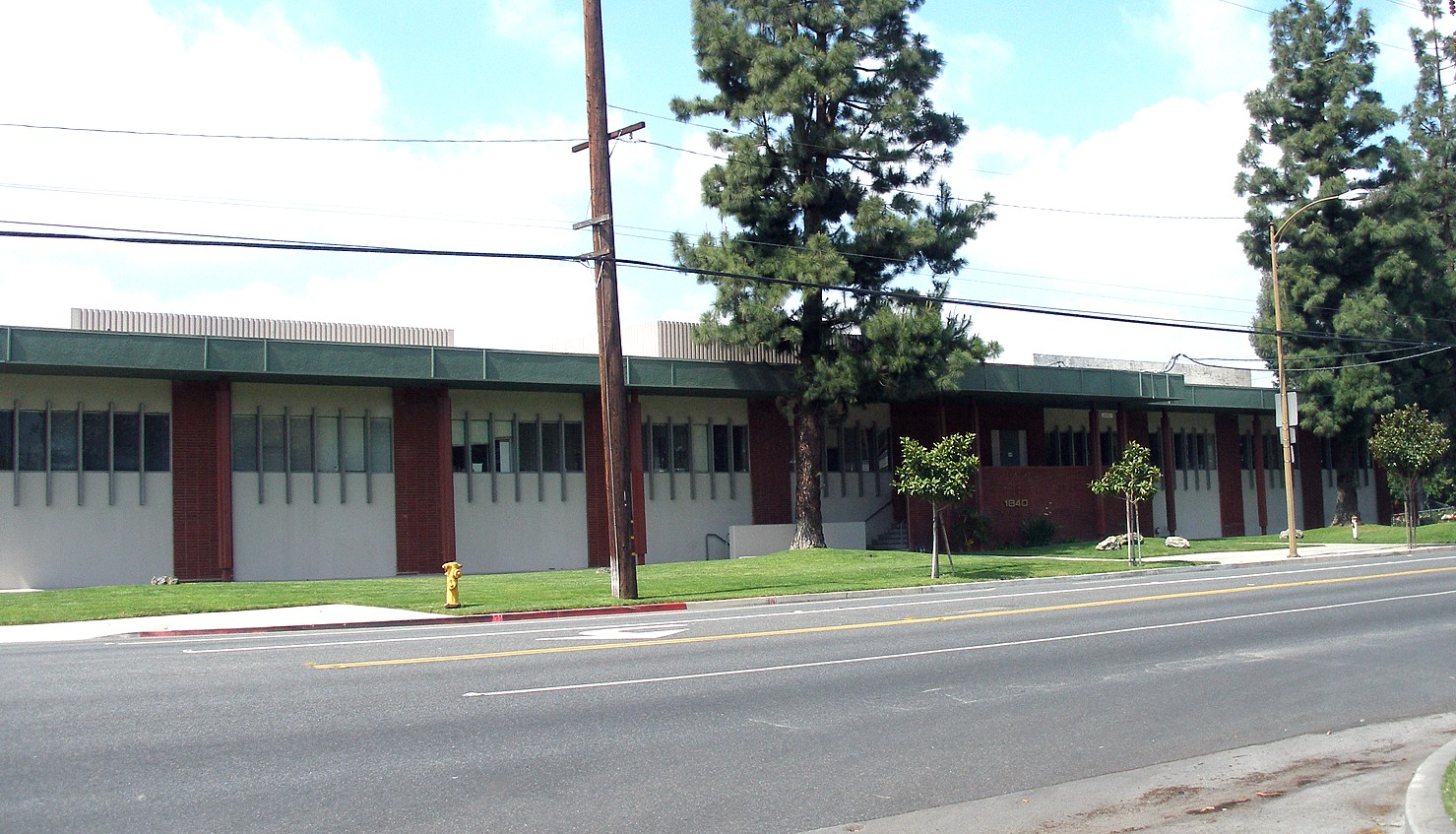
Victory Studios in Glendale, California (pictured here in 2007), where TMZ launched. TMZ later relocated to Sunset Blvd, Los Angeles. Since April 2013, TMZ is located in Playa Vista, California.

Since 2005, TMZ has signed New Line Cinema, Hilton Hotels, Chrysler, and Revlon as charter advertisers to its website. The New York Times called TMZ "one of the most successful online ventures of the last few years." In October 2008, The New York Times reported that TMZ, at the time, was receiving more than 10 million viewers every month.

Levin has acknowledged that TMZ has passed on multiple notable stories because he felt that, while the stories were true, he questioned how the sources obtained their information. He has acknowledged that TMZ pays sources, but in the form of a "tip fee". Levin has said that TMZ pays for photos and for "tips" or leads on stories, and that the sources and tips are verified before being used or reported.

In November 2009, TMZ's revenue was publicly disclosed for the first time. Telepictures (which operates TMZ) wrote: "Subject to certain performance adjustments and the reimbursement of expenses, revenues are split evenly between the parties [...] Telepictures received payments of US$6.2 million for the nine months ended September 30, 2009, and US$12.7 million, US$9.6 million and US$3.0 million in 2008, 2007 and 2006, respectively." Based on released figures, TMZ's revenues for 2008 was US$25.4 million and it was projected to have less revenue in 2009, with revenue of $12.4 million in first three quarters of the year—unlike the previous year, which was within the US$15 million range.

On May 29, 2012, co-founder Jim Paratore died of a heart attack during a cycling trip in France. Paratore was known for his work in television production, producing several daytime and syndicated programs, particularly while serving as an executive at Telepictures (which co-produced the website's companion syndicated television series).

== Legal issues ==
=== Contempt-of-court motion ===
On June 20, 2007, a court-appointed bankruptcy trustee filed an emergency motion requesting that the TMZ website be held in contempt for publishing the entire manuscript of If I Did It: Confessions of the Killer, O. J. Simpson's purportedly fictionalized account of the murder of Ron Goldman and Nicole Brown Simpson.

The filing claimed TMZ's posting of the PDF of the entire book "diminished or destroyed" its value.

=== Temporary block in the UK ===
On December 24, 2010, the gossip blog "Oh No They Didn't" reported that TMZ began blocking traffic from the UK, displaying the message: "Due to laws within your region, you are unable to view this website." Asked for comment, TMZ said the blocking was due to "legal restrictions" related to English defamation law. The UK website "Popbitch Board" noted on December 31, 2010, that it is possible to get around the block by accessing the website through the Google Translate website. As of March 25, 2026, TMZ is accessible in the UK.

== Branches ==
=== TMZ Live ===
TMZ Live is a live-chat program from TMZ that features Levin and fellow TMZ executive producer Charles Latibeaudiere, and occasionally, TMZ Sports' host and executive producer, Michael Babcock, filling in for one or both hosts. Other TMZ staffers (mainly those who regularly appear on TMZ on TV) also appear on the broadcast as contributors to provide additional outlines of stories and to provide opinion. The live webcast takes place at the TMZ offices in Los Angeles, and is broadcast on TMZ.com Monday through Fridays from approximately 1:30 to 3:00 p.m. Eastern Time (the length varies depending on the featured segments).

The TMZ Live television and Internet programs review stories that TMZ is covering on the website, and sometimes feature live interviews (most conducted through webcam conferencing) and viewer opinions via Twitter, telephone, and video chat (including Skype). In addition, the program features regular segments toward the end of each edition. "Viewer's Choice" is the penultimate segment and features viewer questions or comments about stories featured in the broadcast, with additional commentary or analysis by the hosts. In "Hate Mail," featured on the Wednesday edition of the webcast (the Thursday edition on the television broadcast), critical emails and letters sent by viewers (some of which feature potshots at Levin or Latibeaudiere) are read by the hosts.

In "Tim's Rejects," featured on the Thursday edition of the webcast (the Friday edition on the television broadcast), staffer Tim Nowak presents three offbeat news stories (that are not entertainment or sports-related), which are critiqued by the hosts. In "The Loser's Circle," featured on the Friday edition of the webcast (the Monday edition on the television broadcast) since February 2015, Levin, Latibeaudiere, and TMZ on TV executive producer Evan Rosenblum judge a clip from a TMZ videographer originally rejected by Levin for TMZ.com or for broadcast on TMZ on TV by post-production supervisor Chad Weiser following its initial pitch. "Tim's Rejects" and "Hate Mail" aired as the last segments of their respective editions until April 2015, when they were shifted to the block preceding that occupied by the "Viewer's Choice" segment (at which point, all three segments as well as "The Loser's Circle" began to be followed by a story segment).

In March 2012, Fox Television Stations tested a syndicated broadcast of TMZ Live (an hour-long edited version of the live webcast broadcast on a one-day delay from its original tape date, with segments aired in a different order, mainly due to live interviews that require the segment to be shown out of order on the webcast for various reasons) on its television stations in Los Angeles and Phoenix. In June 2012, SiriusXM Radio announced that the show would be aired daily on its Sirius XM Stars channel. In October of that year, the television show was expanded to seven markets, adding Boston, Chicago, Dallas, Detroit and Minneapolis. On September 9, 2013, TMZ Live began airing on all 18 Fox owned-and-operated stations. The program began to be syndicated to stations outside of the Fox Television Stations group in the spring of 2014.

=== TMZ on TV ===
On September 10, 2007, TMZ launched an accompanying television series, TMZ on TV. The syndicated television program airs Monday through Fridays.

In the United States, the show airs in various timeslots on stations of varying network affiliation (primarily on Fox stations), mainly either in early primetime or after late local newscasts, with an hour-long 'best-of' program compiling select stories from the weekday broadcasts airing on weekends. The show covers stories similar to those found on the website and TMZ Live, with the main difference being that TMZ on TV largely delivers its stories in a humorous manner whereas a mix of humorous and serious news stories appear on the website and companion web/television series. TMZ lets viewers see the two most recent episodes of the program on TMZ.com after the episode's original airdate (being available for viewing for two days after the broadcast on weekdays and three days after the original broadcast on weekends).

Chris Persell, of TVWeek.com, called the show a "complement [to] the website, with news updates added to later airings of the show". Levin and Jim Paratore served as executive producers to the show, and the on-air cast originally included Teresa Strasser, John Fugelsang, Ben Mankiewicz, and Michael Hundgen. David Bianculli of The New York Daily News strongly criticized the television show, its topics, and what he sees as its reporters' tactics and lack of professionalism.

=== Dax Chat ===
Dax Chat is a live chat program on Ustream hosted by TMZ clip clearance producer Dax Holt. In the broadcasts, Holt talks to "Chizzlers" about celebrity gossip and articles on the TMZ website.

=== TMZ Sports ===
As early as 2009, Levin was rumored to be interested in creating a TMZ-branded sports site. The site was initially expected to launch in March 2010 but those plans did not see fruition. It eventually launched as a branded section on the main TMZ website in June 2013. Premiere Networks launched a daily TMZ Sports radio show in October 2013. A television show began testmarketing on select regional Fox stations in January 2014. It then aired during the 2014/2015 seasons on Reelz under the name TMZ Hollywood Sports. On November 9, 2015, the series reverted to being known as TMZ Sports and moved to Fox Sports 1. TMZ Sports is co-hosted by TMZ Sports Executive Producer Michael Babcock, WNBA player Renee Montgomery, and former WWE Superstar and NFL player, Mojo Muhtadi.

=== TMZ France ===
TMZ France was created on December 18, 2012.

=== TMZ DC ===
In April 2026 TMZ launched a Washington DC bureau with a focus on coverage on U.S. lawmakers and political officials.

== Criticism ==
Since its launch, the TMZ website has faced criticism, varying from attempted boycotts to criticism of its journalistic tactics and its focus. It has been criticized for using photographs and videos obtained by paparazzi. Some have questioned the effect that aggressive and obtrusive photographers have on the subjects they cover. Many of the videos on the site show, in the footage, that their paparazzi chase people (mainly celebrities)—a practice that has been called dangerous and "creepy". Over the years, some have called for a boycott of TMZ and the accompanying show.

TMZ has also faced internal criticism due to Harvey Levin's support for Donald Trump in the run-up to the 2016 United States presidential election. By 2020, dozens of former TMZ employees had spoken to the media about a racist and misogynistic workplace culture that TMZ's internal leadership was unwilling to change.

=== Reporting of suicide details ===
After the July 2017 suicide of Linkin Park lead vocalist Chester Bennington, TMZ reported that he had attempted to drown himself nine months earlier. This information had been redacted from the Los Angeles County Coroner's report at the request of a lawyer representing Bennington's widow, Talinda, who responded with criticism of the Los Angeles County Coroner's office for disclosing the information to TMZ, and of TMZ itself. She concluded a Twitter tirade with the hashtag "#FuckyouTMZ".

In May 2018, TMZ reported intimate details of the April suicide of Swedish DJ Avicii with the headline "Avicii's suicide caused by self-inflicted cuts from glass". Jennifer Michael Hecht, writing for Vox, criticized TMZ's reporting as sensationalist and going against the CDC's recommended guidelines for reporting suicides, which include not mentioning the method of suicide. Talinda Bennington also reacted unfavorably, urging people not to "click on the TMZ article or any other about the private details of Avicii's passing", adding, "This is how [we] can stop [filthy TMZ]."

=== Stolen Indiana Jones items ===
TMZ faced strong criticism for purchasing stolen items pertaining to Indiana Jones and the Kingdom of the Crystal Skull. On October 2, 2007, IESB reported that a number of production photos and sensitive documents pertaining to the production budget had been stolen from Steven Spielberg's production office.

Movie City News, which strongly criticized TMZ for purchasing stolen items, remarked that the then-new website "wasn't getting off to a good start". According to IESB, TMZ had obtained some of the stolen property and was planning on running a story about the topic on its TV show, until the lawyers of the film's production company, Paramount Pictures, intervened. Shortly after IESB broke the story, TMZ broadcast details about the Indiana Jones production budget on its show on October 3, 2007.

=== Story-gathering tactics ===
Tony Manfred of The Cornell Daily Sun criticized TMZ in a September 2007 article titled "I Want My TMZ", calling TMZ "a fusion of celebrity news blog and embarrassing video archive" and saying he felt the website had become "the poster child for the celebrity pseudo-news industry" and that the site has "distinct advantages" over "gossip magazines" because it can "show all the borderline pornographic clips that Entertainment Tonight and Access Hollywood can't."

Jennifer Metz and David Muir of ABC News acknowledged that TMZ has long been criticized for its "aggressive tactics, antagonizing stars with video cameras" and noted that those "encounters, capturing at times violent celebrity confrontations with photographers, receive hundreds of hits online, and critics ask if entertainment reporters are crossing the line." Metz and Muir questioned whether TMZ's tactics "go too far".

Ken Sunshine, publicist for Ben Affleck and Leonardo DiCaprio, said his clients disliked the website because of its tendency to be critical of celebrities. "I hate that they have anything to do with trying to put celebrities into the worst light possible and that they play the 'gotcha' game". A student newspaper criticized TMZ for having personality cults for figures such as Lindsay Lohan and Paris Hilton—celebrities better known as targets for paparazzi than for the work they do. In defense of TMZ's coverage, Levin said that certain celebrities are main subjects on the website because of their "relevancy" and because their relevancy helps draw viewership to the website. Liz Kelly of Washington Post attacked both Levin and TMZ in an article, writing: "I know this is like spitting in the wind, but I have to say it: Harvey Levin, please stop it."

=== Murder of Andre Lowe ===
On January 13, 2013, Andre Lowe was killed outside a Hollywood nightclub. A nearby TMZ reporter filmed the attack and it was posted to the website without Lowe's family's permission. On January 22, TMZ took the video down after over two dozen advertisers revoked ads for the website.

=== Death of Kobe Bryant ===
At 11:24 a.m. Pacific Time on January 26, 2020, TMZ reported on the death of basketball player Kobe Bryant, the first news outlet to do so. TMZ received strong criticism, notably from Sheriff Alex Villanueva of the Los Angeles County Sheriff's Department, for reporting the story before the next of kin had been notified as well as leaking photos of the crash site.

=== Johnny Depp Vs. Amber Heard ===
During the defamation trial against actress Amber Heard, TMZ was a point of discussion. Lawyer Camille Vasquez, representing Depp, said Heard gave TMZ a video of Johnny Depp being agitated and slamming cupboards a day before the temporary restraining order (TRO) was filed. Vasquez also pointed out that TMZ had been alerted of the alleged abuse and the upcoming divorce in 2016. Heard said in her deposition that TMZ had been alerted. On May 24, 2022, TMZ, through EHM Productions Inc, filed an Emergency Motion to prevent a former employee from testifying in the case. The motion was denied and Morgan Tremaine, the former TMZ employee, gave testimony.

=== Death of Liam Payne ===
On October 16, 2024, after the death of English singer and former One Direction member Liam Payne, TMZ drew controversy for posting pictures of the identifying tattoos on his dead body as well as the scene of the hotel in Buenos Aires, Argentina. This sparked outrage on social media, including from Canadian singer Alessia Cara and English media personality Rylan Clark. The photos were taken down after the backlash.

=== Assassination of Charlie Kirk ===
On September 10, 2025, loud cheering and clapping could be heard in the TMZ newsroom during a live report about the shooting of Charlie Kirk, seconds before Harvey Levin announced that Kirk had died. Clips were widely shared on social media and TMZ was heavily criticized. TMZ later apologized for the "tone deaf laughter" but said the employees were watching a car chase, not reacting to Kirk's death.

=== False news ===
==== John F. Kennedy ====
In what The Smoking Gun called "a colossal screw-up", in 2009 TMZ published an "exclusive" picture on their website of a man purported to be John F. Kennedy on a ship with several naked women that could have "changed history" had it come out during his presidential campaign. Despite having a Photoshop expert proclaim the picture "authentic", it was later found not to have been of Kennedy. It was part of a 1967 Playboy photoshoot, Playboy representatives confirmed.

==== Lil Wayne ====
On March 15, 2013, members of TMZ's staff claimed that they had learned rapper Lil Wayne was in "unstable" condition after being hospitalized following a seizure and that the then 30-year-old rapper had been placed in an induced coma and was breathing through tubes. Soon afterward, Birdman wrote on his Twitter account that Wayne was healthy enough to be released from the hospital. Approximately one hour after these messages were posted, Wayne himself tweeted that he was fine.

==== Jerry Lee Lewis ====
On October 26, 2022, TMZ incorrectly reported that rock n' roll and country musician Jerry Lee Lewis had died; it issued a correction a few hours later. A CBS affiliate in Sacramento also reported the false news. Lewis died two days later.

==== Beyoncé at DNC ====
On August 22, 2024, TMZ incorrectly reported that Beyoncé would appear on the final night of the 2024 Democratic National Convention. The report was widely shared. Later that night, a representative for Beyoncé said she had never been scheduled to be at the DNC and that the report was false. After the convention, TMZ acknowledged "we got this one wrong" and was widely mocked on social media.
