= Brad Fitzpatrick =

American programmer and creator of LiveJournal

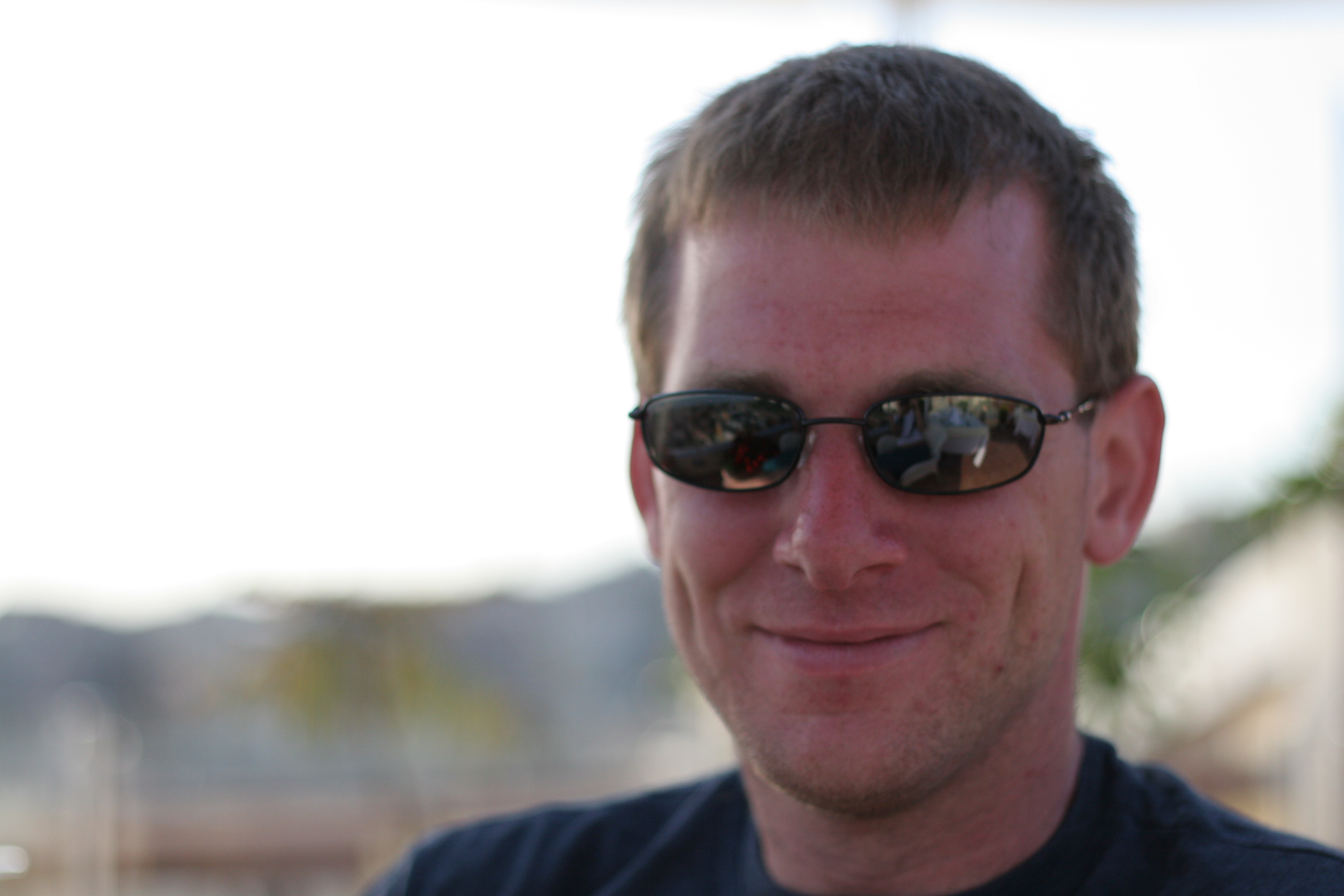
- Fitzpatrick in 2011
- Born: Bradley Joseph Fitzpatrick; February 5, 1980 (age 46); Iowa, United States
- Education: University of Washington
- Occupation: Programmer
- Spouse: Kate Fitzpatrick
- Children: 3
- Website: bradfitz.com

Bradley Joseph Fitzpatrick (born February 5, 1980) is an American programmer. He is best known as the creator of LiveJournal and is the author of a variety of free software projects such as memcached, WebSub, OpenID, and Perkeep.

== Personal life ==
Born in Iowa, Fitzpatrick grew up in Beaverton, Oregon where he attended Aloha High School, and majored in computer science at the University of Washington in Seattle. He started his first company, FreeVote.com, while in high school.

Fitzpatrick is married to Kate Fitzpatrick. They have three children.

== Career ==
Brad Fitzpatrick in 2006

LiveJournal grew out of a journaling program Fitzpatrick wrote for himself as a college freshman. It eventually became a full-time job and then a company; in January 2005, he sold it and its parent company, Danga Interactive, to Six Apart, for an undisclosed sum of cash and stock. He was named chief architect of Six Apart. He left Six Apart in August 2007, moving to Google, and in 2008, after the sale of LiveJournal to SUP Media, joined the LiveJournal Advisory Board. In June 2010, the board was dissolved, ending his involvement with LiveJournal. At Google he was a Staff Software Engineer and was part of the Go programming language team.

In January 2020, Fitzpatrick announced he was leaving Google. Three days later he joined Tailscale as a late-stage co-founder.

== Honors ==
In June 2014, the University of Washington School of Computer Science and Engineering gave Fitzpatrick an award for Early Career Achievement.
