= Oh No They Didn't =

Gossip community on LiveJournal

- ONTD posts on August 25, 2010
- Website type: Collaborative blog
- Available in: English
- Website: ohnotheydidnt.livejournal.com
- Commercial: Yes
- Registration: Moderated, required to post content
- Launched: June 26, 2004

Oh No They Didn't, also known as ONTD, is the largest community on LiveJournal with over 100,000 members. The community focuses on celebrity gossip and pop culture with most of its posts aggregated from other gossip blogs. The site formed a partnership with pop culture blog network Buzz Media in July 2010 that was not renewed a year later.

The blog boasted over 300,000 page views daily according to a 2008 Popmatters article, although it has considerably decreased in recent years. When LiveJournal increased the comment limit on posts from 5000 to 10,000 comments, ONTD contained the first post to reach this new limit.

== Origins ==
The community was originally created in 2004 by teenagers Erin Lang, Bri Draffen and Breniecia Reuben.

== Editorial style ==
The community published an average of 100 member posts per day, with most posts getting between 100 and 500 comments on average. The community moderators post a weekly post called "Free for All Friday" (or "FFAF") which allows members to post off-topic comments. These free-for-all posts have often been expanded to include community discussion posts for important pop culture events such as the Academy Awards, the Olympics (known as "Free for All Olympics" or "FFAO" posts) and Saturday Night Live viewing posts.

In addition to members submitting the posts themselves, ONTD relies heavily on user participation in the comments section, where members can express their opinions on posts. Members often illustrate their reaction to a particular news item by posting an animated GIF image which represents their feelings. After the death of Michael Jackson on June 25, 2009, according to MSNBC, "users expressed their collective grief by posting a Fantasia Barrino GIF, in which the American Idol star wails and flails her arms wildly," while other users expressed concern over the continued use of a popular GIF taken from the music video "Thriller" featuring a scene of Jackson eating popcorn, an image that is frequently posted on the community in anticipation of a controversial or "flame-worthy topic."

== Awards and recognition ==
ONTD won the Best Gossip Blog award in the 2008 Weblog Awards, beating out other popular celebrity blogs such as D-Listed, Perez Hilton and TMZ, with a whopping 44% of the vote.

ONTD has been noted in O, the Oprah Magazine, cited in Life & Style, and artist Lily Allen referenced the online community in the March 2009 issue of Playboy Magazine.

The Swedish newspaper Metro described the community as "Gossip on steroids." The paper also noted that with a high volume of posts, the reader would "find a lot of highlights, and often before newspapers get their hands on it". The San Francisco Chronicle wrote that the "scandal-mongering community overflows with interactive snark" and encouraged the reader to "imagine a gossip clearinghouse run by teenagers with bad attitudes and sharp tongues". The A.V. Club cited ONTD as a "favorite time-wasting website" and wrote that "the comments section can sometimes be more amusing than the posts themselves". In December 2009, the users of ONTD were derisively referred to as "jackals" because the stories posted on the blog are taken from other sources. In response, the users embraced the term and repeatedly used the term in later posts, as well as manipulating their icons to include photographs of the animals.

The Village Voice called the community a "psychopathic celebrity news/gossip wire-of-sorts" and its users "a community of pathologically obsessive celebrity gossip sadomasochists."

== Exclusives ==
ONTD was the first community to break the news of Jamie Lynn Spears' pregnancy, after leaking OK! Magazine's unpublished front page cover, and was the first to report that Kirk Acevedo had announced via his Facebook status update that he had been fired from the Fox drama, Fringe.

When the rumors of Jon from Jon and Kate Gosselin's infidelity started appearing in February 2009, a photo of Jon out on town was posted on ONTD, which showed him posing with two young women in a local bar. National gossip magazines picked up the news, and a screen grab of ONTD could be seen in Star and US Weekly.

The most scandalous and notable events are often given nicknames to distinguish them in future posts, such as the January 2008 hospitalization of Britney Spears, which was dubbed Hostage Brituation '08 by the community's members. This nickname was later picked up and used by Rolling Stone. The abuse case between singers Rihanna and Chris Brown was dubbed Domestic Disturbia '09 by the community's members, and the community was also credited with starting a meme ("Gokey is a douche") connected to some friends of American Idol contestant Danny Gokey's negative comments and pictures regarding fellow contestant Adam Lambert. The forced removal of "#gokeyisadouche" from Twitter's trending topics list prompted a discussion on Twitter's censorship.

The community was also responsible for a hoax that claimed actress Betty White had died. After a post titled "Renner, Just Happy to Be Here" was approved to the community, the original poster edited the post to show a screen grab of a TMZ article claiming White had died. Users displayed shock and confusion, before slowly realizing the article was a fake when not only did the source link just go to TMZ's main website, but the article mentioned "possibilities of foul play and drug abuse, and grandchildren that Betty White does not have." Community moderators deleted the post within 40 minutes, but not before "Betty White" became a Twitter trending topic. Once the hoax was discovered, fans urged each other to tweet #BettyWhiteFacts and other positive messages about White instead of spreading further death rumours.

Another notable hoax involved a fake Twitter screenshot of Michael Lohan saying his daughter Lindsay Lohan had an affair with Tommy Mottola when she was 17, and that she had HIV. Though the post was quickly deleted, Perez Hilton reported on the screenshot as if it were true and other gossip sites followed. Michael believed that the screenshot was real and that someone had hacked his Twitter account, while Lindsay refused to believe her father was innocent, stating "He's a grown man and has done the exact same things on TV/interviews, why wouldn't he lie on Twitter, and everywhere else!" The moderators of ONTD later apologized for the scandal, while stating that they were "pretty appalled to learn that NONE of the other gossip or news sites that posted the story bothered to check for accuracy and have yet to post a retraction or apology for spreading such a vicious rumor."

== LiveJournal downtime ==
In January 2009, ONTD became the first LiveJournal community to surpass 16,777,216 (2^{24}) comments. This exceeded LiveJournal's previously unknown limit on comments. This resulted in almost a week of downtime for the community, while LiveJournal worked to fix the issue. A second community, ontd, was created and members posted and commented there until the issue was fixed.

Oh No They Didn't was briefly suspended due to an explosion in usage following the death of Michael Jackson on June 25, 2009. The amount of traffic the community received brought all of LiveJournal's servers down, resulting in downtime for the entire domain. During this time, members migrated temporarily to ontd once again.

On January 18, 2012, Oh No They Didn't blacked out for 12 hours, in protest of SOPA. The decision was left up to the users, who voted in support of the site's blackout.

== Notable members ==
Former members:

- Franchesca Ramsey
- Noël Wells
- Tyler Oakley
- Cara Cunningham
