= Ilya Oskolkov-Tsentsiper =

Russian social designer and entrepreneur (born 1967)

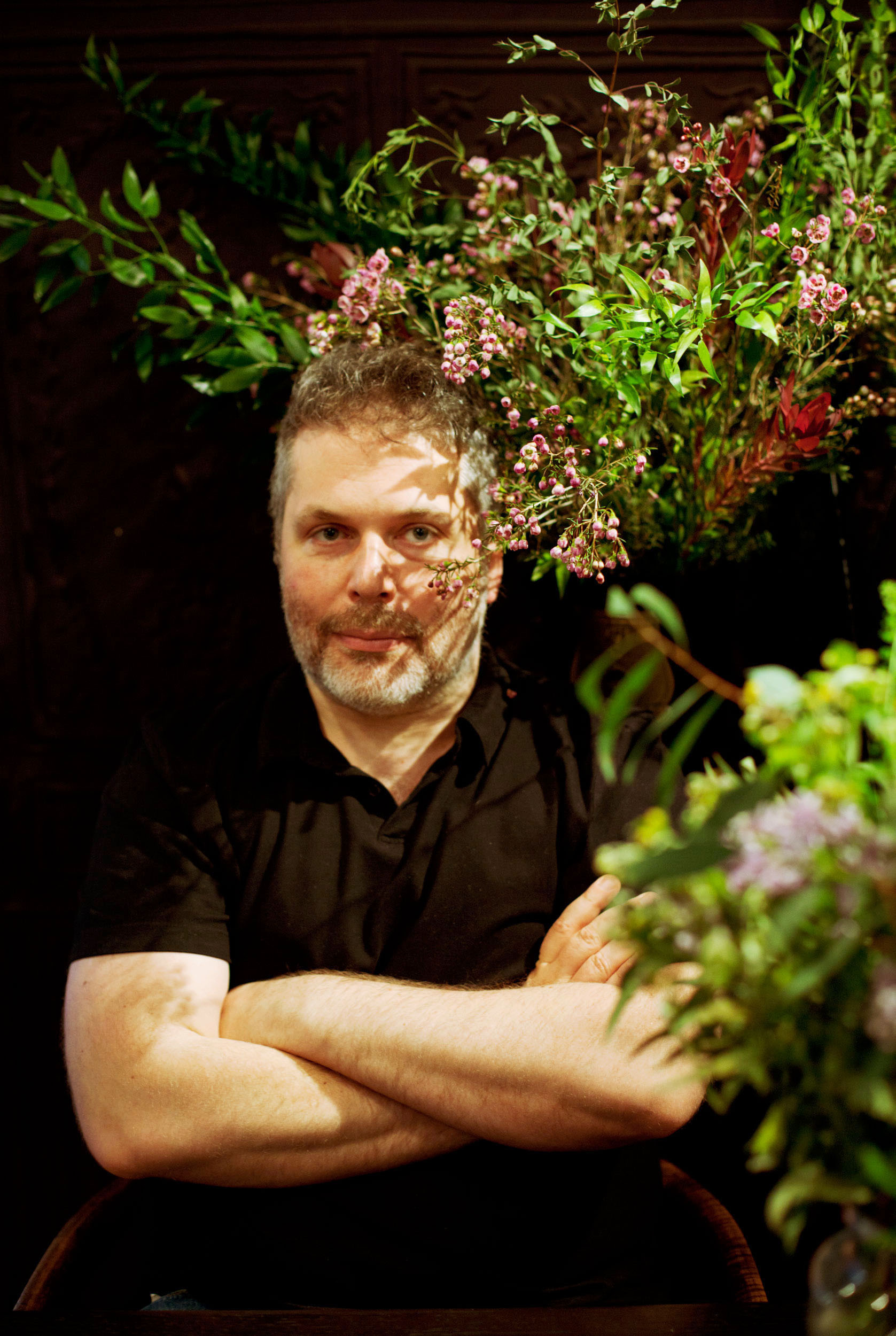
- Oskolkov-Tsentsiper April 2014
- Born: Moscow, Soviet Union
- Occupations: Social designer and entrepreneur
- Children: 1

Ilya Vladimirovich Oskolkov-Tsentsiper (born 30 September 1967, Moscow, USSR) is a Russian social designer, media manager, entrepreneur and inventor. He cofounded Afisha magazine and was president of the Strelka Institute for Media, Architecture and Design. He works and lives in Tel-Aviv.

In 1989 Oskolkov-Tsentsiper graduated in theatre history from the Lunacharsky State Institute for Theatre Arts Moscow (GITIS), today RATI, after which he completed a post-graduate course at the Cultural Politics Department, Université de Bourgogne, Dijon, France.

== ART ==
From 1989 to 1991, Ilya Oskolkov-Tsentsiper managed the sociological department at the Union of Artists of the USSR and worked as an art critic for Ogoniok magazine which achieved a record circulation of 4.6 million copies.

In 1990, together with a team of partners he set up ART-MIF (Moscow International Fair), the first international art fair in the Soviet Union, which ran for five years and held dozens of modern art exhibitions.

== Media ==
=== Matador Magazine ===
In 1993, Oskolkov-Tsentsiper was a leading member of the team that founded Matador Magazine, which popularized the new trend of Russian “intellectual glamour” featuring film, music, art, fashion and culture news.

=== Afisha ===
In April 1999, Oskolkov-Tsentsiper teamed up with Andrew Paulson and Anton Kudryashov to found the highly influential Afisha magazine. Afisha had a profound effect on Moscow's cultural and nightlife scene and broke new ground with its mix of informed commentary, listings and reviews.

Oskolkov-Tsentsiper brought together a team of young journalists, designers and photographers to create a unique Afisha style which had a major impact on Russian media. Many high-profile Russian artists made their first public appearances on Afisha's front cover and the magazine popularised several new fashion trends – even introducing numerous new words into the Russian lexicon, from “deadline” to “hipster”.

Afisha remains Russia's most popular lifestyle media brand with a monthly Internet audience of more than 4.5 million.

While at Afisha Oskolkov-Tsentsiper also launched and managed such publications as Afisha-Mir, a glossy monthly travel magazine, Bolshoy Gorod, a city magazine, Afisha-Yeda, a cookery magazine and a series of Afisha guidebooks on various cities and countries.

== Moscow city projects ==
=== Afisha Picnic ===
In 2004, Oskolkov-Tsentsiper launched Afisha Picnic, an annual open-air festival which has grown into Russia's largest music festival. Along with music, Afisha Picnic introduces its guests to modern art and street culture, and operates as a “hipster fashion” barometer. Such stars as Zemfira, Madness, Mujuice, Beirut, Petr Nalitch, Leningrad, Auktsyon, Mumiy Troll, Pompeya, Cops on Fire, Tesla Boy, Aquarium, Franz Ferdinand, Pet Shop Boys, Zhanna Aguzarova, Spleen and Blur appeared on the festival's stage over different years.

=== Strelka Institute ===
In 2009, Ilya Oskolkov-Tsentsiper founded the Strelka Institute for Media, Architecture and Design, a non-profit postgraduate education institution. The institute is located on the premises of the former Krasny Oktyabr factory in the city's center. Its first curator was Rem Koolhaas, a Dutch architect and winner of the Pritzker Prize.

Strelka runs an open air program which includes public lectures delivered by leading architects, designers and thinkers as well as conferences, workshops, concerts and festivals.

Strelka's commercial program involves architectural competitions, such as the renovation of Gorky Park, Zaryadye and Polytechnic Museum, and develops urban solutions for Russian private and municipal customers.

The institute also runs Moscow's popular and Bar Strelka.Strelka has been credited with reviving interest in urban development and design and bringing some of the world's leading architects to Moscow.

=== VDNKh ===
In summer 2014, Oskolkov-Tsentsiper headed project team affiliated with VDNKh direction which aims to redevelop the territory. Yuri Saprykine, former managing editor of Afisha-Rambler, has joined the team.

== Business ==
=== Afisha Publishing House ===
From 2007 to 2009, Oskolkov-Tsentsiper was general director at Afisha media holding company, which was part of Profmedia.

=== Yota ===
From 2010 to 2012, he worked as Vice President of Russian mobile broadband operator Yota Group and was responsible for strategic communications, brand development, new services and Yota's office in London.

=== Winter ===
In 2011, Oskolkov-Tsentsiper co-founded Winter, a design and communications consultancy based in London. Winter specializes in offering branding, marketing and design services to Russian companies. In December 2012, Winter and The Apostol, a Russian center for strategic communications, developed a new brand image for state-owned corporation Rostekhnologii, rebranding it as Rostec.

=== Tsentsiper ===
In 2014, Oskolkov-Tsentsiper founded self-named company with interdisciplinary team which has to do with service design, product design, urban design and planning, web development. Today the company develops several complex projects for the Russian Post (with 41 901 subbranches and more than 350 000 employees), Sberbank (state-owned largest bank chain in Russia), PIK Group - the largest real estate and home-builder company in Russia.

=== Sdelano ===
In 2015, Oskolkov-Tsentsiper co-founded Sdelano, a renovation service in-a-box service providing apartment renovation for fixed price and in fixed dates. Sdelano operates in Moscow and the Moscow region.

== Family ==
Divorced, has a son named Matvey. and daughter, Mira.
