= LiveJournal =

Russian social networking service

- LiveJournal homepage
- Website type: Blog hosting
- Available in: 33 languages
- Owner: Rambler Media Group
- Creator: Brad Fitzpatrick
- Website: livejournal.com
- Commercial: Yes
- Registration: Optional (required to post)
- Launched: April 15, 1999; 27 years ago
- Current status: Online
- Written in: Perl

LiveJournal (Russian: Живой Журнал or ЖЖ), formerly stylised as LiVEJOURNAL, is a Russian-owned social networking service where users can keep a blog, journal, or diary. American programmer Brad Fitzpatrick started LiveJournal on April 15, 1999, as a way of keeping his high school friends updated on his activities. In January 2005, American blogging software company Six Apart purchased Danga Interactive, the company that operated LiveJournal, from Fitzpatrick.

Six Apart sold LiveJournal to Russian media company SUP Media in 2007; the service continued to operate out of the U.S. via a California-based subsidiary, LiveJournal, Inc., but began moving some operations to Russian offices in 2009. In December 2016, the service relocated its servers to Russia, and in April 2017, LiveJournal changed its terms of service to conform to Russian law. As with other social networks, a wide variety of public figures use the service, as do political pundits, who use it for political commentary, particularly in Russia, where it partners with the online newspaper Gazeta.ru.

== Features ==
The unit of social networking on LiveJournal is quaternary (with four possible states of connection between one user and another). Two users can have no relationship, they can list each other as friends mutually, or either can "friend" the other without reciprocation.

The term "friend" on LiveJournal is mostly a technical term, but because it is emotionally loaded for many people, there have been discussions in such LiveJournal communities as lj_dev and lj_biz as well as suggestions about whether the term should be used this way.

A user's list of friends (friends list, often shortened to flist) will often include several communities and RSS feeds in addition to individual users. Generally, "friending" allows a user's friends to read protected entries and causes the friends' entries to appear on the user's "friends page". Friends can also be grouped together in "friends groups", allowing for more complex behavior.

Features common to all accounts

- Each journal entry has its own web page, which includes the comments left by other users. In addition, each user has a journal page, which shows all of their most recent journal entries, along with links to the comment pages.
- The most distinctive feature of LiveJournal is the "friends list", which gives the site a strong social aspect in addition to the blog services. The friends list provides various syndication and privacy services, described below. Each user has a friends page, which collects the most recent journal entries of the people on their friends list.
- LiveJournal allows users to customize their accounts. The S2 programming language allows journal templates to be modified by members. Users may upload graphical avatars, or "userpics", which appear next to the username in prominent areas as on an Internet forum. Paid account holders are given full access to S2 management and more userpics, as well as other features.
- Each user also has a "User Info" page, which contains a variety of data including contact information, a biography, images (linked from off-site sources) and lists of friends, interests, communities and even schools the user has attended in the past or is currently attending.
- LiveJournal has five account levels: basic (comprising approximately 95% of the network); plus (sponsored with more advertising); "early adopters" who were registered prior to 14 September 2000; paid; and permanent. Permanent accounts are normally not available to the average user; there have been occasional sale days or special offers, but such sales are not guaranteed in the future. Before March 12, 2008, basic accounts were ad-free; in August 2008, LiveJournal resumed new basic account creation but changed that account level to display ads to non-logged-in readers. Basic users also see advertising, but not on other basic journals.
- As well as allowing embedded videos from other sites, LiveJournal can host videos and allows users who have enabled the updated site design to post links to the hosted videos.

Paid account features

- Sending Text Messages – users can receive text messages sent via LiveJournal without sharing their phone number. If the text messaging feature is set up, anyone (or any authorized user) can use LiveJournal to send text messages to their cellphone by following a link on the User Info page.
- "To-do list" feature – LiveJournal offers "to-do lists" for managing users goals and aims. Users can have 150 to-do list items. Each to-do list item must have a subject, priority, details and descriptions, status, percent done, due date and categories field.
- "Express Lane" – users with paid accounts have access to express lanes that make pages load faster. When logged into their Paid or Permanent Account during times of heavy site load, their requests for pages are sent to the web servers before other users' requests.
- "Voice Post" – members with paid accounts can call from any phone to a specific number, record the audio and upload it directly to their journal.
- "Extra storage space" – lets users store more Scrapbook photos and voice posts. Photos and voice posts that have been uploaded there are easy to include in the log entry.

== Community ==
=== User interaction ===
As of 2014, LiveJournal in the United States had 10 million monthly uniques, 30 million monthly visitors, and 170 million pageviews. As with most weblogs, people can comment on each other's journal entries and create a message board-style thread of comments – each comment can be replied to individually, starting a new thread. All users, including non-paying users, can set various options for comments: they can instruct the software to only accept comments from those on their friends list or block anonymous comments (meaning only LiveJournal users can comment on their posts). They can also screen various types of comments before they are displayed, or disable commenting entirely. Users can also have replies sent directly to their registered e-mail address.

In addition, LiveJournal acts as host to group journals, dubbed "communities" (frequently abbreviated as comms). Anyone who joins a community can make posts to it as they would on a regular journal; communities also have "maintainers", ordinary users who run the community and oversee membership and moderation.

=== LiveJournal community ===
LiveJournal community is a collective blog in which different users can post messages. Users who are interested in a particular subject can find or create a community for this subject. All the users of the communities are divided into:

- Owners who are supervising the community and capable to use all administrative functions that are available for managing the community.
- Maintainers usually use their own user accounts to supervise a community, control its settings and Community Info, perform some administrative functions.
- Moderators can approve or reject messages left by participants, add existing records label or tags, approve requests to join a community, hide and freeze comments.
- Members can see the community's members-only entries. For Communities with fewer than 500 members, the entire Members list will be displayed on a Community Info page.
- Watchers can assign permissions, allow entry into the community, delete posts (messages) or hide comments on posts.

=== Contributors ===
Some areas of LiveJournal rely heavily on user contributions and volunteer efforts. In particular, the LiveJournal Support area is run almost entirely by unpaid volunteers. Similarly, the website is translated into other languages by volunteers, although this effort is running down due to a perceived lack of involvement from the LiveJournal administration.

The development of the LiveJournal software has seen extensive volunteer involvement in the past. In February and March 2003, there was an effort, nicknamed the Bazaar, to boost volunteer performance by offering money in return for "wanted" enhancements or improvements. The Bazaar was intended to follow a regular monthly pay-out scheme, but it ended up paying out only once, after which it was neglected by the management, and shut down one year later.

Nowadays, voluntary contributions to the software are considered for inclusion less and less as the company has acquired more and more paid employees who focus on the organization's commercial interests. This has led to the formation of several forks, many of which introduce new features that users would like to see, especially features that are brought up repeatedly in LiveJournal's own suggestions journal.

=== Demographics ===
As of November 2012, 39,663,771 accounts exist on LiveJournal, with 1,790,795 listed as "active in some way." Of those users who provided their date of birth, the majority were in the 17–25 age group, with an exceptionally large group of 32-year-olds. Among the users specifying their gender in their profile, 45% of those accounts identified as male, and 55% as female. One fifth, or 20%, of accounts did not specify a gender.

LiveJournal is most popular in English-speaking countries (although there is a language selection feature), and the United States has by far the most LiveJournal users among users who choose to list a location. There is also a sizable Russian contingent. LiveJournal is the largest online community on the Runet, with about 45% of all entries in the Russian blogosphere.

=== Mascot: Frank the Goat ===
Frank the Goat is LiveJournal's mascot. During the early years of the site, Frank was treated like an actual living being by much of the LiveJournal userbase, and his brief "biography" as well as his "journal" reflect this.

Sometimes, callers to LiveJournal's Voice Post service are informed "Frank the Goat appreciates your call." This occurs randomly.

A weekly comic about Frank, written and drawn by cartoonist Ryan Estrada, was updated every Thursday on the "Frank: The Comic Strip" community on LiveJournal. As of July 2009 the community had roughly 8,000 members, and was watched by more than 7,000 LiveJournal users.

Beginning at the end of January 2010, LiveJournal's weekly news posts included references to Frank's life, becoming works of short fiction at the end of February. These pieces are often tied to weekly virtual gift promotions, where commenters that meet a certain criterion will receive a free v-gift sent by Frank.

== Content ==
=== Privacy ===
LiveJournal provides an option intended to reduce the chances of search engines indexing a journal; however, the only way to make it completely impossible for such indexing to occur is to set the entry security to "friends only" or higher when first posting the entry. If an entry is first posted publicly, and then edited to reflect a higher security level, it may have already been indexed by a search engine in the time between the security edit. The popular "friends only" security option, which has since been adopted by Xanga and Myspace, hides a post from the general public so that only those on the user's friends list can read it. Some users keep all their posts friends-only (except for a single post explaining that the journal is friends-only). Still, such features as tags and userpics cannot be hidden. LiveJournal also allows users to create custom user groups within their group of friends to further restrict who can read any particular post, and to allow reading of subsets of a user's friends list.

LiveJournal additionally has a "private" security option which allows users to make a post that only the poster can read, thus making their LiveJournal a private diary rather than a blog. It is also possible to choose a default security setting for one's journal, so that all entries are posted at that security level by default even if one forgets to alter the security setting at the time of posting.

Users may restrict who can comment on their posts in addition to who has the ability to read their posts. Comments on a given entry may be allowed from anyone who can read the entry or restricted. Commenting may be restricted by disabling commenting altogether or by screening comments. Screened comments are visible only to the original posters until the journal owner approves the comment. These restrictions can be applied to just anonymous users, users who aren't listed as a friend, or everyone. The IP address of commenters can be logged as well if the journal owner wishes to enable it.

An option allows users to hide their "friend of" list from public view, but leaves the list visible to the user. In this case, only the friends list is shown. When "friend of" is allowed, journal accounts who have friended the user and who are also friended are listed in neither "friend of" nor 'friend", but rather a third category, "mutual friends". This was eventually made a separate option, like the "friend of" list, and reworded so that the lists would have to be selected to include them in a profile, rather than to select an option to remove them.

LiveJournal lists that users can hide communities from their profile page by not friending them (friended communities are "watched") and by either banning the community from posting in their journal (which has no effect since they cannot anyway, but does remove them from the "member of" list) or by removing the "friend of" list, which removes the "member of" list in addition to the "friend of" list.

LiveJournal allows paid account users to change privacy settings on past entries in bulk. Basic and plus accounts do not have an official web-based method, and normally must manually change such settings one by one; some third party clients, such as Livejournal Visibility Changer, provide this functionality for non-paid users.

Communities can also be private, with moderated or closed membership, when community holders give users different level of access to the content, based on the information about the user.

=== Adult content ===
While LiveJournal permits adult-oriented content, it is a user's responsibility to mark content as inappropriate for minors. There are two types of adult content:

- Adult concepts: This rating applies to content that is not explicitly graphic, but may contain things that are of a mature nature and could be inappropriate for anyone under the age of 14 years.
- Explicit adult: This rating applies to graphic and explicit content (depicting nudity, sexuality, violence in images and language) that is appropriate only for adults, and is not suitable for viewers under the age of 18 years.

Labeling as adult material does not convey in any way that this content is considered obscene, in the legal definition of the term. Such content should be marked in order to be shown only to users whose birth dates on their user information page indicate that they are over the age of 18. At the same time the user itself can set own preferences in viewing adult content settings in order not to receive such materials. All users are defaulted to Moderate Filtering in the Safe Search Filter, but can change this option.

It is written in the LiveJournal rules that if the content is reported as being offensive or inappropriate, LiveJournal has the right to flag, restrict access, or delete it at any time without notice.

== Notable LiveJournals and users ==
Oh No They Didn't, also known as ONTD, was a popular community on LiveJournal in the late 2000s, with over 100,000 members. The community's primary interest was celebrity gossip, and most of its posts are taken and sourced from other gossip blogs. At the end of January 2009, Oh No They Didn't! was the first LiveJournal to surpass 16,777,216 comments (2^{24}), effectively breaking LiveJournal's previously undocumented limit on comments. This resulted in almost a week of downtime for the community, while LiveJournal worked to fix the issue.

In April 2010, the Oh No They Didn't community was moved to its own database cluster to improve site performance for all users, due to its size and the amount of traffic it was receiving.

== History ==
=== Founding and eventual sale to Six Apart ===
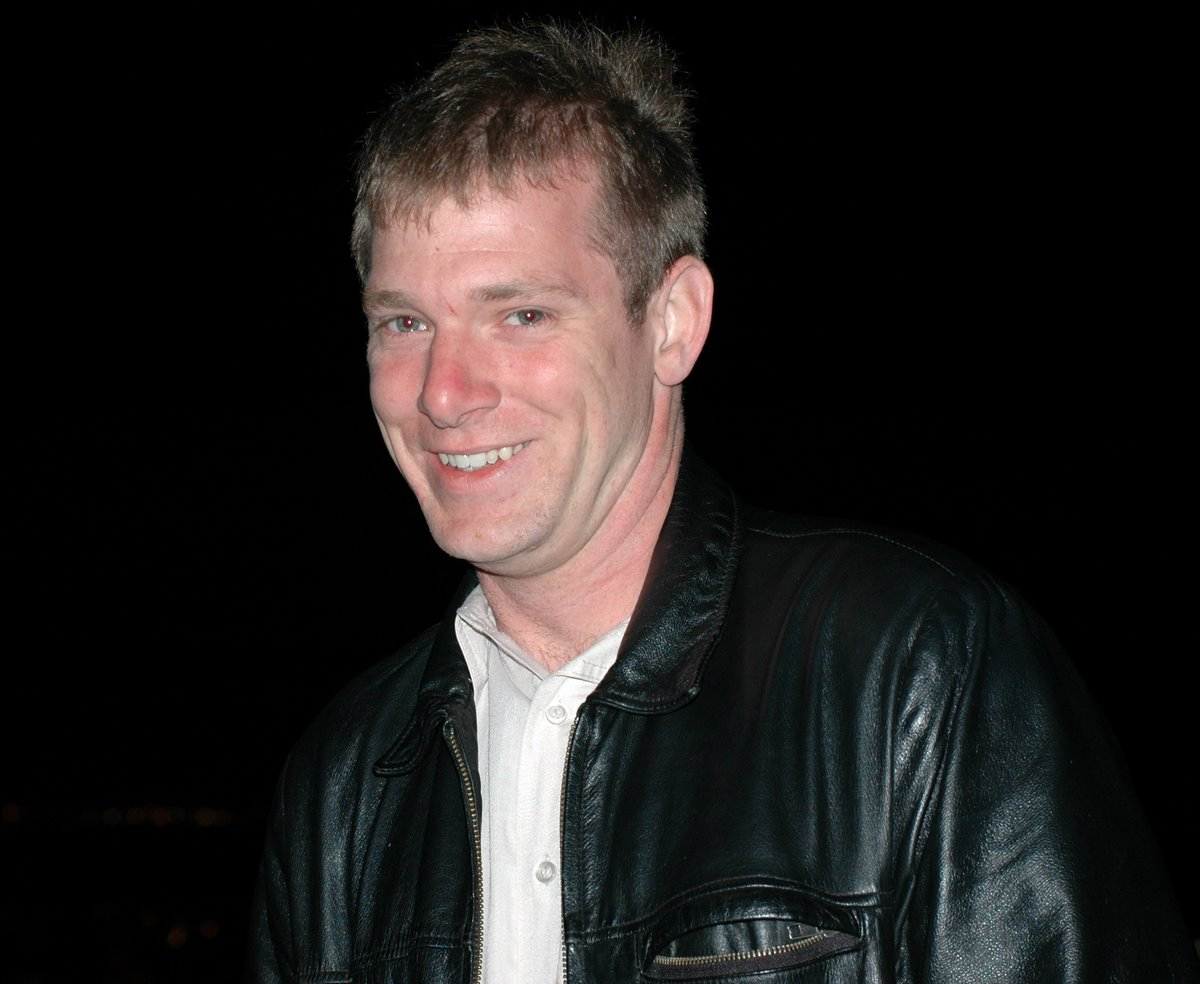
Brad Fitzpatrick

LiveJournal's parent company, Danga Interactive, was formed and held entirely by Brad Fitzpatrick. He sold the company to Six Apart in 2005. Rumors of the impending sale were first reported by Business 2.0 journalist Om Malik in January, 2005. Fitzpatrick confirmed the sale, and insisted the site's core principles would not be discarded by the new ownership.

In August 2007, Fitzpatrick left to work for Google. He continued to serve on the advisory board of LiveJournal, Inc until it was retired in June 2010.

=== Sale to SUP Media ===
LiveJournal became extremely popular in Russia. The Russian translation of LiveJournal – ЖЖ (ZheZhe, which stands for Живой Журнал) – has become a genericized trademark for blogging in Russia, and the community boasts approximately 700,000 Russian LiveJournals, with 300,000 of them being active.

Six Apart licensed the LiveJournal brand to the Russian company SUP Media in August 2006. The deal was brokered with Fitzpatrick's assistance, but expatriated Russians have expressed concerns, citing links between the company and state security. Some have also worried that SUP's purchase of the community was less to make a profit and more to curtail or even dissolve the strong independent Russian blogging community, silencing dissent the government found inconvenient. These concerns started with the licensing deal, and have grown with the announcement of LiveJournal's sale to SUP Media in December 2007.

In a March 2008 interview, Anton Nosik, an advisor to SUP Media, accused LiveJournal users of "trying to scare and blackmail us, threatening to destroy our business," and said that a large class of users are on LiveJournal only to harm it and its owners; "their goal is to criticize, destabilize and ruin our reputation." Nosik said his likely reaction to such pressure would be to retaliate against the users rather than bowing to their pressure.

Despite stating that LiveJournal would maintain the majority of its operations in the United States via the local subsidiary LiveJournal, Inc., in January 2009 SUP laid off some employees and moved product development and design functions to Russia. In December 2016, LiveJournal moved to servers hosted in Russia; in April 2017, it changed its terms of service to conform to Russian law and to be written (in their official form) only in Russian.

== Controversies and criticism ==
=== Invite system ===
From September 2, 2001, until December 12, 2003, the growth of LiveJournal was checked by an "invite code" system. This curbing of membership was necessitated by a rate of growth faster than the server architecture could handle. New users were required to either obtain an invite code from an existing user or buy a paid account (which reverted to a free account at the expiration of the period of time paid for). The invite code system serendipitously reduced abuse on the site by deterring people from creating multiple throw-away accounts. The invite code system was lifted after a number of major improvements to the overall site architecture.

Elimination of the invite code system was met with mixed feelings and some opposition. LiveJournal's management pointed out that the invite code system had always been intended to be temporary.

=== The word "friend" ===
The dual usage of "friends" as those whose journals one reads, and those one trusts to read one's own journal, has been criticized for being at odds with everyday use of the term. The individual users on a user's friends list may contain a mixture of people met through real world friendships, online friendships and general interests, as well as courtesy friendships where a user has "friended" someone who friended them. A friends list may represent something entirely unrelated to social relationships, such as a reading list, a collection or a puzzle.

The difference between online and real-world friendships is sometimes a source of conflict, hurt feelings, and other misunderstandings. LiveJournal friendships are not necessarily mutual; any user can befriend or "defriend" any other user at any time.

In the Russian LiveJournal community, the word френд ("friend", an English borrowing) is often used to describe this relationship instead of the native Russian word "друг" ([ droog ]) that translates to "friend".

The Dreamwidth code fork of LiveJournal has split the 'friend' concept into its two component pieces of subscription and access.

=== Abuse Prevention Team decisions ===
As LiveJournal has grown, it has had to deal with issues involving the content it hosts. Like most web logging hosts, it has adopted a basic Terms of Service. The Terms of Service simultaneously expresses a desire for free speech by the users while outlining impermissible conduct such as spamming, copyright violation, and harassment. LiveJournal created an Abuse Prevention Team and processes to handle claims about violations of the Terms of Service, violations of copyright, violations of the law, and other issues. There is an ability for a user to report an entry as "spam", and it is a user's responsibility to separate spamming and bot activity from actual violations while reporting.

If the Abuse Prevention Team determines that a violation has occurred, the user will be either required to remove the infringing material (as in the case of copyright violations); the journal will be suspended until such time as the material can be removed (e.g., posting of home addresses or other various contact information of another); or, in cases of severe or multiple violations, the journal will be suspended (e.g., account hijacking, multiple instances of copyright violation, child pornography). The offending user is notified by email of any journal suspension or, if any offending material must be removed, the user is given a deadline for its removal. When a journal is suspended, it effectively removes from sight everything the user has written on LiveJournal, including comments in other people's journals; however, the user is able to download the material while suspended. Those suspended users who have paid for LiveJournal's service do not have payments refunded.

A small controversy arose in November 2004 when a policy document used by the Abuse Prevention Team was leaked to a group of its critics before it was due to be released. The policy document has since been officially released.

Another controversy arose when users complained after an unknown number of users were asked to remove default user pictures containing images of breast feeding that were considered inappropriate as they contained a view of nipples or areolae. The incident attracted the attention of breast feeding advocacy groups such as Pro-Mom who publicized the issue to gain larger media awareness. LiveJournal responded by changing the FAQ on appropriate content for default user pictures. The current FAQ 111 says that nudity is not appropriate in default user pictures; the original FAQ 111 said that graphic sexual content was not appropriate. Breastfeeding pictures were not restricted by the original FAQ, and the current FAQ reflects the fact that they are only restricted from use as a default user picture. Breastfeeding pictures are still allowed as user pictures that may be manually chosen while posting but may not be the default.

=== Account vulnerabilities ===
In January 2006 the site had to make emergency changes to the way the site hosts user accounts due to a web browser-side security vulnerability. The hacker group responsible was later identified as "Bantown". Approximately 900,000 accounts were at risk.

=== LiveJournal and advertisements ===
In April 2006, LiveJournal announced it was introducing a new user type that gave free users some of the features available to paid members in exchange for ad sponsorship. This user type was initially called Sponsored+, but was later renamed to Plus.

This announcement was met with a whirlwind of controversy. Between April 2004 and January 2005, one of LiveJournal's Social Contract promises stated the site would, "Stay advertisement free." The Social Contract went on to say, "It may be because it's one of our biggest pet peeves, or it may be because they don't garner a lot of money, but nonetheless, we promise to never offer advertising space in our service or on our pages."

Another ad-related controversy occurred in June 2006, when ads for Kpremium began installing malware and triggering pop-up ads on Australian and Western European users' computers, against the LiveJournal ad guidelines. LiveJournal responded by removing the advertisement from the website and issuing an apology to its users.

In March 2008, LiveJournal discontinued the ability for new users to select the "basic" level of journal, which allowed for a minimal set of features with no advertising at no cost. However, in August of the same year, the company reversed the decision, reviving "basic" service as a manual, post-registration downgrade. However, the resumed basic service level is no longer ad-free: advertisements are displayed when readers who are not logged into livejournal view postings on a basic account.

Advertisement in LiveJournal is based on the user's preferable categories, gender, age, location, interests, or a small portion of public page contents. Ads are targeted according to information about the author, the viewer, and LiveJournal's ad preferences as a whole. Users can choose the preferences in their settings among five or more categories of advertising, including Art & Humanities, Cars & Wheels, Books & Reading, Charities, Home & Hobbies, Housing, Internet & Media etc. It is not possible to completely remove the advertisement other than by upgrading to a Paid Account.

As part of changes made in April 2017, Livejournal eliminated the ability of paid contributors to prevent ads being shown to their readers. Instead, LiveJournal began showing ads on all pages, including postings by paid contributors, unless the reader of the page was also a logged-in paid contributor.

=== Account suspension ===
In May 2007, LiveJournal suspended approximately 500 accounts and communities, causing what CNET referred to as a "revolt" from "thousands of LiveJournal customers", after a number of activist groups, including one named Warriors for Innocence, reported pedophilic material on its website.

According to Six Apart chairman and chief executive Barak Berkowitz, "We did a review of our policies related to how we review those sites, those journals, and came up with the fact that we actually did have a number of journals up that we didn't think met our policies and didn't think they were appropriate to have up". In a subsequent posting to the LiveJournal news community, he apologized, discussed some of the circumstances behind the suspensions, and indicated that the suspended journals would be reviewed and potentially brought back online. In particular, he noted that Livejournal's normal practice of reviewing suspensions and notifying suspended account holders had not been followed:

[T]hese journals were suspended for easily correctable problems [...] [T]his was not communicated to the journal or community owners at all. [T]hese journals were taken down before review could be completed to avoid mistakes.

Most of the backlash was from fan fiction writers whose communities and personal journals were among those suspended, seemingly because they listed interests such as "incest" or "non-con" (short for non-consensual). Although these communities did not necessarily encourage illegal behavior, it has been reported that there was no further investigation into the content of these journals.

Beyond merely fan communities, many were initially upset that communities entirely unrelated to anything but the discussion, sometimes therapeutic and other times literary, of rape or child molestation were among those suspended.

On May 31, 2007, Berkowitz released a statement to the LiveJournal news community announcing that Six Apart was currently in the process of unsuspending about half of suspended journals. The journals being reinstated fell into fandom or fiction categories or were journals that were suspended for problems related only to the contents of their profiles. In an earlier interview with news.com, he had stated that he would be "shocked" if "more than a dozen" journals would be reinstated.

On July 19, 2007, Abe Hassan at LiveJournal released a statement clarifying LiveJournal's suspension policies. A further statement was made on August 7, 2007.

=== Advisory board election ===
As previously announced, SUP Media, the latest owners of LiveJournal, decided to create an advisory board to help it make decisions. The first members were distinguished people in the areas of law and technology, danah boyd, Esther Dyson, Lawrence Lessig, and the original LiveJournal founder, Brad Fitzpatrick. SUP announced two other members would be appointed from the LiveJournal userbase, one Russian and one English speaking. The English speaking election was marred with accusations of ballot stuffing, conflicts of interest, and multiple death threats. The developer who wrote the poll software running the election called the ballot stuffing plausible.

=== Distributed denial-of-service attacks ===
LiveJournal was the victim of several DDoS attacks in 2011. The first attack on March 30 took down the site for several hours. The attack is reported to be the largest DDoS attack against LiveJournal since the site's creation. A second attack continued through April 4 and 5, causing service disruption for some users. A third attack in July caused the site to be unavailable for several hours at a time for a week. On December 2, 2011, another attack was recorded, with LiveJournal's status blog acknowledging it as such. Of the attacks, Russian president Dmitry Medvedev commented in April 2011 that "what has occurred should be examined by LiveJournal's administration and law enforcement agencies."

On Russia's election day in December 2011, LiveJournal saw another attack.

=== Presumed database breach ===
In October 2018, Troy Hunt, creator of the Have I Been Pwned? site, tweeted that he was getting multiple independent reports that email addresses and passwords from the LiveJournal user database were being used in a scam email campaign.

In May 2020, admins at Dreamwidth reported that they had repeatedly warned LiveJournal of an apparent breach with exposure of LiveJournal passwords, dating back to 2017 or 2014, but that LiveJournal had declined to disclose this to their users.

This information was also passed on to (or somehow otherwise received by) the MyIDCare website, a site that was created in 2015 for Federal employees or retirees, who were given free lifetime monitoring to this service by the Office of Personnel Management (the "opm" in the URL), an agency of the Federal Government, after the personal information of millions of people was compromised in a major data breach involving approximately 21,500,000 records in that year (which was made even more serious by the fact that some of the compromised data included information such as fingerprints, which helped this breach gain national attention. The MyIDCare site sent out an alert (dated May 22, 2020) to their previously registered users about a potential data breach at LiveJournal and requested that users change their passwords to protect those accounts against potentially fraudulent activity.

== Legal cases and censorship ==
=== Lawsuits against bloggers ===
In 2007, Russian blogger Savva Terentyev was accused of fomenting social hatred to the staff of the Ministry of Internal Affairs and sentenced to one year probation due to his comment in the blog of a local journalist. Later another number of individuals were accused of calling for extremist activity, libel and incitement of interethnic hatred.

=== LiveJournal blocking ===
In May 2007, the Chinese government began blocking LiveJournal. According to SixApart, there were 8,692 self-reported Chinese bloggers on the site.

In October 2010, LiveJournal was blocked in Kazakhstan by court order due to blogs containing extremist content. In March 2012, Uzbekistan began blocking LiveJournal. Although the home page and many of the advertised articles remained accessible, blogs contributed by certain well-known authors couldn't be accessed from Uzbekistan.

=== Russian jurisdiction ===
On April 4, 2017, LiveJournal significantly modified its terms of use, making the service subject to Russian law. The new terms prohibit users from posting "advertising and/or political solicitation materials" or performing any actions "contradictory to the laws of the Russian Federation". The terms also state that users are subject to Article 10.2 of the Federal Act of the Russian Federation No. 149, which dictates that blogs with more than 3,000 daily visitors are classified as media outlets and may not be published anonymously, are responsible for the dissemination of unverified information, and are restricted from posting pornography, obscene language, or "extremist materials". Western media have described these laws as "draconian" and restricting free expression.

Additionally, only the Russian-language version of the terms of service are considered legally binding. The new terms prompted wide concern from users who believed that their content would now be targeted under Russian censorship policies, including the country's "gay propaganda" law. This prompted an "exodus" to alternate platforms of groups who either support LGBT rights or wished to continue discussing those topics.

== Other sites running the LiveJournal engine ==
The software running LiveJournal is primarily written in Perl. It was open source software under the GNU General Public License until 2014, when LiveJournal closed their official source code repository to the public; the license continues to apply to the old code from before this change. Because it was open source software, many other communities have been designed using the LiveJournal software or code forks of it, with features and formats similar to LiveJournal itself, including Dreamwidth, InsaneJournal, DeadJournal and GreatestJournal (defunct). However, they often have different terms of service than LiveJournal's, making them attractive to users who have become disenchanted with LiveJournal's rules and wish to move their journals to other hosts.

== See also ==
- List of social networking services
- Timeline of LiveJournal
- Tumblr
