= SUP Media =

Russian media company

- Type: Privately held
- Industry: Internet
- Genre: Online Media Company
- Founded: 2006
- Founder: Alexander Mamut, Andrew Paulson
- Defunct: 2013
- Fate: Merged into Rambler
- Headquarters: Moscow, Russia
- Key people: Andrew Paulson, Chairman; Annelies van den Belt, CEO; Benjamin Wegg-Prosser, Director of Corporate Development; Edward Shenderovich, Director of Strategic Development
- Number of employees: 300
- Website: sup.com

SUP (Russian: СУП, which means 'soup') was an international online media company, founded in Moscow in mid-2006 by Andrew Paulson and Alexander Mamut. Its ownership was split between Mamut, Kommersant Publishing House and management.

== Company ==
SUP's first major announcement was a licensing agreement with Six Apart that gave SUP rights to use the LiveJournal brand, as well as operate portions of the LiveJournal service for LiveJournal's Russian users. SUP subsequently purchased LiveJournal outright from its previous owners, Six Apart. Since its launch SUP had grown through acquisition and organically. In June 2008 Kommersant, a leading Russian media company, acquired a significant minority stake in the business.

SUP was split into two business divisions, one was SUP Media, which includes Gazeta.ru (a popular online news site); Championat.com (an online sports site); and LiveJournal.com (a widely used blogging platform). The other business line was SUP Advertising, which includes +SOL (an online sales house which sells SUP's inventory, Russian media sites and foreign media sites including Yahoo, the BBC, Last.fm and a number of newspaper sites) and Victory SA, a digital marketing agency.

In 2013, SUP was merged with Rambler.
